= Abu Zaki =

- أبو زاكي
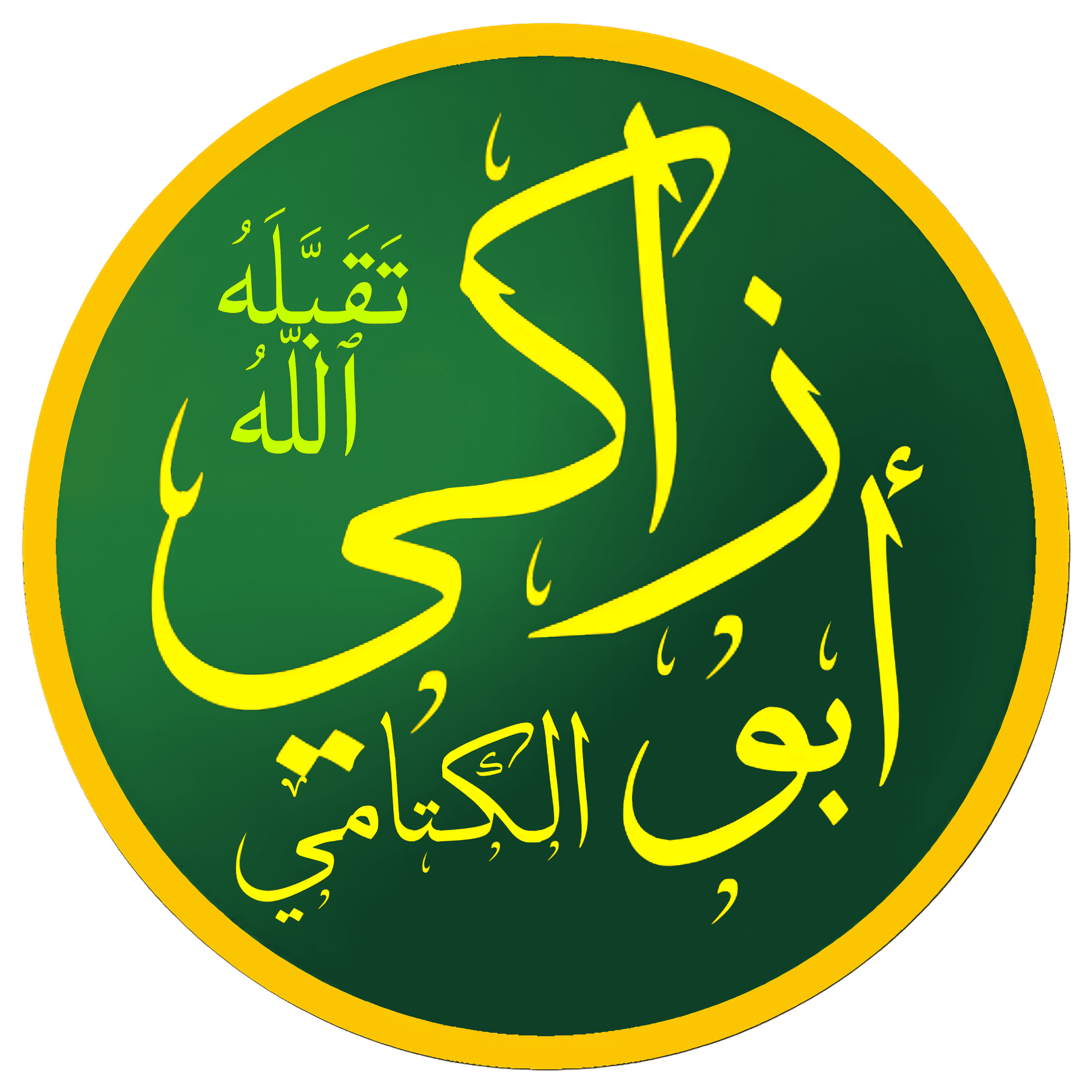

Ruler of Ifriqiya and Kairouan
- In office 909

Fatimid Da'i
- In office 893–911

Commander of the Fatimid army
- In office 893–911

Personal details
- Died: 18 February 911 Tripoli, Fatimid Caliphate
- Parent: Mu'arik Al-Kutami (father)
- Relatives: Maknun ibn Dubara (Uncle)

Military service
- Allegiance: Fatimid Caliphate
- Branch/service: Fatimid army
- Rank: General
- Battles/wars: Fatimid conquest of Ifriqiya; Siege of Tazrut; Siege of Mila; Capture of Tobna; Fall of Kairouan; Revolt in Fatimid Tripoli; Massacre of Tripoli

Abu Zaki (Arabic: أبو زاكي) also known as Tammam ibn Mu'arik Abu Zaki Al-Ikjani Al-Kutami, was a Fatimid ruler, Da'i, and military commander from the Kutama tribe. He is considered one of the political and religious founders of the nascent Fatimid Caliphate in 893 CE, and among the founding leaders of the Fatimid army. Abu Zaki was the first to receive and join Abu Abd Allah, believing in the da'wa in Ikjan, and was his official successor. He assumed the rule of Ifriqiya in 909 before the arrival of al-Mahdi. He led the Fatimid army in several campaigns during the Fatimid conquest of Ifriqiya and was the one who suppressed the Tripoli revolt.

== Origins and branches ==
Abu Zaki descends from the Berber tribe of Kutama. He is referred to as al-Ikjani or al-Ijjani in his full name, in reference to the clan of Ijjana. This clan is one of the largest branches of the Kutama who, along with the Banu Djimla, controlled the entire region located southeast of Ikjan. The Ijjana were among the clans that the Fatimid Kutama found difficult to subjugate for a long period, alongside the clans of Malusa, Lahisa, Lataya, and Djimla. Ijjana participated in the Siege of the capital Tazrut as part of the allied army, which included governors of the Aghlabid provinces loyal to the Abbasids, under the command of the Masalta leader, Fath ibn Yahya, against the Fatimids. However, the siege failed, and the Fatimid Kutama emerged victorious under the leadership of Ghazwiyya ibn Yusuf and Abu Abd Allah.

The Ijjana eventually joined the Fatimid State in the year 900 CE, after Hijrah (migrating) to Tazrut in a large assembly alongside their prominent chieftains: Farah ibn Jiran, Yusuf ibn Mahmud, and Wazra ibn Nasr.

== Fatimid Isma'ili Dawah ==
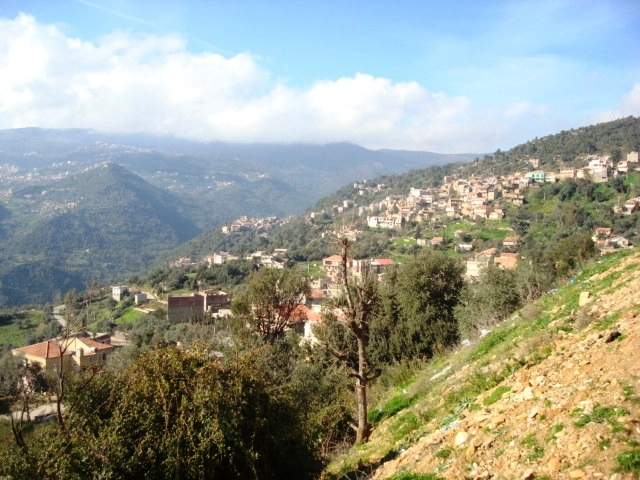
The heights of Ikjan, the site of the ancient Fatimid capital.

After Abu Abd Allah settled in Ikjan in 893 and began spreading the Da'wa, the first Shiite group gathered around him, This group comprised the most prominent early adherents the initial circle of Awliya who would assist him in his mission and serve as his most devoted supporters. Among them were Harun ibn Yunus, known as Shaykh al-Mashayikh from the Masalta of Kutama; al-Hasan ibn Harun from Banu Ghushman; Maknun ibn Dubara; and his nephew Abu Zaki Tammam ibn Mu'arik, and he referred to them as Awliya (Friends of God) and Al-Ikhwan (the Brothers) and the Al-Mu’minun (Believers).

Abu Zaki was the first youth encountered by the Shi'i Abu Abd Allah, who asked him: "What is your name, young man?" He replied: "Tammam." The Shi'i remarked: "With you, our affairs shall be completed (Tatammu)." He then asked: "What is your father's name?" He replied: "Mu'arik." The Shi'i said: "However, only after a great struggle (Arak)." Abu Abd Allah observed in Abu Zaki a keen sense of initiative, intelligence, and vigor in attending to his affairs, as well as an alacrity, desire, and dedication to the Fatimid isma'ilism cause. Consequently, Abu Zaki became the closest of all his confidants.

== Fatimid conquest of Ifriqiya (902–909) ==
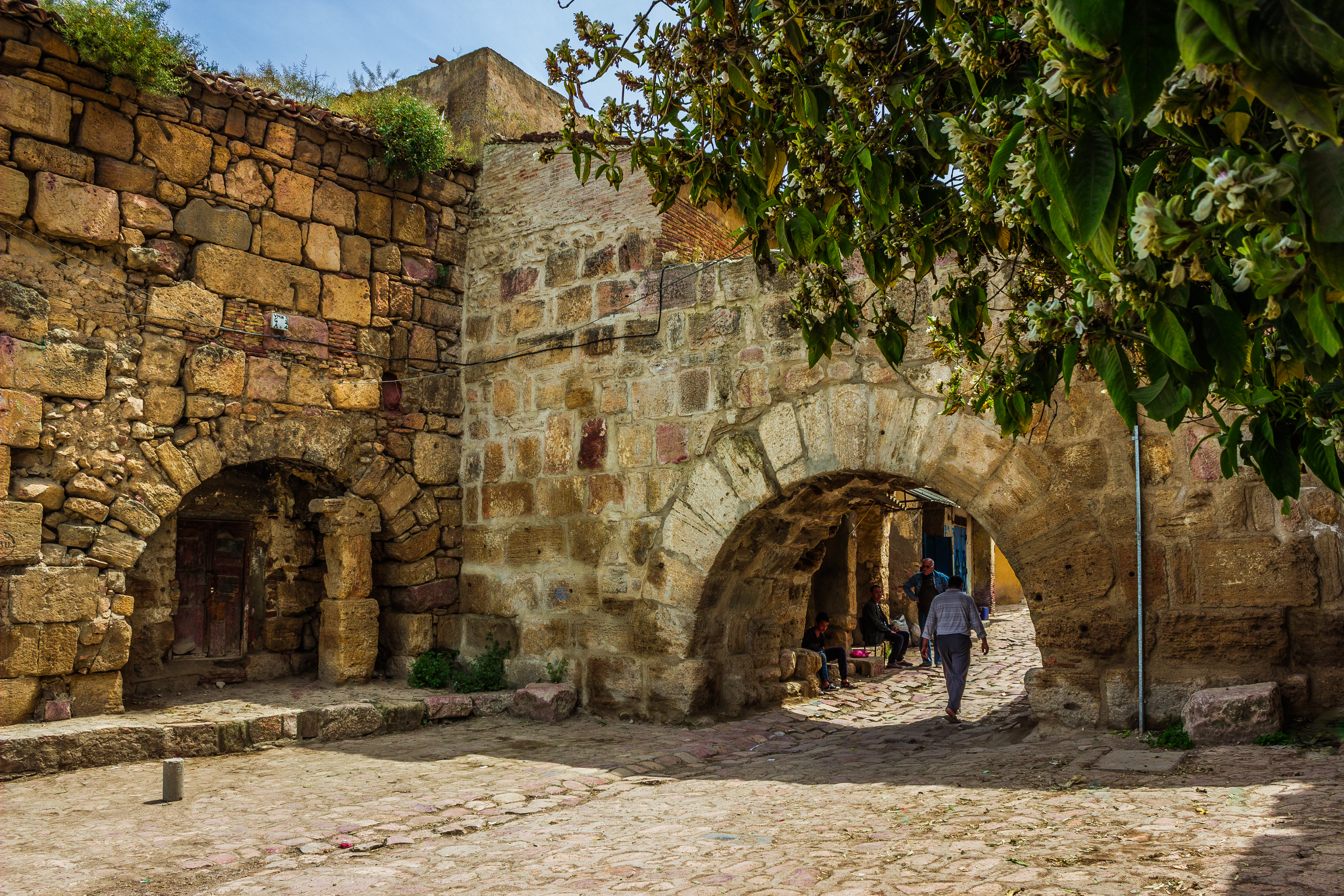
Bab el Bled, one of the gates of the old city of Mila.

In 902, Abu Zaki, accompanied by Abu Abd Allah, marched toward Mila. The Fatimid army surrounded it from every side, and Musa ibn al-Abbas went out to meet them with those who were with him and those from Kutama who had sought refuge with him, fighting them fiercely. When they realized they could no longer withstand the assault, and after a large group of Mila's leaders had been killed following the death of their companions, Musa ibn al-Abbas called upon Al-Hasan ibn Abi Khinzir, and the Fatimids granted them safe passage (Aman). They opened the city gates, and the Awliya entered and seized control. Abu Ibrahim ibn Musa ibn al-Abbas and a group of them slipped away under the cover of night, fleeing until they reached Ifriqiya. Upon entering, the Kutama killed Farah ibn Jiran, Yusuf, and two others. It is said that the one who sought their death was Abu Zaki. Control of Mila was established, and Maknun ibn Dubara, the uncle of Abu Zaki, was appointed as its governor.

In 906, the Fatimids besieged Tobna, surrounding the city from every side. It became clear that the defenders would not emerge to negotiate with the Fatimids; instead, they fortified themselves behind the walls and commenced fighting. The Awliya advanced from all directions and brought forth a siege tower (dabbaba), with which they brought down one of the wall's towers. Consequently, all the soldiers and frontline fighters fled, allowing Abu Zaki and the Awliya to overrun Tobna. Out of concern for the inhabitants most of whom were merchants the Fatimids did not inflict any harm upon them, and they were spared the looting that typically follows a siege. A garrison remained besieged within one of the walls but failed in its defense and was unable to operate the mangonel. Their commander, Abu Shaib, consulted with Abu Zaki, who subsequently granted them Aman (safe conduct).

After the Da'is (missionaries) consolidated their authority in Raqqada, they began preparing to march on Sijilmasa to bring the Mahdi and install him on the throne they had seized from the Aghlabids. Abu Abd Allah left, and Abu Zaki took his place as the ruler of Ifriqiya. His brother, Abu al-Abbas, joined him, working with Abu Zaki to establish Rawabit (garrisons) throughout the various regions, as less than three months had passed since their entry into Raqqada.

== Power Struggle ==
The narrations surrounding the "Awaited Mahdi" painted an idealized and supernatural image; they heralded the emergence of a handsome youth preceded by celestial omens and miraculous signs, achieving swift victories for his armies through divine intervention. However, the reality that shocked everyone upon the appearance of Ubayd Allah al-Mahdi was entirely different. Instead of the "legendary hero," they encountered a thirty-five-year-old ruler with a commercial background, inclined toward luxury and opulence, enjoying fine garments and a life of prosperity.

This luxury created a deep rift and a clash with the ascetic principles instilled by the Fatimid missionaries and Awliya in the souls of the Kutama tribes. It reached a point where Abu Abd Allah al-Shi'i publicly criticized al-Mahdi, accusing him of undermining the fighting spirit of the Kutama men by drowning them in gifts, money, and positions. Since Abu Abd Allah had not met him face-to-face before the Sijilmasa meeting, he was ignorant of his character and intentions.

Once the Caliph al-Mahdi had settled in Raqqada, he seized the reins of the state and sidelined the Da’i, his brother Abu al-Abbas, and several Sheikhs of the Kutama. Abu Zaki, who had governed the empire, and Abu al-Abbas, who had exercised authority during Abu Abd Allah's long military campaign against Sijilmasa, were resentful of this action. They formed an opposition party and conspired to overthrow al-Mahdi before the end of his first year in power. Abu al-Abbas secured the support of his brother, Abu Abd Allah, and they were joined by Harun ibn Yunus known as the Sheikh al-Shuyukh al-Rubabi the official spokesperson for the Caliph. The Caliph had Harun assassinated, which only increased the number of dissidents, Abu Zaki turned his home into the party's headquarters and a planning hub, where Abu Abd Allah and the conspirators stayed for three consecutive nights.

The Da’is and commanders refused to serve under the Caliph's banner, declaring: 'We shall issue the orders and make the decisions, just as before! We refuse to receive from his hands like slaves; rather, what we have seized with our own swords must belong to us and remain in our hands, as it was in the past.' The Da’i and the Kutama chieftains repeatedly voiced their sense of marginalization, remembering with bitterness how al-Mahdi had seized the funds amassed in Ikjan. Furthermore, the employment of officials from the old regime fueled an atmosphere of intense hostility. The Caliph exploited the conspirators' hesitation to launch an open conflict, due to their failure to agree on a future ruler, and began eliminating the architects of the plot. He sent Abu Zaki on a mission to Tripoli, where his uncle, Maknun ibn Dubara, was governor. Upon his arrival, The Caliph wrote to the governor regarding his killing. His uncle killed him 'Sabran' (in captivity) on Monday, 15 Jumada al-Thaniya, 298 AH (18 February 911 AD).

== See also ==
- Kutama
- Fatimid army
- Isma'ilism
- Ikjan
- Fatimid Caliphate
- Dawah
- Wali
- Shia Islam
