= Abbasiya =

Abbasiya or Abbasiyya (Arabic: العباسيّة, romanized: al-ʿAbbāsiyya, lit. 'the Abbasid') may refer to:

- Aabbassiyeh, a village in Lebanon
- Abbassia, district of Cairo
  - Abbasiya Palace, located in the district
- Al-'Abbasiyya, a village in Israel
- Al-Abbasiyya, capital of the Aghlabid dynasty
- Abbasiya, a nickname for block 3 and 4 in Jleeb Al-Shuyoukh
