= Tazrut =

Holy Fatimid city

- ⵜⴰⵣⵔⵓⵜ (Berber languages)
- Location of Tazrut in Algeria, corresponding to the modern-day Aïn Mellouk district of Tadjenanet Tazrut (Africa)
- Interactive map of Tazrut
- 36°17′26″N 6°6′20″E
- Type: Holy city
- Cultures: Numidian; Latin; Berber; Fatimid; Ismailism
- Location: Aïn Mellouk in Mila Province, Algeria
- Part of: Numidia; Roman Empire; Fatimid Empire

History
- Built: Ancient foundation Late Antiquity; Medieval foundation 893 (Fatimid era)
- Built by: Kutama
- Event(s): Sieges of Tazrut, including fall of the city in 902

Tazrut (Berber: ⵜⴰⵣⵔⵓⵜ, Arabic: تازروت) is a medieval mountain city in Algeria. In 893, it served as the capital of the nascent Fatimid Empire and its Dar al-hijra. It is located in the commune of Aïn Mellouk in Mila province.

It was chosen by the missionary Abū ʿAbd Allāh al-Shīʿī as a second base for spreading the Isma'ili Dawah among the Kutama tribes, both politically and religiously. During this formative stage, Tazrut held a sacred status among Isma'ili Fatimids, as it was the first Dār al-Hijra established by Abū ʿAbd Allāh and his supporters from the Kutama tribe, symbolizing the religious and ideological center of the movement. It retained this role until the Fatimids transferred their capital to Ikjan in October 902, which subsequently became the new base of the movement.

== Toponymy ==
Historians have long debated the precise transcription of the word Tazrut. Ibn al-Athir referred to it as Nasron, while Al-Nuwayri recorded it as Tāzrat, and Al-Maqrizi named it Tasrot. However, Al-Qadi al-Nu'man identified it as Tazrut, which is considered the correct spelling. This is corroborated by a Numidian era inscription found on one of the region's rocks, where it is written as Tazrut. The name itself is of Amazigh origin, meaning "the greate rock." The term locally means 'the rocky hill.' It is also nicknamed 'The City,' a place that, according to local inhabitants, can be accessed through a cave entrance.

== Geography ==
Archaeologist Ammar Nouara confirms that cave of Tazrut site is situated at an altitude of 1,002 meters, approximately 7 km northwest of the main town of Aïn Mellouk, in the southern part of the Mila Province. This significant historical site which is officially listed in the registry of protected cultural property in the region contains the remains of the Fatimid Fortress of Tazrut, located near Mechtat Ain Bezzat.

Tazrut is situated in the heart of a mountain range between the upper Rhumel river and Valley of Redjas, approximately ten miles from the city of Constantine. The site occupies a strategic position overlooking its entire surroundings. To the north, the view extends to the Mouia and Zouaoua mountains at the level of Ferdjioua, reaching as far as the peaks of the Babor Mountains. To the south, it overlooks the vast plains of Abdelnour, Teleghma, and Zemmour, with the Aurès Mountains visible in the far distance. Administratively, the area where Tazrut was built currently belongs to the municipality of Aïn Mellouk, within the district of Tadjenanet, Mila Province.

== See also ==
- Kutama
- Fatimid Caliphate
- Dar al-hijra
- Ikjan
