= Ali ibn Umar al-Balawi =

10th-century Fatimid governor of Sicily

Ali ibn Umar al-Balawi (Arabic: علي بن عمر البلوي) was a short-lived Fatimid governor of Sicily in 912–913.

The first Fatimid governor of the island, al-Hasan ibn Ahmad ibn Abi Khinzir, had made himself unpopular with the Sicilian jund, who overthrew him and requested the Fatimid caliph al-Mahdi Billah to send them a new governor. This was granted, and a tax official, known only by his title of sahib al-khums, ruled over the Sicily until the arrival of Ali ibn Umar al-Balawi in August 912. Al-Balawi is described as a "gentle elderly gentleman", and was not to the liking of the troops. In early 913, the sahib al-khums was murdered, Ibn Abi Khinzar's brother evicted from Agrigento, and al-Balawi deposed. From 913–916 Sicily was in revolt against the Fatimids, under the rule of Ahmad ibn Qurhub.

== Sources ==
- Halm, Heinz (1991). Das Reich des Mahdi: Der Aufstieg der Fatimiden [The Empire of the Mahdi: The Rise of the Fatimids] (in German). Munich: C. H. Beck. ISBN 978-3-406-35497-7.
- Metcalfe, Alex (2009). The Muslims of Medieval Italy. Edinburgh: Edinburgh University Press. ISBN 978-0-7486-2008-1.

Preceded by al-Hasan ibn Ahmad ibn Abi Khinzir	Fatimid governor of Sicily; 912–913	Succeeded by Ahmad ibn Ziyadat Allah ibn Qurhub as autonomous emir under Abbasid suzerainty
