= Ahmad ibn Ziyadat Allah ibn Qurhub =

Emir of Sicily from 0913 to 0916

Ahmad ibn Ziyadat Allah ibn Qurhub, commonly known simply as Ibn Qurhub, ruled Sicily in rebellion against the Fatimid Caliphate, from 913 to 916. He launched raids against the Byzantine Empire in southern Italy and against the shores of Fatimid Ifriqiya, but was deposed and handed over to the Fatimids, who executed him and his followers in July 916.

== Origin and early career ==
Ahmad hailed from Sicily, whose gradual conquest from the Byzantine Empire had been started by the Aghlabids of Ifriqiya in the 820s. The process had ended with the conquest of Taormina in 902, but had left some Byzantine strongholds in the mountainous northeast of the island (the Val Demone) as well as across the Strait of Messina in Calabria.

Ahmad ibn Qurhub's patronymics indicate a relationship with Uthman ibn Qurhub, who had been governor of the island in the 830s, and with a Muhammad ibn Qurhub, a military commander who had begun the siege that led to the capture of Syracuse in 878. This Muhammad may have been Ahmad's father.

Ahmad had served as Aghlabid governor of Tripoli just before the overthrow of the Aghlabids and the establishment of the Fatimid Caliphate in 909.

== Rebellion ==
Soon after its establishment, the Fatimid regime in Ifriqiya sent its own governors to the island. However, the local Sicilian army, which was used to a broad autonomy in running its affairs, deposed the first governor, al-Hasan ibn Ahmad ibn Abi Khinzir, and drove away his successor, Ali ibn Umar al-Balawi. Rejecting the Fatimids' Shi'a regime, on 18 May 913 they raised Ibn Qurhub to power as governor of the island. Ibn Qurhub quickly rejected Fatimid suzerainty, and declared for the Fatimids' Sunni rival, the Abbasid caliph al-Muqtadir at Baghdad. The latter recognized Ibn Qurhub as emir of Sicily, and in token of this sent him a black banner, robes of honour, and a gold collar. As the historian Alex Metcalfe writes, the movement headed by Ibn Qurhub was peculiar to Sicily's circumstances. As a frontier society centred on jihad, "some form of caliphal authority [...] was essential for Sicily's legitimate existence as a political entity", but at the same time, it was a "specifically Sicilian attempt to free itself from colonial rule from Ifriqiya".

Already in spring/summer 913 he launched the customary annual raids against the Byzantine territories: his son Ali besieged Taormina, which had been reoccupied and rebuilt by the Byzantines, for two months without success, but Ibn Qurhub himself led a raid into Calabria, returning with considerable booty and many prisoners. A treaty between the Sicilian Arabs and the Byzantine strategos of Calabria, Eustathios, whereby the Byzantines agreed to give 22,000 gold coins annually in exchange for a truce, may have taken place soon after this. According to Heinz Halm, this truce may have led to dissatisfaction among the Sicilian troops with Ibn Qurhub and contributed to his eventual downfall, since it put an end to the profitable plundering raids against Byzantine territories.

In July 914, the Sicilian fleet, commanded by Ibn Qurhub's younger son Muhammad, raided the coasts of Ifriqiya. At Leptis Minor, the Sicilians caught a Fatimid naval squadron by surprise on 18 July: the Fatimid fleet was torched, and 600 prisoners were made. Among the latter was the former governor of Sicily, Ibn Abi Khinzir, who was executed. The Sicilians defeated a Fatimid army detachment sent to repel them, and proceeded south, sacking Sfax and reaching Tripoli in August 914. Only the presence of the Fatimid heir-designate, al-Qa'im bi-Amr Allah, who was then on his way to invade Egypt, deterred an attack on the city.

In the next year, however, a similar undertaking failed, and the Sicilian fleet was defeated by the Fatimids, possibly with Byzantine assistance. As a result, the Sicilians began to turn to the Fatimids, with the Berbers of Agrigento being the first to defect, and other cities following soon after. His support vanishing, Ibn Qurhub prepared to flee to al-Andalus, but on 14 July 916 he was captured by the Sicilians, who delivered him and his supporters to the Fatimid caliph al-Mahdi Billah in chains. Al-Mahdi brought them to his palace city at Raqqada, where they were lashed on the tomb of Ibn Abi Khinzir, mutilated, and publicly crucified.

Sicily was subdued by a Fatimid army under Abu Sa'id Musa ibn Ahmad al-Dayf, which besieged Palermo until March 917. The local troops were disarmed, and a Kutama garrison loyal to the Fatimids was installed, under the governor Salim ibn Asad ibn Abi Rashid. Nevertheless, the legacy of Ibn Qurhub on Sicily was remembered for some time: as late as 973, when Ibn Hawqal visited Palermo, he found one of the gates of the city walls named after him.

== Sources ==
- Halm, Heinz (1991). Das Reich des Mahdi: Der Aufstieg der Fatimiden [The Empire of the Mahdi: The Rise of the Fatimids] (in German). Munich: C. H. Beck. ISBN 978-3-406-35497-7.
- Lilie, Ralph-Johannes; Ludwig, Claudia; Pratsch, Thomas; Zielke, Beate (2013). Prosopographie der mittelbyzantinischen Zeit Online. Berlin-Brandenburgische Akademie der Wissenschaften. Nach Vorarbeiten F. Winkelmanns erstellt (in German). Berlin and Boston: De Gruyter.
- Metcalfe, Alex (2009). The Muslims of Medieval Italy. Edinburgh: Edinburgh University Press. ISBN 978-0-7486-2008-1.

Preceded by Ali ibn Umar al-Balawi as governor for the Fatimid Caliphate	Emir of Sicily; 18 May 913 – 14 July 916	Succeeded by Abu Sa'id Musa ibn Ahmad al-Daif as governor for the Fatimid Caliphate
