= Al-Hasan ibn Ahmad ibn Abi Khinzir =

Early 10th-century Fatimid military commander

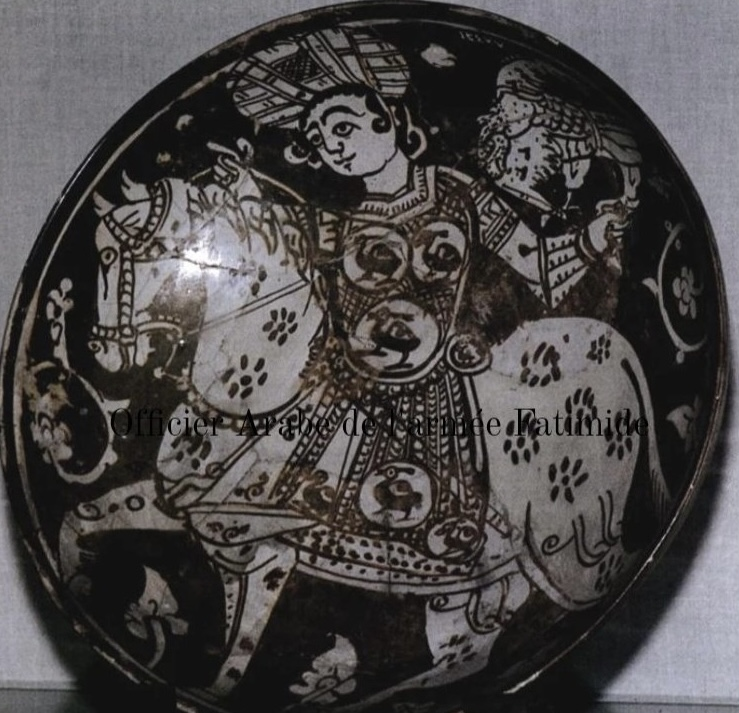

Governor of Sicily and Kairouan
- In office 909–914

Fatimid Da'i
- In office 902–914

Commander of the Fatimid army
- In office 902–914

Commander of the Fatimid navy
- In office 909–914

Personal details
- Born: 9th century Mila
- Died: July 914 Leptis Minor, Fatimid Caliphate
- Parent: Ahmad ibn Abi Khinzir (father)
- Relatives: Ali (brother) Habib (brother)

Military service
- Allegiance: Fatimid Caliphate
- Branch/service: Fatimid army Fatimid navy
- Rank: General; Admiral
- Battles/wars: Fatimid conquest of Ifriqiya; Capture of Mila; Fall of Kairouan; Fatimid–Byzantine wars; Fatimid invasion of Demona; Raids of Calabria; Revolution in Fatimid Sicily

Al-Hasan ibn Ahmad ibn Abi Khinzir (Arabic: الحسن بن أحمد بن أبي خنزير; fl. 902–914) was a Fatimid military commander who served as the first Fatimid governor of Kairouan and of Sicily.

== Life ==
Al-Hasan ibn Ahmad ibn Abi Khinzir was an Arab from the city of Mila. He joined the Isma'ili da'wa led by Abu Abdallah al-Shi'i, and when Abu Abdallah overthrew the Aghlabid dynasty of Ifriqiya in March 909 and established the Fatimid Caliphate, Ibn Abi Khinzir was chosen as governor (amil) of the capital of Ifriqiya, Kairouan. Hasan's brother Khalaf became governor of the former Aghlabid administrative centre of al-Qasr al-Qadim at the same time. Their appointment was confirmed by the new Fatimid caliph, al-Mahdi Billah, when he assumed the reins of power in early 910. As governor, Ibn Abi Khinzir helped to impose Shi'a rituals in Kairouan, which earned him the deep enmity of the Sunni Maliki jurists.

Soon after, al-Mahdi appointed Ibn Abi Khinzir as his first governor in Sicily, which the Aghlabids had largely conquered from the Byzantine Empire. He was accompanied by his brother Ali and the new chief qadi for the island, Ishaq ibn Abi Minhal, as well as a new official, the "Lord of the Fifth" (sahib al-khums), who was sent to collect one fifth of all income according to Shi'a juridical traditions—something which the Sunni and fiercely independent-minded Arab–Berber Sicilian warrior caste vehemently opposed. The new governor arrived at Mazara on 20 August 910, and made for the island's capital, Palermo, while leaving his brother at Agrigento, which was held by a strong Berber garrison. In the summer of 911, Ibn Abi Khinzir led the customary annual raiding campaign against the remaining Byzantine strongholds in the northeast (the Val Demone). He made some prisoners and laid waste to the fields, but captured no forts. Soon he had made himself so unpopular with the Sicilians, apparently due to heavy taxation, that they rose in revolt, imprisoned him, and asked for his replacement. This was granted, and the sahib al-khums ruled over the Sicily until the arrival of the new governor, the elderly Ali ibn Umar al-Balawi, in August 912. This did not calm the situation, however: in early 913, the sahib al-khums was murdered, Ibn Abi Khinzar's brother evicted from Agrigento, and al-Balawi deposed. From 913 to 916 Sicily was in revolt against the Fatimids, under the rule of Ahmad ibn Qurhub.

On his return, he resumed his position in Kairouan. Tensions between the Kutama and the inhabitants of Kairouan remained unresolved, as the Kutama considered it their inalienable right, won in holy war, to plunder the city. On 10 April 912, an anti-Kutama pogrom broke out in the city, starting from a clash in the marketplace between the overbearing Kutama and the local merchants. The populace mobilized, and killed every Kutama they could find inside the city walls; over 700 are said to have been killed. Powerless to stop this, Ibn Abi Khinzir managed to calm matters, and quickly removed the corpses by throwing them in the canalization. As no-one could be found to be responsible for this act, Caliph al-Mahdi had to content himself with a formal apology by the city notables and a monetary fine. This event only increased Kutama dissatisfaction with the Fatimid regime they had helped establish, and led to the unsuccessful rebellion under the anti-mahdi Kadu ibn Mu'arik al-Mawati.

In July 914, the Sicilian fleet, commanded by Ibn Qurhub's younger son Muhammad, raided the coasts of Ifriqiya. At Leptis Minor, the Sicilians caught a Fatimid naval squadron by surprise on 18 July: the Fatimid fleet was torched, and 600 prisoners were made. Among the latter was Ibn Abi Khinzir, who was executed. In July 916, when Ibn Qurhub and his followers were deposed and handed over to al-Mahdi, they were lashed on Ibn Abi Khinzir's tomb, mutilated, and publicly crucified.

== Sources ==
- Halm, Heinz (1991). Das Reich des Mahdi: Der Aufstieg der Fatimiden [The Empire of the Mahdi: The Rise of the Fatimids] (in German). Munich: C. H. Beck. ISBN 978-3-406-35497-7.
- Lilie, Ralph-Johannes; Ludwig, Claudia; Pratsch, Thomas; Zielke, Beate (2013). Prosopographie der mittelbyzantinischen Zeit Online. Berlin-Brandenburgische Akademie der Wissenschaften. Nach Vorarbeiten F. Winkelmanns erstellt (in German). Berlin and Boston: De Gruyter.
- Metcalfe, Alex (2009). The Muslims of Medieval Italy. Edinburgh: Edinburgh University Press. ISBN 978-0-7486-2008-1.

Preceded by Ali ibn Muhammad ibn Abi'l-Fawaris as governor for the Aghlabid dynasty	Fatimid governor of Sicily; 910–911/912	Succeeded by Ali ibn Umar al-Balawi
