= Aïn Mellouk =

- Commune and town
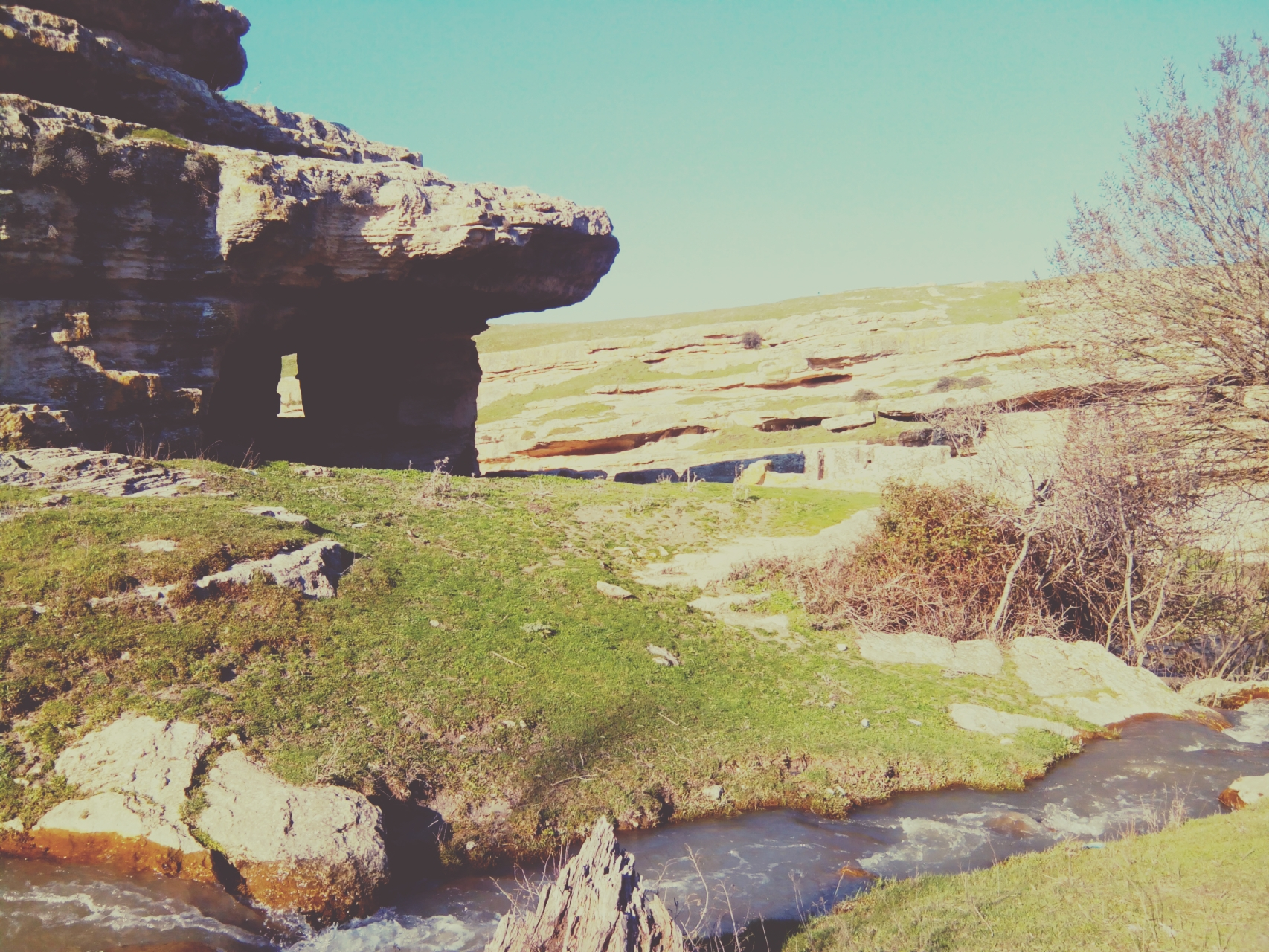

- Location of Aïn Mellouk within Mila Province

- Location of Aïn Mellouk within Algeria
- Country: Algeria
- Province: Mila Province

Population (1998)
  - Total: 12,716
- Time zone: UTC+1 (CET)

Aïn Mellouk is a town and commune in Mila Province, Algeria. At the 1998 census it had a population of 12,716.
