= Latin culture =

Latin culture may refer to:

- Culture of the Latins, an ancient Italic people
  - Culture of ancient Rome, descended from the culture of the Latins
- Latin, the language of the Latins, and the lingua franca of ancient Rome and early medieval Western Europe
  - Latin literature, literature written in Latin
    - Classics, the study of Latin and Ancient Greek literature
- Romance-speaking world, areas of the world where Romance languages (which descended from Latin) are spoken
  - Latin America, areas of the Americas where Spanish, Portuguese and French are spoken

== See also ==
- Italic peoples
- Romance languages
