= Battle of Tabrashq =

Fatimid punitive campaign

Coordinates: 35°36′38″N 8°42′54″E

- Part of the Fatimid conquest of Ifriqiya
Date	Summer of 908
Location	Marmajna, near Thala, Tunisia
Result	Fatimid victory

Belligerents
Fatimid Empire	Aghlabid Emirate

Commanders and leaders
Ghazwiyya ibn Yusuf; Abu Makdul	Unknown

Strength
2,000 cavalry	Unknown

Casualties and losses
Unknown	Very Heavy
- Location within Tunisia Battle of Tabrashq (Mediterranean)

The Battle of Tabrashq was a Fatimid punitive campaign led by Ghazwiyya ibn Yusuf against defectors who shifted their allegiance to the Aghlabids after the pledge of loyalty. The battle took place between the Fatimid army and the tribes of Banu Washnu and Banu Harrash, ending in a heavy defeat for the tribes.

== Background ==
Upon news of the Fatimid advance reaching Kasserine, Commander Ibrahim ibn Abi al-Aghlab moved his army from Al-Aribus toward Dar Madyan. In response, the Fatimids dispatched a military vanguard of two 2,000 cavalry to scout the Aghlabid strength, leading to the outbreak of a combat confrontation.

When the Fatimid Da'is (Awliya) moved their main army to support them, they found their camp scattered among rugged terrain and trees. Consequently, they decided to withdraw to Kasserine and then retreat to Ikjan, putting an end to their military operations at that time. The Aghlabid side exploited this event politically; Ibn Abi al-Aghlab exaggerated the scale of the victory in his letter to Ziyadat Allah. The latter, in turn, proceeded to circulate the news through official records and pulpits across various regions, seeking to calm the opposing public opinion and contain the widespread criticism surrounding his policies.

== Battle ==
When Ibrahim Ibn Abi al-Aghlab returned to al-Aribus, where he won over the Banu Washnu and Banu Sadghiyan of the Banu Harrash tribe, who had previously declared their loyalty to the Fatimid Empire. In response, a military campaign was dispatched under the leadership of Ghazwiyya ibn Yusuf and Abu Makdul, which succeeded in reaching Qasr al-Ifriqi finding it deserted and then Tabrashq.

Setting a tight ambush and avoiding lighting fires to maintain the element of surprise, the forces launched a sudden morning attack on the Banu Washnu, inflicting very heavy losses before withdrawing toward Guelma. This coincided with a parallel military move by ibn Abi al-Aghlab’s army, led by Ibn al-Hamadani, aimed at punishing the Banu Wardim for joining the Fatimid Empire. Consequently, Abu Abd Allah sent a force of 500 cavalry to aid the Banu Wardim, enabling them to repel the attack and secure their region.

== See also ==
- Kutama
- Fall of Kairouan
- Battle of Fahs al-Riyah
- Ismailism
