= Ghazwiyya ibn Yusuf =

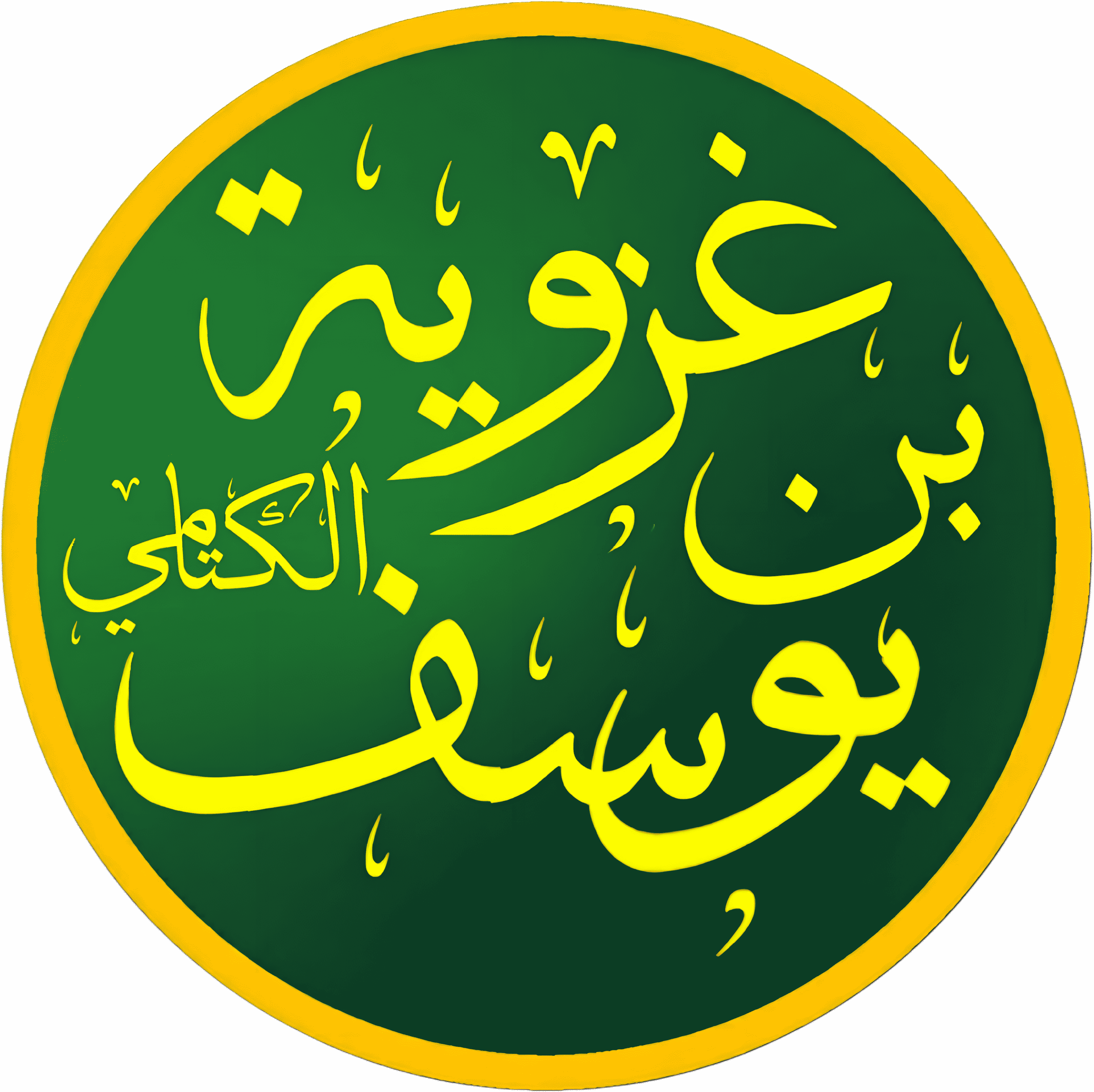

Fatimid Da'i
- In office 893–909

Commander of the Fatimid army
- In office 893–915

Head of Security
- In office 909–915

Governor of Kutama and Baghai and Béja
- In office 911–915

Personal details
- Died: 915 Aurès, Fatimid Caliphate
- Children: Muhammad ibn Ghazwiyya
- Parent: Yusuf al-Kutami (father)
- Relatives: Hubasa ibn yusuf (brother)

Military service
- Allegiance: Fatimid Caliphate
- Branch/service: Fatimid army
- Rank: General
- Battles/wars: Fatimid conquest of Ifriqiya; Battle of Fahs al-Riyah; Battle of Tabrashq; Siege of Qastiliya; Capture of Gafsa; Siege of Baghai; Battle of al-Aribus; Fall of Kairouan; Capture of Sousse; Fatimid Conquest of the Rustamids; Capture of Tahert

Ghazwiyya ibn Yusuf or Aruba bin Yusuf, also known as Ghazwiyya ibn Yusuf al-Malusi al-Kutami, was a Berber military commander, governor, and a Fatimid Da‘i from the Kutama tribe. He was among the founding leaders of the Fatimid army, and was instrumental in the establishment of the early Fatimid Empire in Ikjan and Tazrut. He governed the province of Beja, Baghai and Kutama, led multiple campaigns during the Fatimid conquests of Ifriqiya, Tahert, and Tripoli, contributed to the consolidation and establishment of the caliphate. Ghazwiyya served as chief of security for Caliph Ubayd Allah, being among his most trusted associates.

== Origins ==
Ghazwiyya bin Yusuf, also known as Ghazwiyya bin Yusuf al-Malusi, is considered one of the founding leaders of the Fatimid State. He was surnamed "al-Malusi" in reference to the clan of "Malusa," which is one of the largest branches of the Kutama Berber tribe that inhabited the fortified highlands of eastern Algeria.

According to the genealogical authentication of the scholar Ibn Khaldun, the Malusa descend from the Banu Titasen bin Gharsan, sharing common ancestry with the clans of Iyan, Lataya, Ijjana, Ghasman, and Aurbast; among them are the "Banu Zidwi" who inhabited the mountains overlooking Constantine.

The geographical sphere of influence for the Malusa and its sub-tribes extends from Mount Zouaghi in Constantine, passing through the cities of Mila and Setif, and reaching as far as Jijel. Historically, they were concentrated in the peaks of the Tell Atlas in Sidi Mimoun and Babor. These regions formed the military strike force and the strategic launching point for Ghazwiya's movements toward Ikjan and Tazrut, leading to their conquests in Ifriqiya.

== Ismaili Dawah (893–909) ==
Location of Mila Province in Algeria, where Tazrut is located.

Ghazwiya bin Yusuf is considered one of the earliest believers in the Isma'ili Dawah and among its most prominent spreaders. Following its inception in the land of Kutama, the Fatimid missionaries and leaders faced fierce opposition from alliances of other Kutama branches, including Ajana, Lataya, and the inhabitants of Mila and Setif. These groups allied with the Aghlabid governors loyal to the Abbasids against the Fatimids, forming a massive army led by the commander of Masalta, Fath bin Yahya. As they besieged the Fatimid capital, Tazrut, Ghazwiya along with the Da'is and Mashayikh hid Abu Abd Allah in a secure location under heavy guard. During the first day of the siege, no Fatimid soldiers were harmed, while one of the enemy's horsemen was killed. In the battle that ensued the following day, the casualties were far more severe for the opponents; many were killed, while the Awliya remained safe.

On the third day, the fighting intensified, and Ghazwiyya's bravery became evident. He fought valiantly among the infantry and sustained a wound so severe it caused him to lose his voice. Ultimately, the Fatimids achieved a complete victory. The Allies forces scattered; some retreated to Mila, while the tribes returned to their respective territories. On the fourth day, Ghazwiyya and Abu Abd Allah launched an attack on the troops of Setif and the neighboring Kutama clans, defeating them. The following day, they struck the soldiers of Mazata, inflicting a crushing defeat and seizing all their wealth. These Fatimid conquests led to a massive influx of the Kutama people towards the state to pledge their allegiance and join its ranks.

== Fatimid conquest of Ifriqiya (902–909) ==
=== Battle of Fahs al-Riyah ===
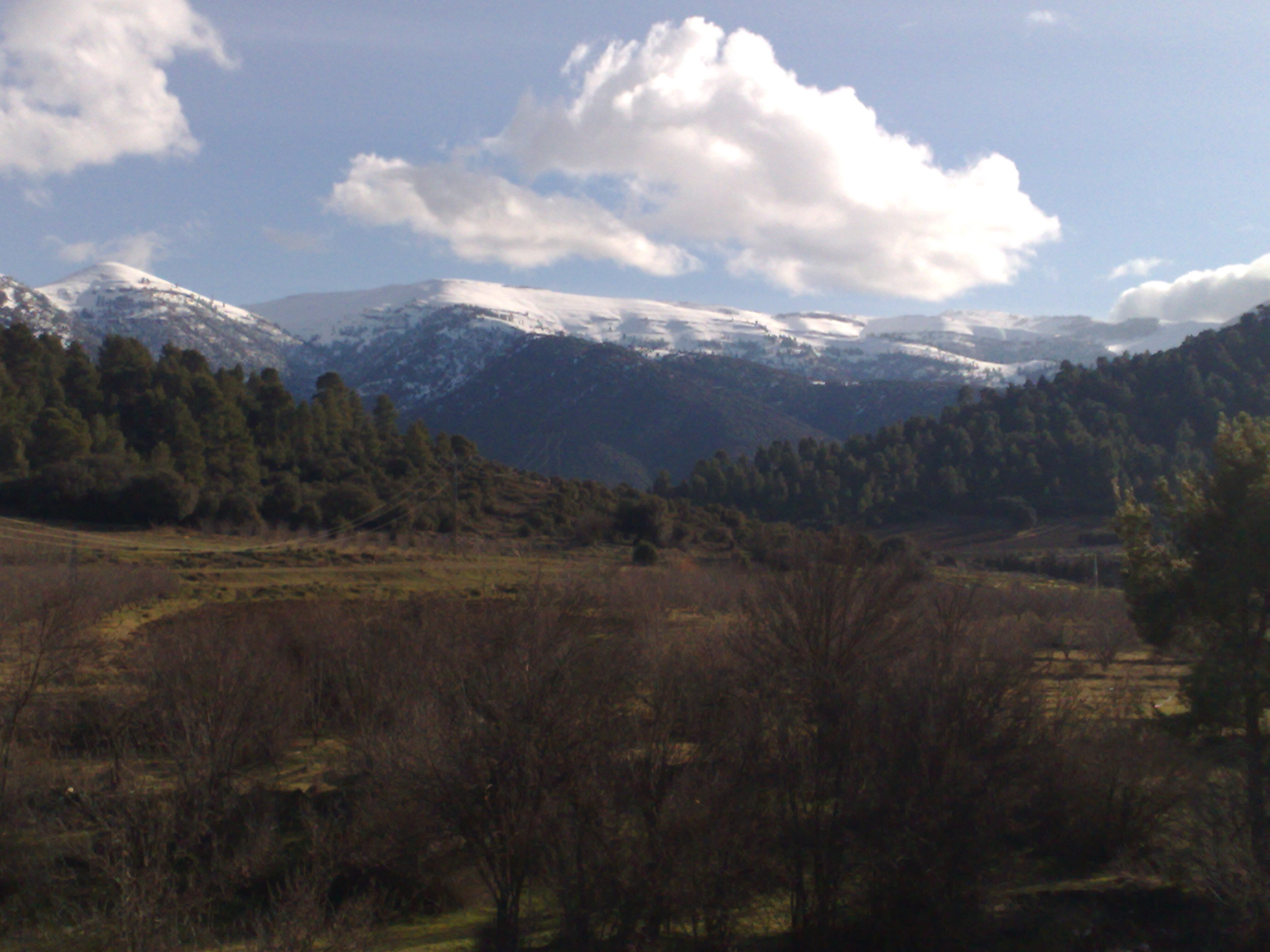
Djebel Chélia, the highest point of the Aurès Mountains, Algeria.

Following the fall of the capital, Tazrut, into the hands of the Aghlabids, the Fatimids relocated their capital to Ikjan in October 902. The conflict between the Abbasids and the Fatimids intensified; and in 906, the Aghlabid Emir, Ziyadat Allah, dispatched an army of 12,000 troops led by Harun al-Tobni to defend the city of Baghai. This force was subsequently reinforced by local levies. Ghazwiya set out with a force of 1,000 Kutama cavalry and intercepted them at Fahs al-Riyah in the Aures Mountains. A battle ensued, resulting in a crushing victory for Ghazwiyya, who annihilated the majority of the Aghlabid army and slew their commander, Harun al-Tobni.

=== Siege of Kasserine ===
During the Fatimid conquests eastward advance toward Raqqada, they invaded Kasserine, where a battle broke out. Failing to seize control, the Fatimids withdrew to Ikjan. Consequently, Aghlabids returned to Al-Urbus, where he was joined by the tribes of Banu Washnu and Banu Sadghiyan (of the Banu Harash), who had previously pledged allegiance to the Fatimids. Upon receiving this news, a Fatimid army led by Ghazwiya bin Yusuf and Abu Makdul set out. They advanced stealthily with their troops until they reached Qasr al-Ifriqi, which they found deserted. They proceeded to Tabarashq and spent the night there. The Banu Washnu were nearby, so the Fatimid army lay in ambush without lighting any fires. At dawn, they launched a surprise attack, inflicting heavy casualties, before withdrawing to Guelma.

=== Capture of Qastiliya and Gafsa ===
Location of Gafsa in Tunisia.

The Fatimids altered their invasion strategy, opting to advance from the south to avoid direct confrontation with the Aghlabids following previous setbacks and the illness of Abu Abd Allah. In 908, the Fatimid army departed from Ikjan toward Qastiliya. Despite facing resistance, they succeeded in seizing control, and the Fatimid army looted the city. They then proceeded directly toward Gafsa, whose inhabitants surrendered to the Fatimids, who subsequently collected the tax harvests (Jibaya). Afterward, they marched to Baghai, where Ghazwiyya bin Yusuf was appointed over it, accompanied by Abu Makdul and 500 cavalry of Malusa . The remainder of the army then returned to Ikjan with Abu Abd Allah.

=== Siege of Baghai ===
Exploiting the small Fatimid garrison at Baghai, the Aghlabid army marched from Al-Urbus to reclaim the city. Abu Makdul requested reinforcements, prompting the Kutama specifically Banu Saktan to mobilize 12,000 cavalry. And through the tactical expertise of Ghazwiyya bin Yusuf and Abu Makdul, and with the support of local cavalry, the city successfully withstood the Aghlabid assault from first day to the last day.

=== Capture of Kairouan ===
Upon the news of Ziyadat's flight from Kairouan reaching the Fatimids, a military force consisting of 1,000 cavalrymen was dispatched under the command of Ghazwiyya ibn Yusuf. Accompanying him was one of the preeminent missionaries, al-Hasan ibn Abi Khinzir, the chieftain of Mila. In an effort to pacify the people of Ifriqiya and grant them safe conduct, the Fatimid Shi'ite army entered Kairouan peacefully, and the Fatimids officially took control of Raqqada. Ghazwiyya and Al-Hasan a deliberately kept the Kutama soldiers outside and prohibited them from looting the site, ensuring that no terror was spread among the city's inhabitants.

== See also ==
- Kutama
- Fatimid Caliphate
- Fatimid army
- Fatimid Conquest of Ifriqia
- Ikjan
- Tazrut
- Ismailism
