= Muhammad ibn Ghazwiyya =

- محمد بن غزوية
- Office: Fatimid Da'i (?–908); Commander of the Fatimid army (?–908); Governor of Baghai; 908
- Father: Ghazwiyya ibn Yusuf
- Relatives: Hubasa ibn yusuf (Uncle)

Military service
- Allegiance: Fatimid Caliphate
- Branch/service: Fatimid army
- Rank: General
- Battles/wars: Fatimid conquest of Ifriqiya; Siege of Baghai †

Muhammad ibn Ghazwiyya (Arabic: محمد بن غزوية) was a Fatimid Da'i, military commander, and governor from the Kutama tribe. He served as one of the leaders during the Fatimid conquest of Ifriqiya during the era of the nascent Fatimid Empire. Alongside his father, Ghazwiyya ibn Yusuf, and served as the governor of Baghai.

== Biography ==
Muhammad bin Ghazwiyya descends from the Berber tribe of Kutama and is the son of the commander Ghazwiyya bin Yusuf. He was mentioned by Al-Qadi al-Nu'man in Iftitah al-Da'wa (The Commencement of the Mission) during the Fatimid conquest of Ifriqiya. After the Fatimids succeeded in conquering Gafsa and Qastiliya in 908 and seizing the wealth of Ziyadat Allah from them, the Fatimid army led by Ghazwiyya, Abu Abd Allah, and Abu Makdul marched toward Baghai. Al-Qadi al-Nu'man mentioned that Muhammad ibn Ghazwiyya passed away therein; consequently, he was succeeded in its governorship by his father, Ghazwiyya, who was accompanied by 50 horsemen from the Malusa tribe. Along with him was Abu Makdul leading 500 horsemen. Meanwhile, Abu Abd Allah proceeded with the troops until he reached Ikjan.
