= Fall of Kairouan =

- Part of the Fatimid conquest of Ifriqiya
Date	Tuesday 21 March 909
Location	Kairouan, in present-day Tunisia 35°40′38″N 10°06′03″E
Result	Fatimid victory
Territorial changes	Kairouan conquered by the Fatimids; End of the Aghlabid dynasty

Belligerents
Fatimid Empire	Aghlabid Emirate

Commanders and leaders
Ghazwiyya ibn Yusuf; Al-Hasan ibn Ahmad	Emir Ziyadat Allah III (surrendered); Ibrahim ibn Abi al-Aghlab (AWOL); Mahbub ibn Abdun

Strength
1,000 Cavalry	Unknown

The Fall of Kairouan was the final campaign during the Fatimid conquest of Ifriqiya. Led by Ghazwiyya ibn Yusuf, the offensive forced the Aghlabid Emir, Ziyadat Allah III, to flee. The Fatimid army stormed the city, bringing it under their control and permanently ending Aghlabid rule, which paved the way for the establishment of the Caliphate.

== Background ==
Map showing the fall of the Aghlabid Emirate (902–909 CE) and the Fatimid expansion starting from the Kutama territories towards Kairouan.

The Fatimid conquest of Ifriqiya was launched between 902 and 909 CE, following the consolidation of Fatimid rule in the Central Maghreb (modern-day Algeria). After the Aghlabids, led by Ibrahim ibn Abi al-Aghlab, destroyed Tazrut, the Fatimids relocated their capital to Ikjan in 902 CE. From there, they initiated a series of military campaigns, capturing numerous cities. The expansion began with the fall of Mila, followed by the capture of Tobna in 907 CE. The campaign then proceeded to Baghai, extending toward Qastilia and Gafsa via the southern route. The final major stronghold to fall was al-Arbus, which served as the last station before the Fatimids reached the capital, Raqqada.

== Capture of al-Aribus ==
Following the comprehensive military collapse of the Aghlabid forces and the scattering of their retreat axes before the advance of the Fatimid army (Awliya), the defeated troops dispersed along divergent geographical paths.

The commander, Ibrahim ibn Abi al-Aghlab, along with the state elite, took the route of mountain al-Harraqin, while the allied tribes took the path of Hashar Mammses, situated 30 kilometers west of Kairouan. Meanwhile, the general masses headed toward the central city of Kairouan, and Mahbub ibn Abdun accompanied by the Hawwara and Nefza tribes followed the path of Bani Bashir. The Awliya pursued these routes with operations involving killing, capture, and looting, culminating in the city being plundered until sunset.

On the morning of Sunday, March 19, Fatimids crowned their victory by attacking the city of al-Aribus, where the Aghlabids had fortified themselves. The assault ended with the city being taken by force; a massive massacre, alongside the total looting of the city’s resources.

== Desertion of Ziyadat Allah III ==
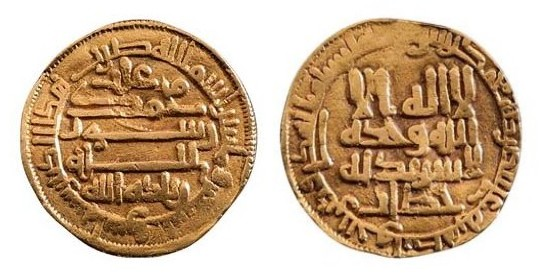
Gold dinar minted under Ziyadat Allah III (r. 903–909).

Following the Dhuhr prayer on Sunday, the city of Raqqada experienced severe political turmoil as news arrived of the final defeat of the Aghlabid army in al-Aribus. This prompted Emir Ziyadat Allah III to activate a pre-planned escape strategy. To mislead the public and prevent unrest in Kairouan, the Emir staged a "false victory" by executing prisoners and parading their heads, while secretly gathering the notables of his household and his inner circle to depart. Despite the political opposition voiced by his minister, Ibn al-Sa'igh who urged him to remain steadfast and offer generous payments to win over the soldiers, citing the precedent of his grandfather Ziyadat Allah I, the Emir met this advice with suspicion and panic, accusing his minister of secret collusion with the Fatimids.

The departure caravan set out on Monday, night amidst a tragic and emotional atmosphere. Ammunition and treasures were loaded, and he took with him those dear to him, including concubines, the mothers of his children, and his sons and daughters. 1,000 Saqlibd Slavic servants were used as "human safes," each wearing gold belts containing 1,000 Dinars to ensure financial liquidity, while the remaining funds were secured as cargo.

Chroniclers sympathized with the fate of this unfortunate Emir, who was forced to flee under the cover of darkness, and they raced to describe his painful adventure in moving terms. They spoke of a beautiful concubine singing sorrowful songs of love to the rhythm of the lute, her eyes weeping and her heart broken. They described the noble Emir, moved to the point of tears, unloading a weight of gold and placing a mount at the young singer's disposal. Finally, they noted the caravan's departure by torchlight as the Muezzin called for the Isha prayer.

Heading east, the deposed Emir stopped in Tripoli for several days before continuing toward Fustat. He spent only one week there, facing restrictions from Al-Nushari, the governor of Egypt, and Ibn Bastam, the tax official, which forced him to move to Ramla. Despite his attempts to regain legitimacy by appealing to the Abbasid Caliphate in Baghdad, the response arrived late and disappointing, urging him to return to the Maghreb without immediate military support. Consequently, the Emir surrendered to a life of debauchery and pleasure in "Dhat al-Hammam" in Alexandria as an escape from his political reality, until his journey ended with his death as a stranger in Jerusalem in 912 AD (299 AH).

== Capture of Kairouan ==
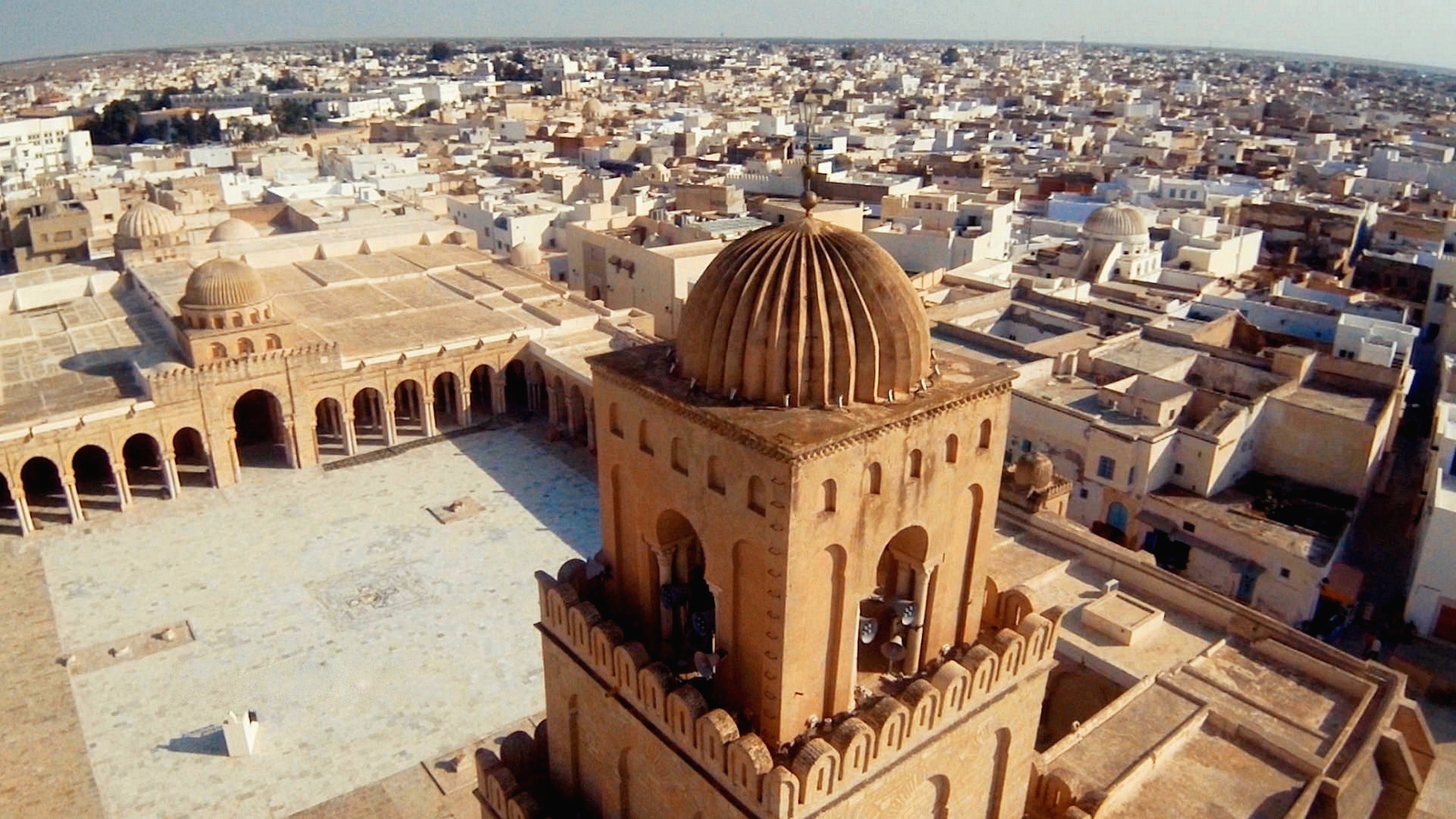
Aerial view of the Great Mosque and city of Kairouan.

Upon receiving news of Ziyadat Allah III’s flight, the Fatimid leadership dispatched a military expedition of 1,000 cavalry led by Ghazwiyya ibn Yusuf, accompanied by Al-Hasan ibn Abi Khinzir, to reassure the people of Ifriqiya and restore stability. The Fatimid forces entered the city of Kairouan peacefully, implementing strict disciplinary measures against chaotic elements to bolster the residents' sense of security. In the wake of this political shift, jurists and notables gathered to meet the new commander, driven by anxieties regarding his sectarian background and the nature of his Berber armies. However, the meeting succeeded in dispelling these fears; the Fatimid leaders displayed humility and political acumen, emphasizing the sanctity of life and the protection of property, which left a positive impression on the city’s intellectual and social elite.

== See also ==
- Isma'ilism
- Battle of Fahs al-Riyah
- Fatimid army
- Fatimid Caliphate
- Aghlabid dynasty
