= Battle of Fahs al-Riyah =

907 battle in the Aurès Mountains, Algeria

- Part of Fatimid conquest of Ifriqiya
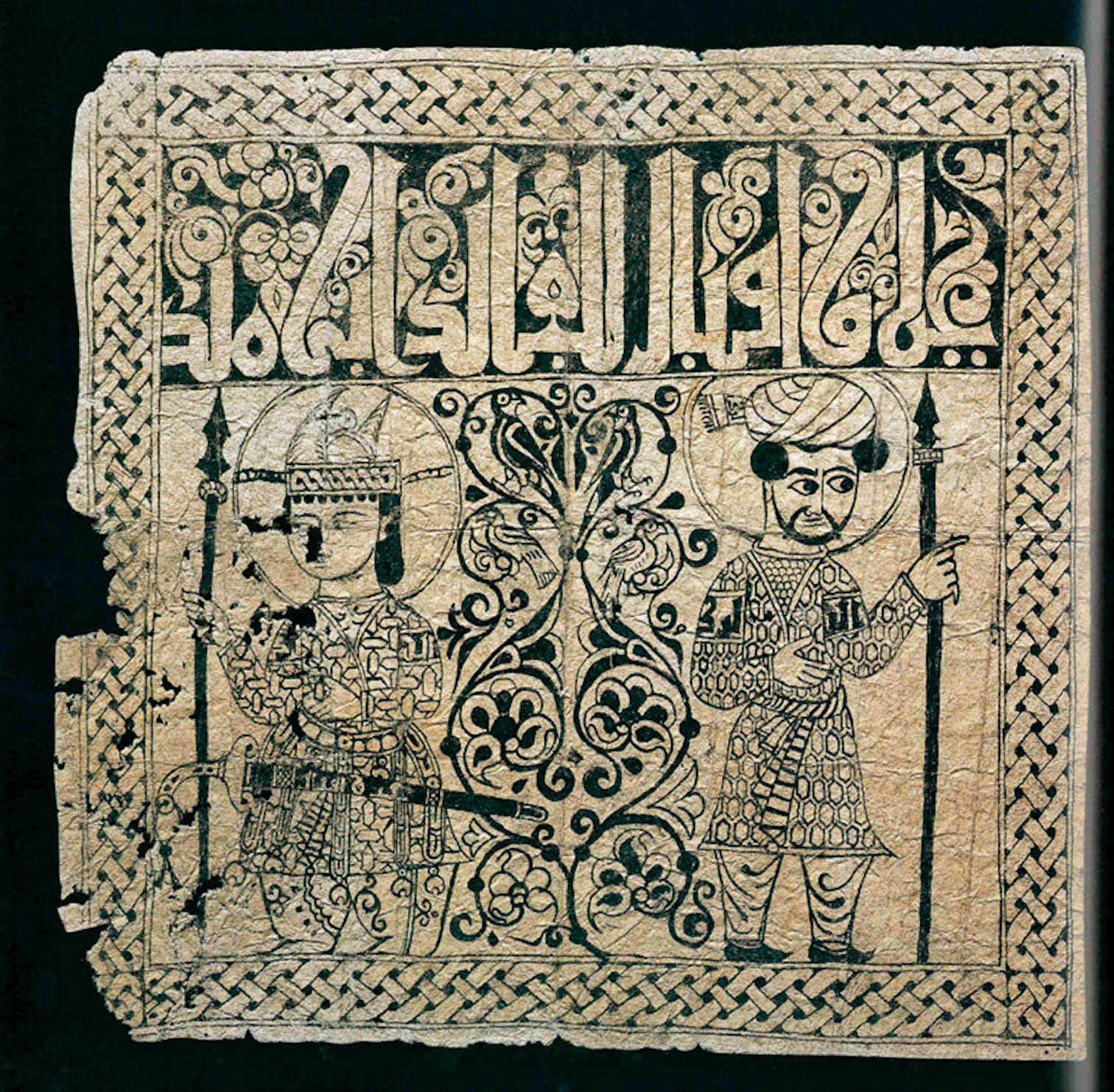
- Fatimid army depiction
Date	Spring 294 AH / 907 CE
Location	Northern Aurès Mountains, modern-day Algeria
Result	Fatimid victory

Belligerents
Fatimids	Aghlabids

Commanders and leaders
Ghazwiyya ibn Yusuf	Harun al-Tobni (executed)

Strength
1,000 Kutama cavalry	12,000 troops 5,000 allies

Casualties and losses
Light	15,000+ (majority of the Aghlabid army annihilated)

The Battle of Fahs al-Riyah or Fahs al-Rimah, was a confrontation between the Fatimid army, led by Ghazwiyya ibn Yusuf Al-kutami, and the Aghlabid forces under the command of Harun al-Tobni. The two armies encountered each other unexpectedly in the area of Fahs al-Riyah, located in the northern region of the Aurès Mountains. The clash ended in a crushing defeat for the Aghlabids.

== Background ==
As part of the ongoing Fatimid conquest of Ifriqiya, Ziyadat Allah III undertook military measures to secure the strategic city of Baghai, located along the main route between the Constantine Mountains and the Aurès, leading inland through Tbessa and Medjana. He appointed Harun al-Tobni to command an Aghlabid army of 12,000 men, reinforced by 5,000 local troops sent by his brother Ziyadat Allah al-Tobni, the governor of Baghai. The army was fully equipped and supplied, tasked with encamping in the area to secure the city and repel the repeated Fatimid raids.

== The battle ==
While advancing with 1,000 Kutama cavalry, Ghazwiyya ibn Yusuf unexpectedly encountered the Aghlabid forces near Fahs al-Riyah. Despite being vastly outnumbered, the Fatimid troops launched a surprise attack that quickly disrupted the Aghlabid lines. The Kutama forces, renowned for their mobility and ferocity, overwhelmed the enemy, resulting in the near-total destruction of the Aghlabid army. Harun al-Tobni and most of the Aghlabid commanders were killed. The victory paved the way for further Fatimid advances in the region.

== Aftermath ==
The battle marked a turning point in the Fatimid campaign against the Aghlabids. The annihilation of a major Aghlabid force severely weakened their control over key eastern strongholds, allowing the Fatimids to consolidate their influence in eastern Algeria and push further into Ifriqiya. The fall of Baghai followed soon after, contributing to the eventual collapse of the Aghlabid dynasty. Upon receiving news of the defeat, Ziyadat Allah III decided to appoint Ibrahim ibn Abi al-Aghlab as the new commander of the Aghlabid forces, entrusting him with the task of containing the Fatimid advance.

== See also ==
- Fatimid caliphate
- Fatimid conquest of Ifriqiya
- Aghlabid dynasty
- Kutama Berbers
- Aurès Mountains
