= Hujariyya =

Hujariyya (Arabic: حجرية, romanized: Ḥujariyya, lit. 'Men of the Chambers') can refer to:

- Al-Hujariah, region in Yemen
- Hujariyya (Abbasid troops), an elite cavalry corps of the late Abbasid Caliphate
- Hujariyya (Fatimid Caliphate), a palace military academy, later expanded to an elite corps, of the Fatimid Caliphate
