= Hujariyya (Fatimid Caliphate) =

The Hujariyya (Arabic: حجرية, romanized: Ḥujariyya, lit. 'Men of the Chambers') were a special training corps in the Fatimid army, expanded to an elite cavalry corps of 3,000–5,000 men at the turn of the 12th century.

== History ==
The name derives from the word for 'chamber, room' (ḥujra), and refers to troops housed and trained in or near the caliphal palace and its chambers. Such an institution existed in the Abbasid Caliphate during the early 10th century.

The Fatimid caliph al-Mu'izz (r. 953–975) established a palace training school (ḥujra) at the caliphal palace in Cairo, aiming to train officers in the art of war. The eminent Fatimid general Anushtekin al-Dizbari was taught in this institution, but graduated early after only three years. The general and future vizier in 1149–1154, al-Adil ibn al-Sallar, was also a graduate.

The function of the school was transformed by the vizier al-Afdal Shahanshah in the late 11th century, who found that his troops were inferior to the Crusaders. From a selective institution open only to a few, al-Afdal expanded the Hujariyya to a fully-fledged military corps by recruiting 3,000 youngsters from the sons of the military and civil elites, with the purpose of creating horsemen capable of matching the Turkish ghilmān (slave-soldier cavalry) in skill. The corps was divided into seven barracks (ḥujarāt) during the training, with names like al-Manṣūra ('the Victorious') or al-Fatḥ ('Conquest'). The cadets were under the supervision of tutors (ustādhs) for a period of several years, during which they were taught various subjects and skills. After graduation, the soldiers were known as the 'youths of the household' (ṣibyān al-khāṣṣ). Sometime after al-Afdal's tenure, the corps rose further to 5,000 men.

== Sources ==
- Beshir, B. (1978). "Fatimid Military Organization". Der Islam. 55 (1): 37–56. doi:10.1515/islm.1978.55.1.37. ISSN 0021-1818.
- Brett, Michael (2017). The Fatimid Empire. The Edinburgh History of the Islamic Empires. Edinburgh: Edinburgh University Press. ISBN 978-0-7486-4076-8.
- Kennedy, Hugh (2001). The Armies of the Caliphs: Military and Society in the Early Islamic State. London and New York: Routledge. ISBN 0-415-25093-5.
- Lewis, B.; Ménage, V. L.; Pellat, Ch. & Schacht, J., eds. (1971). "Ḥud̲j̲ra". The Encyclopaedia of Islam, Second Edition. Volume III: H–Iram. Leiden: E. J. Brill. p. 545. OCLC 495469525.
