= Sedouikech =

The Sedouikich are a subdivision of the Berber confederation of the Kutama. They inhabit the plains of the Kutama territory located between Béjaïa and Constantine in Algeria. The term "Kutama" fell into disuse from the 12th century onwards, with only successor tribal groups—such as the Sedouikich—being mentioned. Thus, for the Almohad and post-Almohad periods, only Ibn Khaldun (in the 14th century) still traces the history of the Kutama bloc and its offshoots; other sources, by contrast, describe the group's various branches without referring to a unified Kutama entity.

== Factions ==
The Sedouikich have several branches: the Sîlîn, the Tarsoun, the Torghîan, the Moulît, the Casha, the Lemaï, the Gaïaza, the Beni Zâlan, the El Bouéira, the Beni Merouan, the Ouarmekcen, the Segdal and the Beni Ayad. Some of these names were still in use in the 19th century: Siline, Gacha (Guecha), Lemay, Mouia, Beni Merwan, Beni Ayad, etc., and others have disappeared.

In the same regions, other Berber factions are found: the Lemaïa and the Righa. In the 14th century, the Sedouikich and these factions formed a powerful group under the authority of a Sedouikich family: the Ouled Souac. Tribes of diverse origins were admitted to the confederation, though they held the status of vassals or mere subjects liable for taxation. This distinctive organization foreshadowed the hierarchical structures found among dynastic or "djouad" tribes (the nobility of the sword).

== Lifestyle and reputation ==
The Sedouikich travel the region on horseback. They don't want to be identified as Kutama due to that confederation's role in the 10th-century Fatimid saga—an association carrying a negative stigma because of its Shiite allegiance—and its subsequent hostility toward the regimes that succeeded the Fatimids. In Constantine, the term "Katmi" or "Ktim" carried a negative connotation until the 19th century; this explains why the Kutama either became Arabized or dispersed into confederations with no apparent connection to one another.

The Sedouikich is a branch of the Baranis-Kutama who live in tents and raise camels. The Kutama are generally considered Kabyles, the Sedouikich is therefore an example of a Kabyle shepherd and lives in a tent.

== History ==
=== Medieval period ===
The mid-12th century marked the disappearance of the term "Ketama" and the exclusive mention of affiliated tribal groups thereafter. Almohad and post-Almohad historiography thus omits the term "Ketama," with the notable exception of Ibn Khaldun (d. 808/1406), who devotes an entry to them titled "Account of the Kutama, descendants of the Baranis, who subjugated other tribes and overthrew the Aghlabid dynasty in the name of the Shiites." In this historical overview, he describes their territory as extending from Biskra in the south to the Mediterranean in the north, and from Bône in the east to Dellys in the west; he notes the decline of the Kutama population due to their exile to the East, as well as the arrival and intermingling of Hilalian tribes in the Constantine and Sétif regions. According to him, the "Banu Sedouikich" constituted the principal community originating from the Ketama; their territory lay between Constantine and Bougie, and they were led by the "Awlad Sawad" or "Swac"(also spelled "Souac").

The dynastic organization fostered clientelism within tribal groups in the medieval Maghreb: the ruling power would ally itself with a tribe's most powerful faction, even if it meant overturning the alliance when the time was right. The Hafsids employed this policy with the Sedouikich. The Swac were divided into two branches: the Ouled Alaoua (Ibn Souac) and the Ouled Yousef (Ibn Hammou Ibn Souac).

Following the enthronement of Abu Yahya Abu Bakr as Sultan of Constantine in 1310, the Ouled Allaoua—allied with the Prince of Béjaïa—were driven from their territory. The exiled families settled near M'sila among the Ayad, a confederation of Hilalian tribes, and adopted the Arabic language through this contact. Meanwhile, the Ouled Yousef were rewarded by the Hafsid authorities and placed in command of the Sedouikich; they subsequently split into four branches: the Ouled Mohamed Ben Yousef, Ben Mehdi Ben Yousef, Ben Ibrahim Ben Yousef, and the Ben Tazizt. During the Marinid invasion of 1346, the Ouled Allaoua were in turn elevated to prominence. Mehenna assumed command of the tribe; a large tribe in the Skikda's Sahel (foothills) still bears the name Mehenna. This new leader was soon assassinated by his rivals from the Ouled Yousef, prompting the Ouled Allaoua to return to Msila. Ibn Khaldun also notes a faction of the Sedouikich subject to the Beni Sakin—one of their leading families—whose territory bordered that of the Louata near Mount Babor and encompassed the entire province of Béjaïa. Their leader, a Hafsid partisan, had his hands and feet severed by the Marinids, yet the Beni Sakin regained power over Béjaïa upon the Hafsid restoration.

=== From the 16th to the 19th century ===
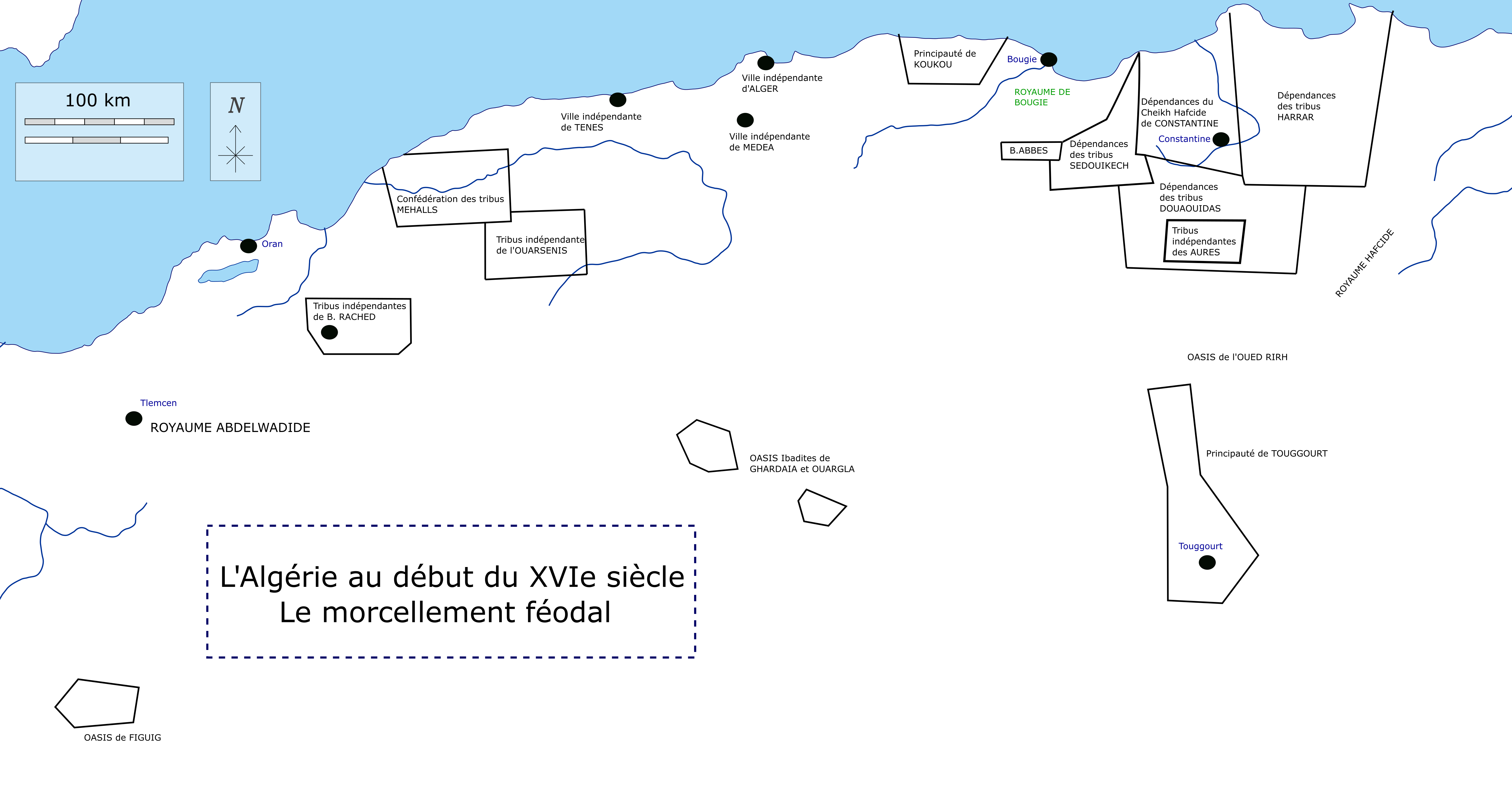
Algeria at the beginning of the 16th century and its fragmentation, including the dependencies of the Sedouikech tribes

At the beginning of the 16th century the political situation in Algeria was fragmented, in particular we note that there were in Kabylia the principalities of the Belkadis in Koukou, and of the Beni-Abbas; in Constantinois, between Medjana and Constantine are the dependencies of the Sedouikech tribes, completely to the East, the dependencies of the Harrar tribes. The Aït Abbas tribe (in Arabic: Beni Abbas) at the origin of the formation of the Sultanate of Aït Abbas (1510–1872) is of Sedouikich origin from the Azizid faction.

== Sources ==
- Recueil des notices et mémoires de la Société archéologique du département de Constantine (in French). L. Arnolet. 1872. p. 185.
- Julien, Charles-André (1994). Histoire de l'Afrique du Nord: des origines à 1830 (in French). Payot. p. 355. ISBN 978-2-228-88789-2.
- Ibn-Ḫaldūn, ʿAbd-ar-Raḥmān Ibn-Muḥammad (1852). Histoire des Berbères et des dynasties musulmanes de l'Afrique septentrionale: collationné sur plusieurs manuscrits (in French). Impr. du Gouvernement. pp. 293–296.
- Djender, Mahieddine (1991). Introduction à l'histoire de l'Algérie (in French). Entreprise nationale du livre. p. 194.
