= Capture of Tahert (909) =

- Part of Fatimid conquest of the Rustamids
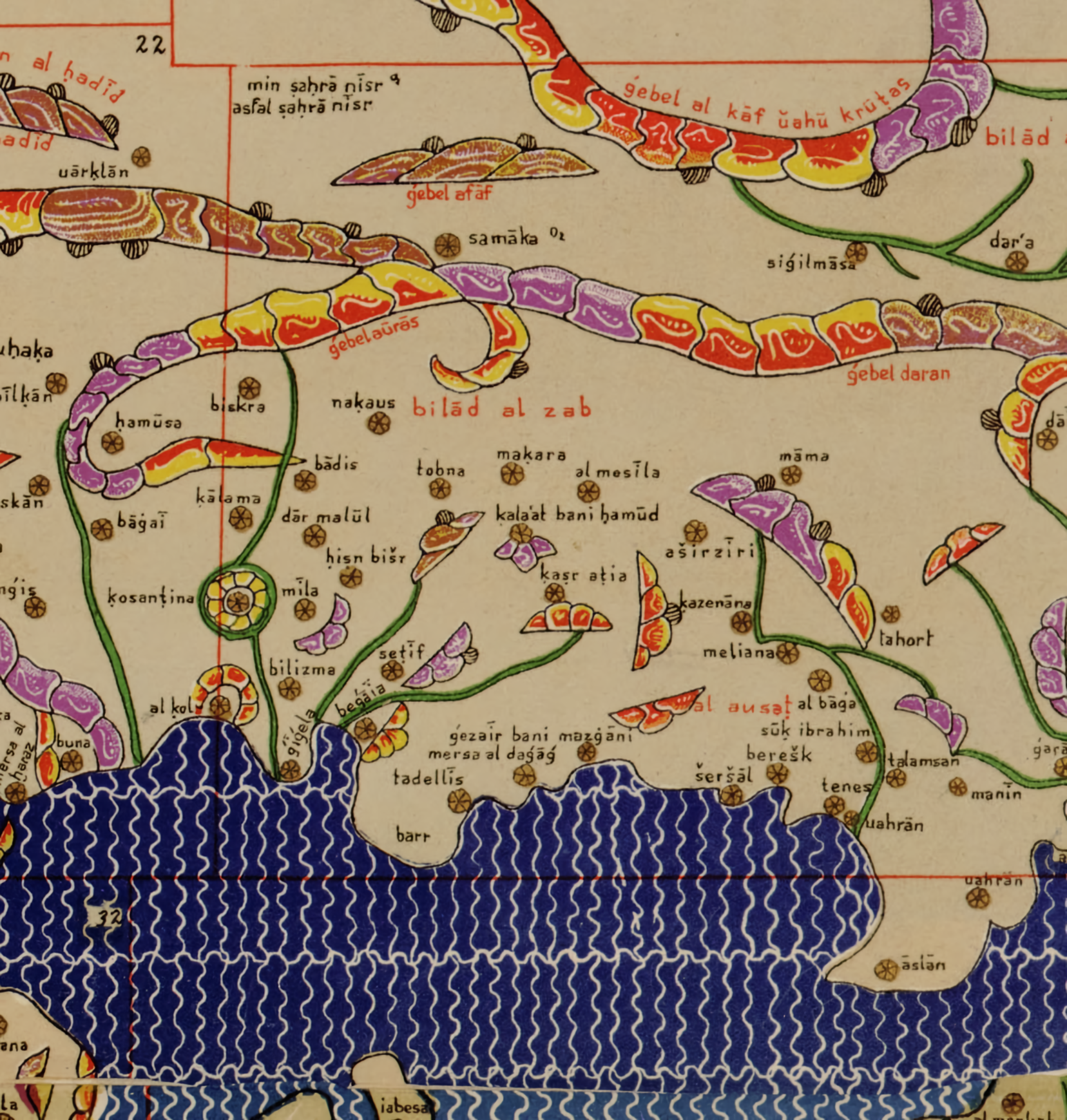
- A map of the Central Maghreb (Maghreb al-Awsat) showing the city of Tahert 'Tahort' from al-Idrisi's map, 12th century.
Date	26 August 909
Location	Tahert (present-day Tagdemt, Algeria)
Result	Fatimid victory: Destruction of the Rustamid State; Tahert was annexed to the Fatimid Caliphate

Belligerents
Fatimid Caliphate	Rustamid Imamate

Commanders and leaders
Ghazwiyya ibn Yusuf	Yaqzan ibn Muhammad

Strength
Unknown	Unknown

Casualties and losses
Unknown	8,000 killed

The capture of Tahert or the Siege of Tahert occurred on August 26, 909 AD, at the city of Tahert (present-day Tagdemt), when the Fatimid army led by Ghazwiyya ibn Yusuf besieged and toppled the city, leading to the end of the Rustamid state, the surviving population migrated to Ouargla, from where they later moved to the Mzab region in the 11th century.
