= Hujariyya (Abbasid troops) =

Abbasid cavalry corps

Hujariyya حجرية
- Active: c. 900 – 936
- Allegiance: Abbasid Caliphate
- Type: Cavalry
- Size: Varying

The Hujariyya (Arabic: حجرية, romanized: Ḥujariyya, lit. 'Men of the Chambers') were an elite cavalry corps that was one of the chief components of the late Abbasid army, from c. 900 to their forcible disbandment in 936.

== Etymology ==
The name derives from the word for 'chamber, room' (ḥujra), and refers to troops housed and trained in or near the caliphal palace and its chambers.

== Establishment ==
The first unit of this name was established by the Abbasid caliph al-Mu'tadid (r. 892–902). They were military slaves (mamlūks or ghilmān) who were placed under the training of eunuch tutors (al-khudum al-ustādhīn) and kept under close supervision, not being allowed to exit the palace except in the company of their tutors. They fought mainly as mounted archers.

== Role and history ==
First mentioned in 900, they would form the main cavalry force of the Abbasid army in the 10th century. Despite their military prowess, they are rarely recorded as participating in campaigns or in provincial garrisons, and spent most of their time in Baghdad, where they served ostensibly as guards of the caliph, but more often as the power base of ambitious generals. One notable exception is their mobilization to confront the Qarmatian invasion of Iraq in 927, but they did not engage in combat.

By the death of al-Mu'tadid in 902, they were a significant force, and his successor, al-Muktafi (r. 902–908) increased their salaries to ensure their loyalty, especially as he moved to depose al-Mu'tadid's commander-in-chief, Badr. According to the surviving records, the senior members of the corps received 16 gold dinars, and the junior ones 12. They remained the core of the Abbasid armies under al-Muqtadir (r. 908–932), and are often recorded as rioting in demand of higher salaries and interfering in the politics of the Abbasid court. By 927, they numbered some 12,000 men, and were able to destroy their long-time rivals and competitors for the Caliphate's increasingly scarce financial resources, the more numerous Masaffi infantry corps.

== Disbandment ==
They became even more actively involved in court politics after the overthrow of al-Muqtadir, and deposed Caliph al-Qahir in 934. As a result, in 936 the strongman Ibn Ra'iq decided to eliminate them. They were ordered to accompany Caliph al-Radi to Wasit. Once there, they were mustered and those unfit for service ("the interlopers, the substitutes, the women, the traders and the refugees") dismissed. This provoked an uprising, but in a battle with Ibn Ra'iq's men, the Hujariyya were defeated with heavy loss of life. Their remnants were pursued and attacked even in Baghdad, where their quarters were plundered and torched. A few of the corps survived, and some even joined Ibn Ra'iq, but the Hujariyya as a corps was destroyed. With them perished the last body of troops still loyal to the Abbasid dynasty, rather than individual strongmen, opening the way for the establishment of Ibn Ra'iq, and other military commanders after him, as quasi-dictators over a powerless, puppet caliph.

== See also ==
- Shakiriyya
- Janissaries

== Sources ==
- Kennedy, Hugh (2001). The Armies of the Caliphs: Military and Society in the Early Islamic State. London and New York: Routledge. ISBN 0-415-25093-5.
- Kennedy, Hugh (2004) [1986]. The Prophet and the Age of the Caliphates: The Islamic Near East from the 6th to the 11th Century (Second ed.). Harlow: Longman. ISBN 978-0-582-40525-7.
- Lewis, B.; Ménage, V. L.; Pellat, Ch. & Schacht, J., eds. (1971). "Ḥud̲j̲ra". The Encyclopaedia of Islam, Second Edition. Volume III: H–Iram. Leiden: E. J. Brill. p. 545. doi:10.1163/1573-3912_islam_SIM_2929. OCLC 495469525.
