= Lares, Africa =

see Lares (disambiguation) for namesakes

Lares, also called Laribus, was a city of Roman Africa and medieval Ifriqiya, located at modern Henchir Lorbeus, Tunisia.

== Names ==
The site of present-day Lorbeus was called Laribus in Roman times. The 6th-century author Procopius wrote the name Laribouzoudoúon in Greek. The Medieval Arabic geographers Ibn Hawqal and al-Bakri wrote the name Lar(i)bus. Yaqut al-Hamawi vocalized the name as al-'Urbus, but Heinz Halm calls this "artificial". A similar spelling, al-'Urbūs, appears in the work of al-Idrisi.

== Geography ==
The site of Laribus is located at the foot of Djebel Lorbeus, on a well-watered plain traversed by the Oued Lorbeus. This area has very fertile soil and (at least) in the early middle ages was densely populated. In the 6th century, this whole area was well-forested, but by the middle ages most of the forests had been cut down.

To the south of Laribus is the large plain of Ebba and El Ksour. On this plain, 16 km southwest of Laribus at the foot of Djebel Ubba, was the early medieval city of Ubba, which was a dependency of Laribus. On the east, Laribus bordered the fertile plain belonging to Tamajanna, another early medieval city under its administration. Finally, to the west was the city of Sicca Veneria (now called El Kef).

Laribus was an important crossroads both in late antiquity and in the early middle ages. In late antiquity, it was where the main route from Aquae Regiae (west of Qayrawan) to Assuras met the route from Theveste to Carthage. In the middle ages, this was an important crossroads with routes leading to Qayrawan (by way of Ubba or Tamajanna) in the east, Baja and Tunis to the north, and the Zab region (by way of the Oued Mellègue and Fahs al-Bull) to the west.

Medieval sources described Laribus as having two springs: 'Ayn Rabah, which was within the citadel walls, and 'Ayn Ziyad, which was considered the better of the two and served as the main supply of drinking water.

== History ==
Laribus was built up under the reign of Justinian, forming part of the second line of fortifications defending Roman Africa against invasion from the southwest. It was behind the forts at Tebessa and Haydra in this system, and it was also protected by the fort at Thucca Terenbenthina. Laribus itself controlled access to the Medjerda valley from the west. It held major strategic importance, and was accordingly one of the strongest fortresses in Roman Africa.

Laribus remained under Byzantine control until the early 8th century. When the city of Carthage was captured by Arab forces in the late 690s, Byzantine and Berber troops withdrew to Laribus; they remained there until Musa ibn Nusayr's campaign in the region. Under the Umayyad Caliphate, a jund was stationed at Laribus. It saw action during the Berber Revolt in the 740s.

Under the Abbasid Caliphate, a Syrian jund was garrisoned at Laribus. After the death of the provincial governor al-Fadl ibn Rawh ibn Hatim al-Muhallabi, there was a regional civil war between powerful Arab families, and one side concentrated its forces at Laribus before marching on the provincial capital of Qayrawan. Throughout this period, Laribus's city walls appear to have remained intact.

=== Aghlabid rule ===
Under the Aghlabids, Laribus held major strategic importance as a gateway between Qayrawan and the Tell region. Ibn al-Athir later called Laribus the "gateway to Ifriqiya". Mohamed Talbi described Laribus as the single most important stronghold in northwestern Ifriqiya under Aghlabid rule. In 824, the city's jund joined the revolt of Mansur al-Tunbudhi, the ruler of Tunbudha. When a power struggle broke out between Mansur and Amir ibn Nafi, Laribus and its jund initially gave Mansur refuge, but after being besieged with catapults, they handed him over and joined Amir's side. Laribus then served as Amir's headquarters until he died in 828. The city then stayed under Aghlabid control and its jund did not take part in the rebellion of Salim ibn Jalbun in 847. In 893, the jund of Laribus joined an unsuccessful revolt against Ibrahim II.

At the end of the 9th century, Ya'qubi described Laribus's population as a mix of Berbers and Arabs.

At the end of October 907, after Abu Abdallah al-Shi'i had conquered the western part of Aghlabid territory, Ziyadat Allah III hastily mustered a defense force at Laribus, leaving it under the command of the prince Ibrahim ibn Abi al-Aghlab. They expected Abu Abdallah to take this route en route to Qayrawan, and Ibrahim remained at Laribus during the entire winter of 907-8. Abu Abdallah avoided a direct confrontation with the Aghlabid army and instead took a long detour to the south, by way of Kasserine. In early 908, Ibrahim marched south to stop Abu Abdallah's advance, and the two armies fought an inconclusive battle at Dar Madyan. Ibrahim returned to Laribus, while Abu Abdallah headed eastward before turning back. The next year, Abu Abdallah's forces resumed the offensive, capturing Shaqbanariya and directly besieging Laribus.

The deciding battle took place at Laribus on 18 March, 909. The fighting lasted until the asr prayer (late afternoon), when a unit of 575 Kutama warriors, having circled around the battlefield in a deep streambed, attacked the Aghlabid army in the flank. The Aghlabid army then fled. Its commander, Ibrahim ibn Abi al-Aghlab, headed back towards Kairouan with what remained of his army. The next day, 19 March, Laribus offered an unconditional surrender to the Kutama, who then massacred its inhabitants and looted the city. (The inhabitants had taken shelter in the city's mosque).

The fall of Laribus marked the end of the Aghlabid dynasty. News of the defeat reached Raqqada the same day, and Ziyadat Allah fled by torchlight that evening.

=== Later history ===
Although its fortifications were heavily damaged by the siege of 909, Laribus remained an important garrison center under the Fatimids, although the Arab jund was replaced with a Kutama garrison. In 944, the city was captured by Abu Yazid's forces, who sacked and burned the city.

Around this time, it seems that Laribus was made into an administrative unit headed by a wali, along with neighboring Ubba. (Before this, it was probably under the governor of Baja.) In 382 AH (992-3 CE), the Zirid ruler al-Mansur dismissed the governor of Laribus and appointed his freedman Qaysar in charge of the city. Laribus remained under Zirid control until 445 AH (1053-4 CE), when the Banu Hilal captured it and Ubba. Laribus was briefly taken over by the Hammadid al-Nasir in 1065 and 1068. After the first capture, the Banu Hilal retook the city and by 1067-8 had appointed a governor named Ibn Makraz over Laribus (probably a Riyahdid); al-Nasir besieged and captured Laribus and executed Ibn Makraz. Afterwards, a local shaykh was in charge; he appealed to the ruler of Shaqbanariya to help drive out the Banu Hilal. Laribus was no longer on commercial routes or held strategic importance, and it quickly declined.

== Fortifications ==
The citadel of Laribus was enclosed by a stone rampart measuring 220 x 203 meters. By the time of al-Idrisi, this enclosure had been reworked with rammed earth. Inside the walls, set back a little, was a single tower that served as both a watchtower and a defensive stronghold.

== Economy ==
In the middle ages, the agriculture around Laribus included abundant wheat, barley, and various fruits. Laribus was also a producer of saffron, which was considered the best in Ifriqiya. There was also an iron mine near the city. The city had silos serving as storehouses for paying taxes in kind.

== Ecclesiastical history ==
The bishopric of Lares in the Late Roman province of Africa Proconsularis was a suffragan of its capital Carthage's Metropolitan Archbishopric, but like most was to fade.

The diocese was nominally restored as a Latin Catholic titular bishopric in the 18th century, until 1933 also called Lari in Curiate Italian.

It has had the following incumbents, of the lowest (episcopal) rank with two archiepiscopal (intermediary) exceptions:

- Bishop-elect Dionisio Francisco Mellado Eguíluz (1716.03.30 – ?)
- Juan Llano Ponte (1769.11.20 – 1791.09.26)
- Tommaso Gallarati Scotti (1794.02.21 – 1804.07.10)
- Domenico Lombardi (1821.08.13 – ?)
- Jules-François Philippe, Fransalians (M.S.F.S.) (1886.08.24 – 1904.04.16)
- Joaquim Antônio d’Almeida (1915.06.14 – 1947.04.01)
- Richard Henry Ackerman, Holy Ghost Fathers (C.S.Sp.) (1956.04.06 – 1960.04.04)
- Luis Aponte Martinez (1960.07.23 – 1963.04.16) (later Cardinal*)
- Titular Archbishop Rubén Isaza Restrepo (1964.01.03 – 1974.10.03)
- Justo Oscar Laguna (1975.02.01 – 1980.01.22)
- Eduardo Ernesto FuentesRuysschaert Duarte (1980.04.09 – 1982.10.18)
- Titular Archbishop Ambrose Battista De Paoli (1983.09.23 – 2007.10.10)
- William Patrick Callahan, Conventual Franciscans (O.F.M. Conv.) (2007.10.30 – 2010.06.11)
- Thomas Eusebios Naickamparampil (2010.07.14 – 2016.01.04), as first Exarch of the Syro-Malankara Catholic Apostolic Exarchate of the United States of America, until promoted first Eparch of St. Mary, Queen of Peace, of the United States of America and Canada

== See also ==
- List of Catholic titular sees

== Source and External links ==
- GCatholic with titular incumbent bio links
