= Fatimid army =

Land force of the Fatimid Caliphate

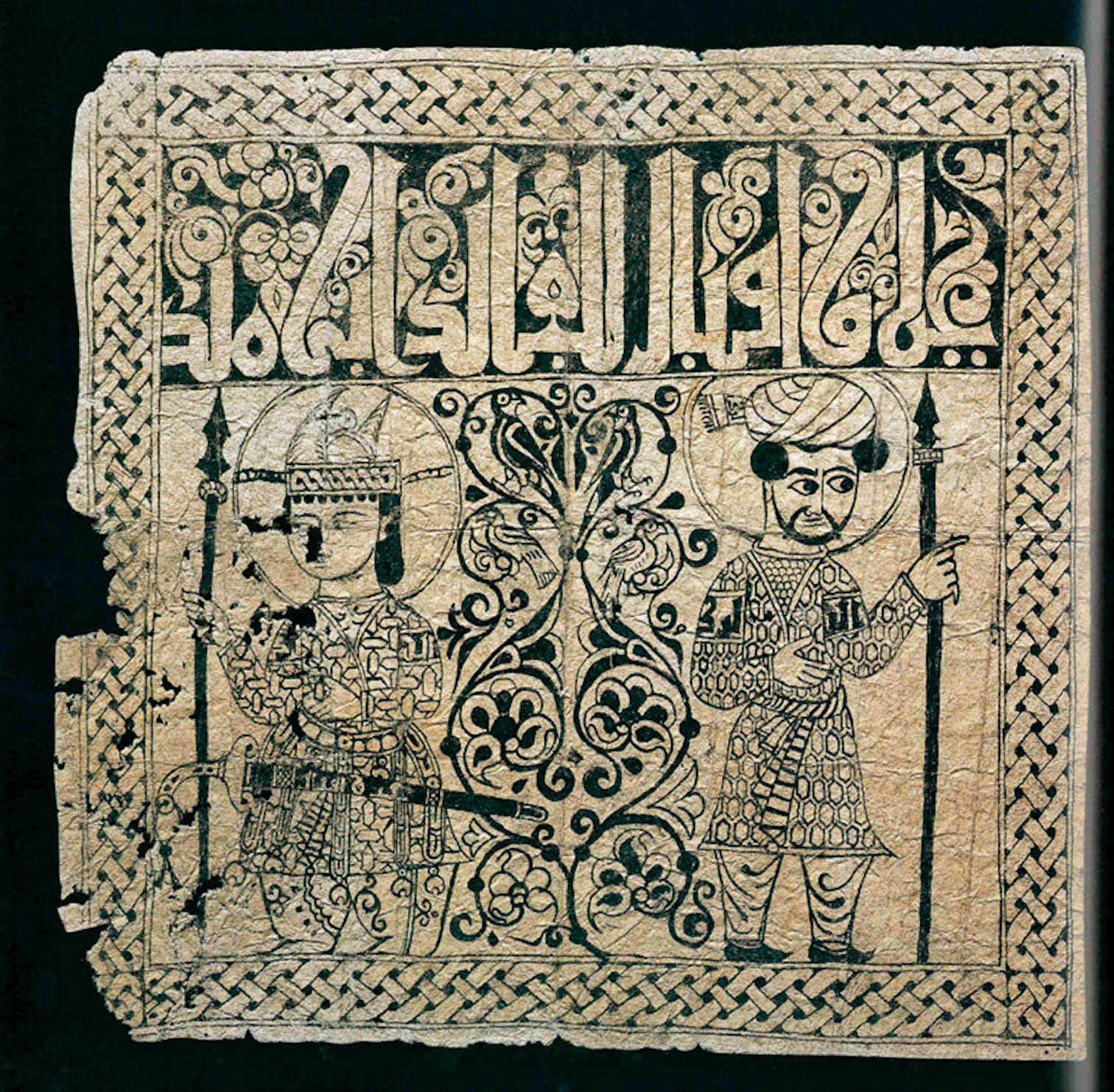
- 11th-century drawing of two Fatimid soldiers, Museum of Islamic Art, Cairo
- Founded: 893
- Dissolved: 1169
- Allegiance: Fatimid Caliphate
- Headquarters: Tazrut (893–902); Ikjan (902–909); Raqqada (909–921); Mahdia (921–948); al-Mansuriya (948–973); Cairo (973–1171)
- Active regions: North Africa, Sicily and southern Italy, Levant
- Ideology: Isma'ilism, Jihad

The Fatimid army was the land force of the Fatimid Empire (893–1171). Like the other armies of the medieval Islamic world, it was a multi-ethnic army. The core of the Fatimid army emerged from the Berber Kutama tribe, who had accepted the Isma'ili Dawah of Abu Abdallah al-Shi'i and overthrown the Aghlabids of Ifriqiya between 902 and 909. Very quickly the Kutama were supplemented with other ethnic contingents, such as the Rūm (Byzantine Greeks) and the Sudān (Black Africans), inherited from the Aghlabid military, but the Berbers remained the mainstay of Fatimid armies until the 970s, when the Fatimid conquest of Egypt and their subsequent expansion into Syria brought them into conflict with the Turkic ghulām cavalry of the eastern Islamic world. The Fatimids began to incorporate Turks and Daylamites in large numbers into their army, which led to—often bloody—rivalry with the Kutama. The Turks enjoyed an almost absolute ascendancy during the chaotic years 1062–1073, when the Fatimid regime almost collapsed during the Mustansirite Hardship. Their regime was ended by the Armenian Badr al-Jamali, who instituted a quasi-military dictatorship under the guise of an all-powerful vizierate, which effectively reduced the Fatimid caliphs to puppets. Under Badr and his successors, the Armenians rose to prominence in state and army, and during the final century of the Fatimid state it was them and the Sudān who provided the bulk of the Fatimid armies, until their power was broken by Saladin in the Battle of the Blacks in 1169.

The fighting record of the Fatimid army was mixed. It began as a quasi-revolutionary force during its early decades, when it was marked by indiscipline and tribal rivalries, which resulted in the failure of the first attempts to conquer Egypt. As the Fatimid regime consolidated itself, however, the army's quality improved, and during the conflicts of the 950s in North Africa and against the Byzantine Empire in Sicily, it performed well. The conquest of Egypt in 969, a watershed moment in the Fatimid Caliphate's history, was a political rather than a military triumph, and the subsequent advance into the Levant brought the Fatimid military to face with enemies—the Turks, the Qarmatians, and the Byzantines—that it struggled to defeat. During the crisis of the mid-11th century, the military became the real power brokers in the Fatimid state, culminating in the rise of Badr al-Jamali. During the Crusades, the Fatimid army again performed unsatisfactorily: while large and relatively strong on paper, it repeatedly failed to defeat the Crusaders, and by the end of the Fatimid regime it had become the object of derision among its Christian and Muslim enemies alike. When Saladin took power in Egypt and abolished the Fatimid dynasty, he almost completely disbanded the Fatimid army; very few Fatimid troops were taken over into the armies of Saladin's Ayyubid Sultanate.

== Organization ==
The organization of the Fatimid army at any particular moment in time is difficult to determine, as at different times it recruited its troops from different ethnicities, fielded a different mix of troop types and with different status (free or slave). Originally dominated by the Kutama Berbers who bore the dynasty to power, the Fatimid army from the beginning incorporated additional ethnicities inherited from the Aghlabid army, and throughout its history was what the military historian Yaacov Lev has described as a "multi-ethnic army with a very marked congruence of military specialization and ethnic origin"; this internal division into ethnic lines however also negatively affected its discipline and cohesion.

=== Administration and pay ===
The expenses of maintaining a standing army were enormous: in the words of the historian Claude Cahen, in the medieval Islamic world "the chief preoccupation, whether of the soldiers or of the power they served, was the provision for their pay (riqz, khubz)". Cahen stresses that detailed information is "scattered and inaccurate", but during the 10th century an infantryman in Iraq could expect a yearly pay of between 500 and 1,000 silver dirham, approximately two to three times as much as an artisan. Cavalrymen were paid twice the amount as infantrymen, and commanders multiple times that.

Following the model common in the Islamic world, the army was administered by a special fiscal bureau (dīwān), the 'department for the armies and recruitment' (dīwān al-juyūsh wa'l-rawātib). The government was also responsible for providing the troops with additional weaponry—often bought at the open market in Cairo—as well as horses and pack animals; Caliph al-Aziz is said to have maintained a stable of 12,000 horses and 36,000 camels for the purpose. During the first years of Caliph al-Hakim bi-Amr Allah (r. 996–1021), salaries were paid eight times a year, but by al-Mustansir Billah's time (r. 1036–1094) this had changed to monthly payments, which was the system retained until the end of the Fatimid state. Like the Abbasids before them, the Fatimids also awarded land grants (iqṭāʾ) to their troops for their upkeep. Under al-Hakim, such grants were made even to ordinary soldiers. Bedouin tribes also received iqṭāʾ, but usually these were chosen among the less productive lands, and had to be supplemented by a monetary stipend. While regular soldiers were allocated individual grants (iqṭāʿ jayshī), Bedouin companies were allocated collective iqṭāʾs.

The economic problems that began in the late 10th century meant that the troops were sometimes left unpaid, leading to indiscipline and protests by the soldiers: the army rioted and ransacked Cairo in 1024, and in 1036, one of the exasperated soldiers threw a javelin that just missed killing al-Mustansir. The military's dissatisfaction over lack of pay was the main reason for the anarchy between 1062, which led to the virtual disintegration of both army and country, that lasted until the rise to power of Badr al-Jamali in 1073. Many soldiers resorted to farming their estates when plagues killed much of the peasantry in the mid-11th century. As in other areas of the Muslim world using the iqṭāʾ system, it led to deteriorating quality of land, and after Badr al-Jamali came to power, he engaged in reforms aiming to address the problem.

While previously the bulk of the army had been paid salaries directly from the dīwān, Badr al-Jamali's reforms generalized the use of iqṭāʾ for the upkeep of the soldiers. Most of the revenue from an iqṭāʾ still went to the state, but its recipient (muqṭāʾ) was still entitled to a fixed stipend (ʿibra) from it. Unlike the contemporary Seljuk model, the muqṭāʾ did not hold administrative powers over his grant. Nevertheless, the reform bound the soldiers to the land, and inaugurated a system that survived into the Mamluk Sultanate.

Several commanders are known to have raised and maintained armed retinues from these estates, and to have used them as normal troops on campaign.

=== Structure and command ===
Little is known about the details of the organization of the Fatimid army. Following the model current in the Islamic world, the Fatimid army was originally divided into ethnic and tribal units, which also generally coincided with functional distinctions of light and heavy cavalry, infantry, etc. Other units were established as the result of recruitment by specific generals or monarchs, establishing a strong group identity and henceforth being known after their founders. Each of the various corps of the Fatimid army was further subdivided into units with a base of ten. In the 12th century the Fatimids also established the Hujariyya, a special cadet corps, which was subdivided was according to age. Regular musters for the inspection of the troops (ʿarḍ) are known, following the Abbasid model, either ad hoc before major battles or campaigns, or as a regular, annual occurrence under al-Aziz, although al-Hakim stopped the practice.

The officer corps (amīrs or qāʾids, lit. 'commanders') were divided into three grades, distinguished by dress, according to the size of their commands: the highest-ranked wore golden collars (arbāb al-aṭwāq or al-umarāʾ al-mutawwaqūn), the next held silver batons (arbāb al-quḍub al-fiḍḍa), and the lesser commanders (adwān al-umarāʾ) had no distinctive insignia. The existence of sub-units of the ethnic contingents is known, but no details on the distinction between the various titles or their responsibilities survives. In the 11th century, each ethnic contingent apparently had an auditor (zimām), often a member of the caliphal secretariat, who was responsible for mediating between the unit and the caliph.

The most senior Fatimid commander was usually the commander-in-chief of the army in Syria, who bore the title of amīr al-umarāʾ ('commander of commanders') or amīr al-juyūsh ('commander of the armies'). The latter title was borne by Badr al-Jamali when he came to power, and henceforth designated the quasi-dictatorial viziers who ruled the Fatimid state almost without interruption until its end.

Despite the high prestige of the Turkish ghulām cavalry, during the 11th century the bulk of the Fatimid field armies remained infantry, with the cavalry (usually augmented by Bedouin tribesmen), positioned on the flanks.

=== Numbers ===
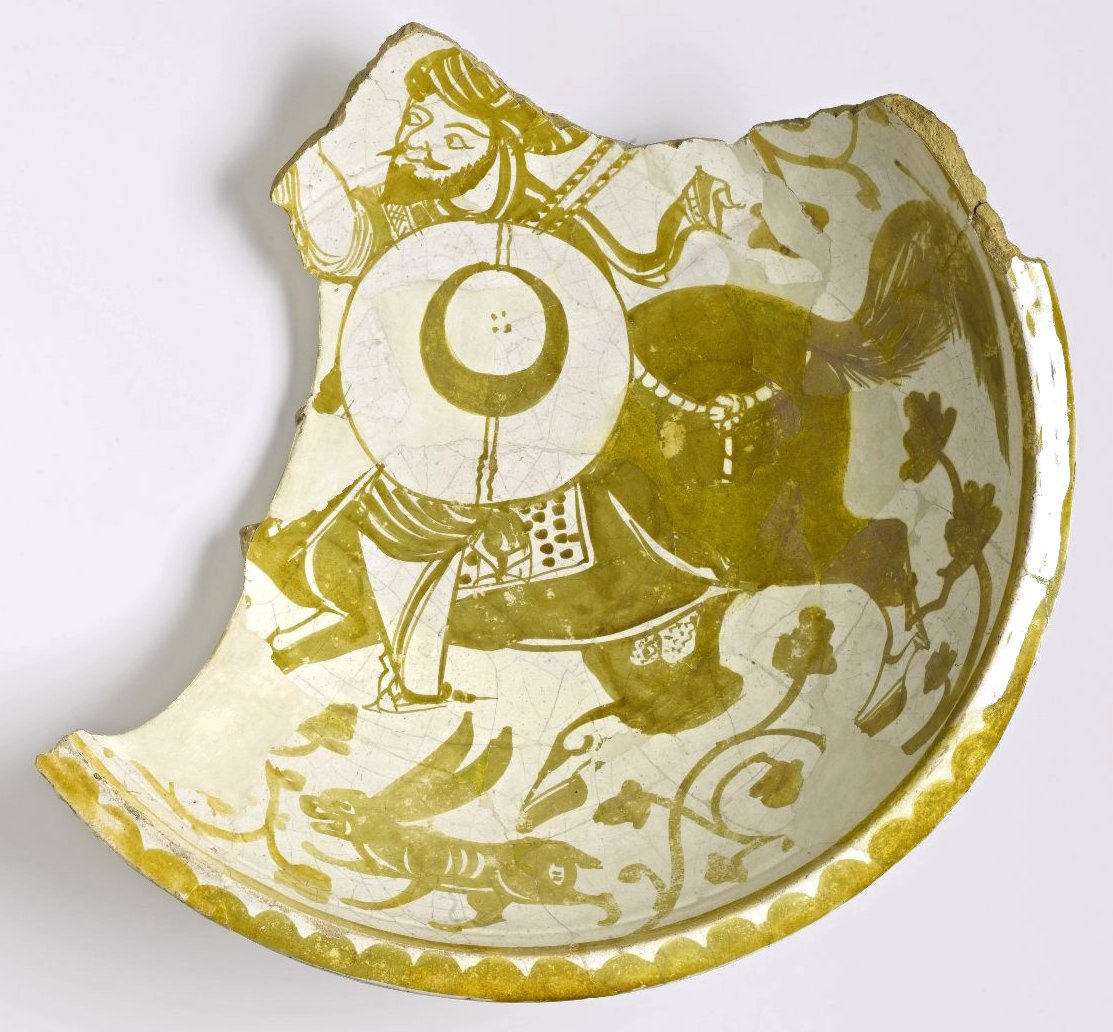
Bowl depicting a mounted warrior, 11th century, now in the Brooklyn Museum

It is difficult to estimate the size of the Fatimid army. Medieval sources provide vastly exaggerated numbers, such as 100,000 or even 200,000 men during Jawhar's invasion of Egypt, a claim that 300,000 men were stationed in Egypt alone during a parade in 993, and 215,000 reported by Nasir Khusraw in 1047. Such numbers are dubious, as it is known that the cost of professional army was enormous; during the heyday of the Abbasid Caliphate in the 9th century, a standing army of 50,000 men required no less than 14 million gold dinars per year for their upkeep. In addition, in accounts of individual battles, even crucial ones, the figures mentioned are usually around the 10,000 mark.

During the late Fatimid period, more conservative figures are given: the 14th-century Egyptian historian al-Maqrizi quotes an account by the head of the dīwān al-juyūsh, Ibn Mammati, that during the vizierate of Tala'i ibn Ruzzik (1154–1161), the army comprised 40,000 cavalry and 30,000 Black African infantry. At another point, however, referring to the same account, al-Maqrizi writes of 40,000 cavalry, 36,000 infantry, and 10,000 marines on ten galleys. These figures too are considered implausible by modern scholars, even if they are interpreted to include auxiliary forces and volunteers; as the historian Yaacov Lev points out, particularly the high ratio of cavalry to infantry is implausible, as is the ratio of 1,000 marines to one galley. Much more plausible are the figures given elsewhere by al-Maqrizi, referring to the late 1160s, during Shirkuh's arrival in Egypt: 10,000 cavalry, 40,0000 Black African infantry, and 10,000 marines and iqṭāʾ troops.

=== Ethnic contingents ===
The early Fatimid armies in Ifriqiya relied mostly on the Kutama Berbers, as they were the first adherents of the Fatimid daʿwa and had borne them to power. Other ethnic contingents were also recruited or absorbed during the conquest of Aghlabid Ifriqiya and Ikhshidid Egypt, but it was not until the Fatimids expanded into the Levant, where they came into contact and conflict with the more advanced imperial military organizations of the Byzantine Empire and the Buyids, who followed the earlier Abbasid model, that the shortcomings of their own military became apparent. This led to a reform under the Caliph al-Aziz Billah (r. 975–996), with the help of the vizier Ya'qub ibn Killis, and brought the Fatimid military more in line with practices in the eastern Islamic world, most notably in the use of Turkish ghilmān.

==== Kutama and other Berbers ====
The Kutama were the mainstay and elite of the early Fatimid armies. It was among the Kutama that Abu Abdallah al-Shi'i began his revolutionary propaganda in favour of the Fatimids, and it was from them that he raised the army that between 903 and 909 overthrew the Aghlabids and established the Fatimid Caliphate in Ifriqiya. Although other Berber tribes soon flocked to the Fatimid banner—notably the large Sanhaja confederation during the reign of al-Mansur bi-Nasr Allah—the Kutama continued to provide the bulk of the Fatimid armies until after the Fatimid conquest of Egypt in 969. Al-Maqrizi calls them "the [chosen] people of the dynasty" (ahl al-dawla), while the early Fatimid caliphs singled them out as the awlīyāʾ, the 'friends' of God and of the dynasty, and as muʾminūn, the 'faithful', distinct from the mass of ordinary Muslims. According to the historian Heinz Halm, the early Fatimid state can be likened to a "hegemony of the Kutama". In 948, Caliph al-Mansur publicly remarked that God had granted the Kutama pre-eminence among all other peoples, since they had first seen and accepted the truth.

On the other hand, this dominion of the semi-civilized Kutama was greatly resented, not only by the other Berber tribes, but chiefly by the inhabitants of the cities, where the Arabic culture predominated. As Halm writes, the situation was similar to a scenario where, "in the early eighteenth-century North America, the Iroquois, converted to Catholicism by Jesuit missionaries, had overrun the Puritan provinces of New England, installed their chieftains as governors in Boston, Providence and Hartford, and proclaimed a European with dubious credentials as King of England". Inevitably, the arrogance and exactions of the Kutama led to rebellions in the newly conquered Fatimid domains, in which the Kutama particularly were singled out and killed by the rebels. During the early Fatimid invasions of Egypt, the Kutama-based Fatimid army also suffered from indiscipline.

After the move of the seat of the caliphate to Egypt in 973, a large number of Kutama accompanied the dynasty east, while the Sanhaja, under the leadership of the Zirid dynasty, were left behind to uphold Fatimid authority and the Isma'ili doctrine in Ifriqiya. Rather superficially converted amidst a largely Sunni population, the Sanhaja and the Zirids were unable (or unwilling) to prevent the resurgence of Sunnism, the massacre of the Isma'ili communities of Ifriqiya in 1016/7, and the eventual break of the Zirid dynasty from even nominal recognition of Fatimid overlordship during the 11th century.

However, the forays into the Levant in the 970s revealed the inadequacies of an army based solely on the Kutama, and from 978, the Fatimids began incorporating ethnic groups, notably the Turks and Daylamites, from the eastern Islamic lands into their army. In combination with the increasing difficulty of renewing their pool of Kutama recruits after c. 987/88, these events challenged the hitherto dominant position of the Kutama in the army. Thereafter, a fierce rivalry developed between the Kutama and the 'Easterners' (Mashāriqa). In 996, on the accession of al-Hakim bi-Amr Allah, the Kutama refused to acknowledge the new caliph unless the Kutama leader al-Hasan ibn Ammar was appointed as vizier. This was done but Ibn Ammar's blatantly pro-Berber regime quickly alienated other members of the elite, and he was overthrown a year later. Finally, when al-Hakim assumed the reins of government in 1000, he launched a purge of the Fatimid elites, during which Ibn Ammar and many of the other prominent Kutama were executed.

Thereafter the position of the Kutama steadily declined, so that in November 1025, during an official review, the once numerous and proud Kutama were reduced to demanding bread to sate their hunger. Shortly after, they were unable to mobilize even 100 horsemen at short notice. On the other hand, the Persian traveller Nasir Khusraw mentions that there were 20,000 Kutama horsemen during his visit to Egypt in 1047. During the chaos of the years 1062–1073, the Kutama allied themselves with the Sudān against the Turks and the Daylamites. The last remnants of the Kutama were dismissed from the Fatimid army after Badr al-Jamali came to power in 1073.

Other Berber groups attested in the Fatimid army were the Bāṭiliyya or Bāṭilīs ('the Champions'), who participated in the conquest of Egypt and had a quarter of their own in Cairo. Nasir Khusraw reported seeing 15,000 Bāṭili horsemen during a military review in Cairo. The Barqiyya were another group of Berber origin (from Barqa) which is first mentioned as part of Jawhar's army.

The last major Berber regiment are the Maṣāmida, recruited from the High Atlas. They are stated to have been first recruited under al-Aziz Billah, but only appear in the sources in the mid-11th century, in the account of Nasir Khusraw. They numbered 20,000 infantry armed with spear and sword, and were often used to garrison cities in Syria. They apparently survived the regime of Badr al-Jamali, since they reappear briefly during the vizierate of al-Ma'mun al-Bata'ihi (1121–1125).

==== Rūm and Ṣaqāliba ====
Already following the overthrow of the Aghlabid dynasty, the Fatimids incorporated remnants of the defeated Aghlabid military into their own army. Among them were the Rūm. The term normally denotes specifically Byzantine Greeks, but probably also included slaves of European origin bought or captured in raids in Italy and elsewhere. The Rūm followed Jawhar in his conquest of Egypt, and were given their own quarter in Cairo. They are still attested in Fatimid service until the early years of the 11th century, both as slaves (mamlūks) as well as mercenaries (al-murtaziqa). The Cairo quarter of the Rūm was destroyed in 1009 on the orders of Caliph al-Hakim, possibly also signalling their expulsion from the army at the same time. According to the contemporary Syrian Christian chronicler Yahya of Antioch, during al-Hakim's persecution of the Christians, most of the Rūm soldiers converted to Islam, but secretly intended to defect to the Byzantines.

A similar group in many respects were the Ṣaqāliba ('Slavs', sing. Ṣaqlabī), a term frequently applied to European slaves in Islamic lands, but not tied to a specific ethnic or regional origin. The Ṣaqāliba were also extensively used by the Aghlabids, and were inherited by the Fatimids, who used them in their military, court, and administration. The Ṣaqāliba provided many of the court eunuchs that were entrusted with high offices and military commands, particularly under Caliph al-Mu'izz. Such were the chamberlain Jawdhar, Sabir al-Fata, who led naval raids against the Italian coasts, the eunuch general Qaysar, the general Muzaffar, and even Jawhar, the conqueror of Egypt. Barjawan, the quasi-dictator in 996–1000, may also have been one of them.

The Ṣaqāliba enjoyed the peak of their prominence in the late 10th century. They too moved to Egypt with Jawhar, and a lane in Cairo was named after them. More Ṣaqāliba were inherited from the Ikhshidids after the conquest of Egypt, and in 974/5, Caliph al-Mu'izz bought all privately owned Ṣaqāliba. As the Hamdanid dynasty of Aleppo declined during the late 10th century, many of their Ṣaqāliba were also taken over into Fatimid service, while the Iberian Peninsula proved a major source of new Ṣaqāliba recruits.

While the Ṣaqāliba are mentioned in records as forming a distinct contingent of the Fatimid army, their role is obscure, and most of their members mentioned in the sources are associated with administrative or courtly functions rather than as soldiers. With the arrival of the Turks, they began to lose their prominent position, but remained favoured for the prestigious court function of ṣāḥib al-miẓalla (bearer of the miẓalla, likely a sort of parasol and one of the chief regalia of the Abbasid and Fatimid caliphs), a position that ranked fourth in the administrative hierarchy of the Fatimid state.

The Ṣaqāliba are still mentioned as a distinct palace corps in 1024/5, but by Nasir Khusraw's time a generation later they appear to have been replaced by the black and white palace eunuchs (ustādhs).

==== Black Africans (Sudān) ====
As with the Rūm, the Fatimids inherited from the Aghlabids the use of Black African slave-soldiers (Sudān or ʿabīd, more fully ʿabīd al-shirāʾ, 'bought slaves'), who were in widespread use in the Islamic world. The Fatimid ʿabīd are known to have been active in Ifriqiya alongside the Kutama. Already Caliph al-Mahdi recruited blacks into his army, and in 935, a black commander, Sandal, led an expedition against Fez in Morocco. Blacks are not mentioned in Jawhar's army of conquest, unless the Zuwayla can be identified as blacks.

However black troops were heavily used by the previous Egyptian regimes of the Ikhshidids and Tulunids, and the conquest of the county opened a more direct way of recruitment via the Nubian kingdoms to the south of Egypt. Under Caliph al-Hakim bi-Amr Allah (r. 996–1021), the corps was greatly expanded, as the Caliph bought up black slaves in large numbers, setting them free and taking them into his service. Black slaves are thus mentioned during the Revolt of Tyre (996–998).

A number of distinct corps were apparently formed from the ʿabīd: the ʿAbīd al-Jawwāla, the al-Faraḥiyya, the ʿAṭūfiyya, and especially al-Hakim's sword-armed personal guard, the al-Saʿdiyya. The al-Saʿdiyya were sufficiently prominent that Byzantine envoys visiting the court brought gifts specifically for them, but in 1005 al-Hakim suddenly, for reasons unknown, purged the unit, killing its commander and half of its 100 men.

The influx of black soldiers upset the balance with the other groups, as well as relations with the civilian population, who were exposed to plundering and even killings at the hands of the ʿabīd. Al-Hakim put officers of the ʿabīd in command of the Turks in a deliberate move to humiliate the latter for their unruliness; the result was a major battle between the two groups in February/March 1020. On occasion, the ʿabīd also joined with other military corps in looting the markets, or assaulting the non-Muslim population of Cairo. This unruliness continued during the reign of al-Zahir (r. 1021–1036), particularly as the economic crisis hit the army and diminished both its fighting ability and its discipline. The situation was so bad, that the ʿabid were reportedly reduced to eating dogs, as they did not receive any pay; repeated riots and mutinies are recorded for the years 1024–25. Nevertheless, they remained quite numerous: Nasir Khusraw mentions 30,000 ʿabīd, but also 20,000 Maṣāmida—Berbers from the western Maghreb, but Nasir Khusraw calls them black—and a further 30,000 Zanj (blacks from East Africa), who do not appear in any other source.

After Badr al-Jamali's rise to power, the existing black regiments were disbanded as too loyal to the caliph, although Badr did raise a personal guard of black troops. After the death of Badr, the blacks became the mainstay of the Fatimid army, and remained loyal to the dynasty to the end, trying unsuccessfully to revolt against Saladin when the latter's intention to depose the Fatimids became clear, in the so-called "Battle of the Blacks". Defeated, the black troops were driven out of Cairo into the country, hunted down and killed. This removed the last support of the Fatimid dynasty and left Saladin as the undisputed master of Egypt.

==== Zuwayla ====
Another early ethnic group were the Zawila or Zuwayla, who received their name from the town of the same name in Fezzan, where they were recruited or purchased. Their exact ethnic make-up—Arab, Berber, or Black African—is unclear: the town was ruled by a Berber dynasty, but it was also a centre for the African slave trade, so it is usually assumed that they were Black Africans sold into slavery.

The Zuwayla are first mentioned during the second Fatimid invasion of Egypt, where captured Zuwayla executed by the Abbasid authorities alongside captured Kutama soldiers. When al-Mahdi Billah founded a new palace city at Mahdiya, they provided part of its garrison, and the extramural suburb where they lived became known as Zawila after them.

The Zuwayla came to Egypt in Jawhar's army and were assigned a special quarter in Cairo; the Bab Zuwayla gate was also named after them. They appear in a list of military units as late as 1004/5, but thereafter vanish from the sources. The reason is unknown; they may have been disbanded, or the supply of fresh recruits stagnated and the unit lost its importance.

==== Turks and Daylamites ====
Turkic slave soldiers or ghulāms had been employed by the Ikhshidids, but it was only in 978 that Turks entered into Fatimid service, following the defeat of the Turkic ruler of Damascus, Alptakin, and his Turkic and Daylamite army. Impressed by their performance, Caliph al-Aziz pardoned Alptakin and incorporated a few thousand of his men into the Fatimid military. While Alptakin's Turks were freedmen, in the following decades, Turkic slave soldiers (ghilmān al-Atrāk) were recruited in large numbers. These came either from the slave markets of the Levant, or perhaps, with the consent of the Byzantines, from the emporia of the northern Black Sea, in the Crimea and the Sea of Azov. Other Turks are known to have entered Fatimid service after previously serving various other masters in the Middle East. By the mid-11th century, Nasir Khusraw reports that the Turks in Fatimid service had been born in Egypt.

According to Lev, "the Turks were given a privileged position and special bonds of patronage tied them to the regime". They had their own quarter, not in Cairo but in Fustat, and married local women. They are mentioned in the riots of the 1020s, fighting against the Black Africans and the Berbers. During the chaos of 1062–1073, the Turks emerged as the virtual rulers of the capital, until they were overthrown by Badr al-Jamali. They disappear thereafter, although some attempts, apparently not very successful, were made to reintroduce them to confront the Crusaders.

The Daylamites (al-Daylam), a mountain people from northern Iran, were a common source of soldiers for a number of Islamic potentates already since the 9th century. In Egypt they were closely allied to the Turks, as they entered service in the same circumstances, after Alptakin's defeat; they and the Turks shared a quarter in the capital. In 1024, the Daylamites are attested as a separate regiment, but Nasir Khusraw attests that "the Turks and Persians [are] collectively called the Mashāriqa". Nasir Khusraw also mentions that during his visit, he saw 300 Daylamites on foot escorting the caliph armed with axes and the zhupin (the characteristic Daylamite javelin or short spear).

==== Armenians ====
Armenians had been serving in the armies of Middle Eastern powers for centuries, and began entering Fatimid service after the conquest of Egypt. Known for their skills as archers, they became particularly numerous after the rise of the Armenian Badr al-Jamali to power, although they never became the majority of the army.

Along with the Black Africans, the Armenians opposed Saladin, but were defeated during the "Battle of the Blacks", massacred, and their possessions confiscated.

==== Bedouin and other auxiliaries ====
In addition to the standing regiments, the Fatimid army made use of Bedouin tribes of the Egyptian and Syrian deserts as auxiliaries. Nasir Khusraw claimed that there were no fewer than 50,000 spear-armed Bedouin in Fatimid employ. For specific campaigns, especially as part of the jihad, volunteers were summoned to supplement the standing regiments.

=== Named units ===
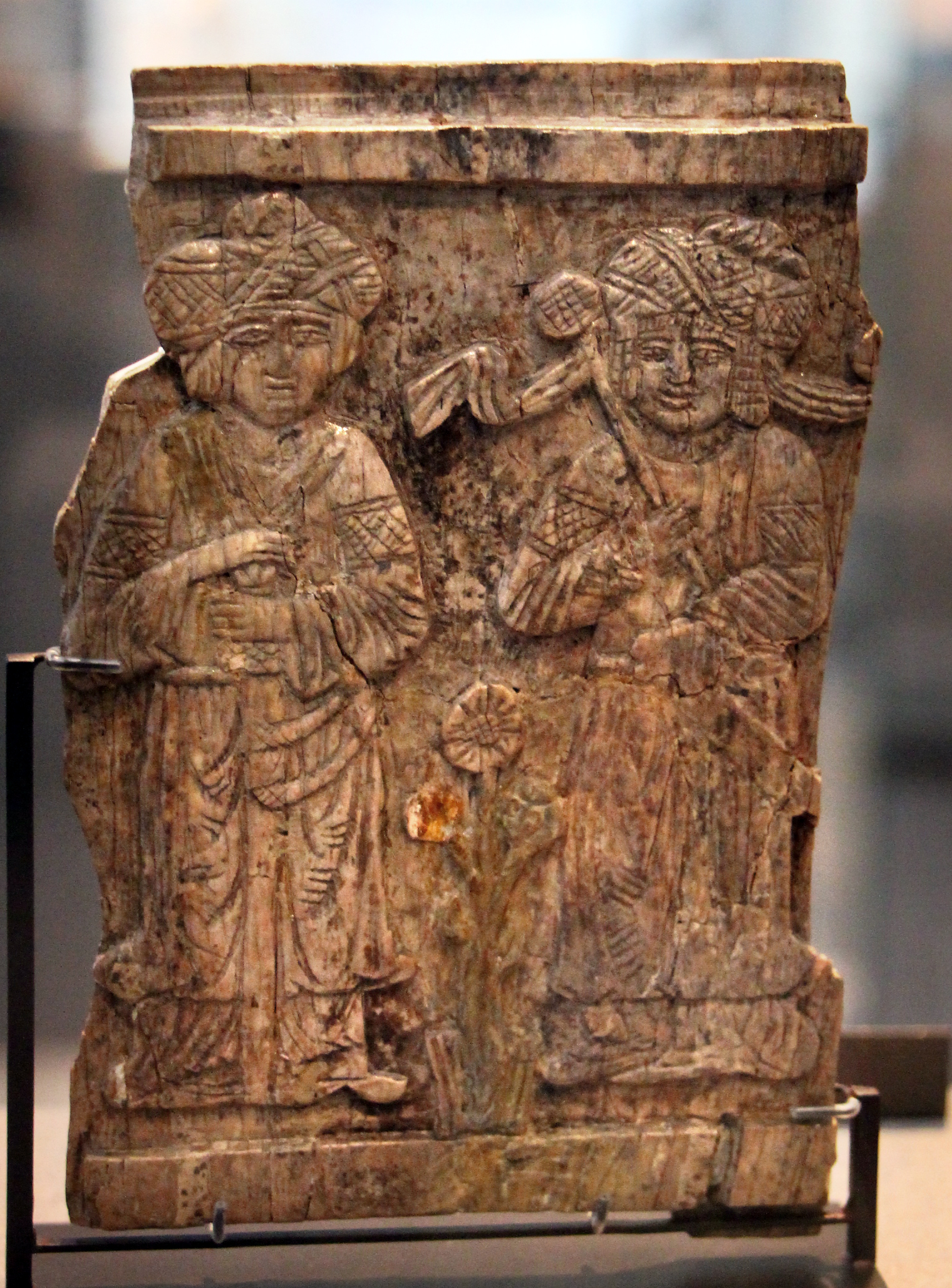
11th-century ivory plaque depicting Fatimid guardsmen, Louvre

- The caliphal bodyguard (Ḥujariyya), an elite cavalry corps created by the vizier al-Afdal Shahanshah from a previous palace school for officers. It was recruited from the sons of the military and civil elites, with the purpose of creating horsemen capable of matching the Turkic ghulāms in skill. The corps was divided into seven named barracks (ḥujarāt) during the training, and after graduation, the soldiers were known as the 'youths of the household' (ṣibyān al-khāṣṣ). Lev, State and Society, pp. 100–2
- The Afḍaliyya, the troops raised by al-Afdal
- The Āmiriyya, the troops raised by Caliph al-Amir
- The Azīziyya, Turkic ghulāms recruited by Caliph al-Aziz
- The Barqiyya, distinct from the original Berber corps of that name, this unit was raised by the vizier Tala'i ibn Ruzzik, staffed with officers, and placed under the command of Dirgham
- The Ḥāfiẓiyya, the troops raised by Caliph al-Hafiz
- The Ḥamdāniyya, former soldiers of the Hamdanid dynasty who defected to Fatimid service in 981/82. They are attested not only in Cairo, but in garrison duties in Palestine and Syria as well. Of similar provenance were the Bakjūriyya, troops incorporated into Fatimid service from the retinue of Bakjur, a former Hamdanid commander who was Fatimid governor of Damascus until his execution in 988. The two corps were closely related and officers could serve in both.
- The Ikhshīdiyya and Kāfūriyya, former Ikhshidid troops (including the men raised by the Ikhshidid regent and emir Abu al-Misk Kafur), some of whom were taken over into Fatimid service after the conquest of Egypt in 969
- The Juyūshiyya, raised by Badr al-Jamali and named after his title, amir al-juyūsh. They were possibly Armenians, or alternatively Black African infantry recruited during Badr's pacification campaigns in Upper Egypt. They were the chief pillar of the regime of Badr and al-Afdal, and were responsible for bringing Kutayfat to power in 1130. Still attested in 1149.
- The Rayḥāniyya, a Black African corps evidenced during the last decades of the dynasty. Still attested in 1149.
- The Qayṣariyya, originated as a palace guard for the princess Sitt al-Mulk. A cavalry unit, its strength is given as a thousand men in 996, and it is last attested in 1025/26. The unit's name, 'Men of the Caesar' (which would normally mean the Byzantine emperor) may indicate that it was recruited from Rūm soldiers.
- The Wazīriyya, a personal guard of the vizier Ibn Killis
- The Ẓāhiriyya, Turkic ghulāms recruited by Caliph al-Zahir

== Arms and equipment ==
Fatimid sources report on the use of siege machines already during the Ifriqiyan period of the Fatimid state, including mangonels, catapults, and siege towers. The Kutama, which formed the mainstay of the Fatimid army during its early period, were armed with swords, bows, and especially the javelin, much as their forebears in classical antiquity. They were usually unarmoured; heavy armour seems to have not been used at least until Jawhar's conquest of Egypt.

The major shift in the armament of the Fatimid armies came about as a result of their confrontation with the heavily armoured Turks of Alptakin in Syria in the 970s, which in short order led to the introduction of Turkish and Daylamite troops into the Fatimid army. Heavy cavalry, where both the rider and the horse were armoured with chainmail, are a regular feature of Fatimid armies after that point. Although a large variety of weapons is attested during the 12th century, both the infantry and the cavalry retained the javelin and the sword as their principal armaments. Weapons were produced in special state-controlled workshops, but were also imported from abroad.

== Assessment ==
During the final years of the Caliphate, the army remained large, but was largely ineffective. Its division into ethnic corps meant that it lacked cohesion, while the fact that Black African infantry comprised the bulk of its troops limited its mobility. Both the Crusaders and the Syrian Muslims were dismissive about its fighting abilities. Saladin, shortly after he took power in Egypt, destroyed the Fatimid army, at the time chiefly composed of Sudān and Armenians. The Sudān, who served as infantry, were useless to Saladin, while the Armenians largely retained their ancestral Christian faith. As a result, the "Battle of the Blacks", where the Fatimid troops were defeated and driven to flee Cairo, was at least partly cast in religious terms as an attack on infidels. Although in time Saladin would employ some of the remnants of the Fatimid army—the presence of Sudān and Maṣāmida in Cairo is attested until 1191/2—the military that Saladin built as ruler of Egypt represented, according to the historian Yaacov Lev, "a complete rupture with Fatimid military tradition and organization", being a much smaller force based almost exclusively on cavalry.

== Sources ==
- Bacharach, Jere L. (1981). "African Military Slaves in the Medieval Middle East: The Cases of Iraq (869-955) and Egypt (868-1171)". International Journal of Middle East Studies. 13 (4): 471–495. doi:10.1017/S0020743800055860. JSTOR 162910.
- Beshir, B. (1978). "Fatimid Military Organization". Der Islam. 55 (1): 37–56. doi:10.1515/islm.1978.55.1.37. ISSN 0021-1818.
- Bosworth, C. E. (1993). "Miẓalla 1. In the ʿAbbāsid and Fāṭimid caliphates". In Bosworth, C. E.; van Donzel, E.; Heinrichs, W. P. & Pellat, Ch. (eds.). The Encyclopaedia of Islam, Second Edition. Volume VII: Mif–Naz. Leiden: E. J. Brill. pp. 191–192. ISBN 978-90-04-09419-2.
- Bosworth, C. E. (1995). "al-Șaķāliba 2. In the central lands of the caliphate". In Bosworth, C. E.; van Donzel, E.; Heinrichs, W. P. & Lecomte, G. (eds.). The Encyclopaedia of Islam, Second Edition. Volume VIII: Ned–Sam. Leiden: E. J. Brill. pp. 878–879. ISBN 978-90-04-09834-3.
- Brett, Michael (2001). The Rise of the Fatimids: The World of the Mediterranean and the Middle East in the Fourth Century of the Hijra, Tenth Century CE. The Medieval Mediterranean. Vol. 30. Leiden: Brill. ISBN 90-04-11741-5.
- Brett, Michael (2017). The Fatimid Empire. The Edinburgh History of the Islamic Empires. Edinburgh: Edinburgh University Press. ISBN 978-0-7486-4076-8.
- Cahen, Claude (1965). "Djaysh I. – Classical". In Lewis, B.; Pellat, Ch. & Schacht, J. (eds.). The Encyclopaedia of Islam, Second Edition. Volume II: C–G. Leiden: E. J. Brill. pp. 504–509. OCLC 495469475.
- Canard, Marius (1965). "Fāṭimids". In Lewis, B.; Pellat, Ch. & Schacht, J. (eds.). The Encyclopaedia of Islam, Second Edition. Volume II: C–G. Leiden: E. J. Brill. pp. 850–862. OCLC 495469475.
- Daftary, Farhad (2007). The Ismāʿı̄lı̄s: Their History and Doctrines (Second ed.). Cambridge: Cambridge University Press. ISBN 978-0-521-61636-2.
- Halm, Heinz (1991). Das Reich des Mahdi: Der Aufstieg der Fatimiden [The Empire of the Mahdi: The Rise of the Fatimids] (in German). Munich: C. H. Beck. ISBN 978-3-406-35497-7.
- Lev, Yaacov (1984). "The Fāṭimid Navy, Byzantium and the Mediterranean Sea, 909–1036 CE/297–427 AH". Byzantion. 54: 220–252. ISSN 0378-2506.
- Lev, Yaacov (1987). "Army, Regime, and Society in Fatimid Egypt, 358–487/968–1094". International Journal of Middle East Studies. 19 (3): 337–365. doi:10.1017/s0020743800056762. JSTOR 163658.
- Lev, Yaacov (1988). "The Fāṭimids and Egypt 301-358/914-969". Arabica. 35 (2): 186–196. doi:10.1163/157005888X00332.
- Lev, Yaacov (1991). State and Society in Fatimid Egypt. Leiden: Brill. ISBN 90-04-09344-3.
- Lev, Yaacov (1999). Saladin in Egypt. Leiden, Boston, Köln: Brill. ISBN 90-04-11221-9.
- Sanders, Paula (1994). Ritual, Politics, and the City in Fatimid Cairo. Albany, new York: State University of New York Press. ISBN 0-7914-1781-6.
- Vikør, K. S. (2002). "Zawīla". In Bearman, P. J.; Bianquis, Th.; Bosworth, C. E.; van Donzel, E. & Heinrichs, W. P. (eds.). The Encyclopaedia of Islam, Second Edition. Volume XI: W–Z. Leiden: E. J. Brill. p. 466. ISBN 978-90-04-12756-2.
- Walker, Paul E. (1998). "The Ismāʿīlī Daʿwa and the Fāṭimid Caliphate". In Petry, Carl F. (ed.). The Cambridge History of Egypt: Islamic Egypt, 640–1517. Vol. 1. Cambridge: Cambridge University Press. pp. 120–150. ISBN 0-521-47137-0.
