= Kutama =

Berber tribe in northern Algeria

The Kutama (Kabyle: Ikutamen; Arabic: كتامة, romanized: Kutāma) were a Berber tribe in northern Algeria classified among the Berber confederation of the Bavares. The Kutama are attested much earlier, in the form Koidamousii by the Greek geographer Ptolemy.

The Kutama played a pivotal role in establishing the Fatimid Caliphate (909–1171), forming the bulk of the Fatimid army which eventually overthrew the Aghlabids who controlled Ifriqiya, and which then went on to conquer Egypt, Sudan, Hijaz and the southern Levant in 969–975. The Kutama remained one of the mainstays of the Fatimid army until well into the 11th century.

== Ancient history ==
The Kutama are attested in the form Koidamousii, by the Greek geographer Ptolemy, whose African documentation seems to date from the years 100-110. They were then in the region of the Ampsaga river (oued el-Kebir) in Mauretania Caesariensis. He locates them upstream of the Khitouae tribe and downstream of the Todoukae tribe, themselves located near the sources of the river. In the second century, they formed part of the Bavares tribal confederation, which gave a hard time to the Roman power, both in Mauretania Caesarean, then Sitifian after 303, and in Numidia. This political and military opposition did not prevent a certain romanization, at least punctually, thus the creation of the milestone respublica Vahartanensium, probably linked to the need for a road crossing of the massif which is hardly attested until the reign of Hadrian.

== Ucutumani Kingdom ==
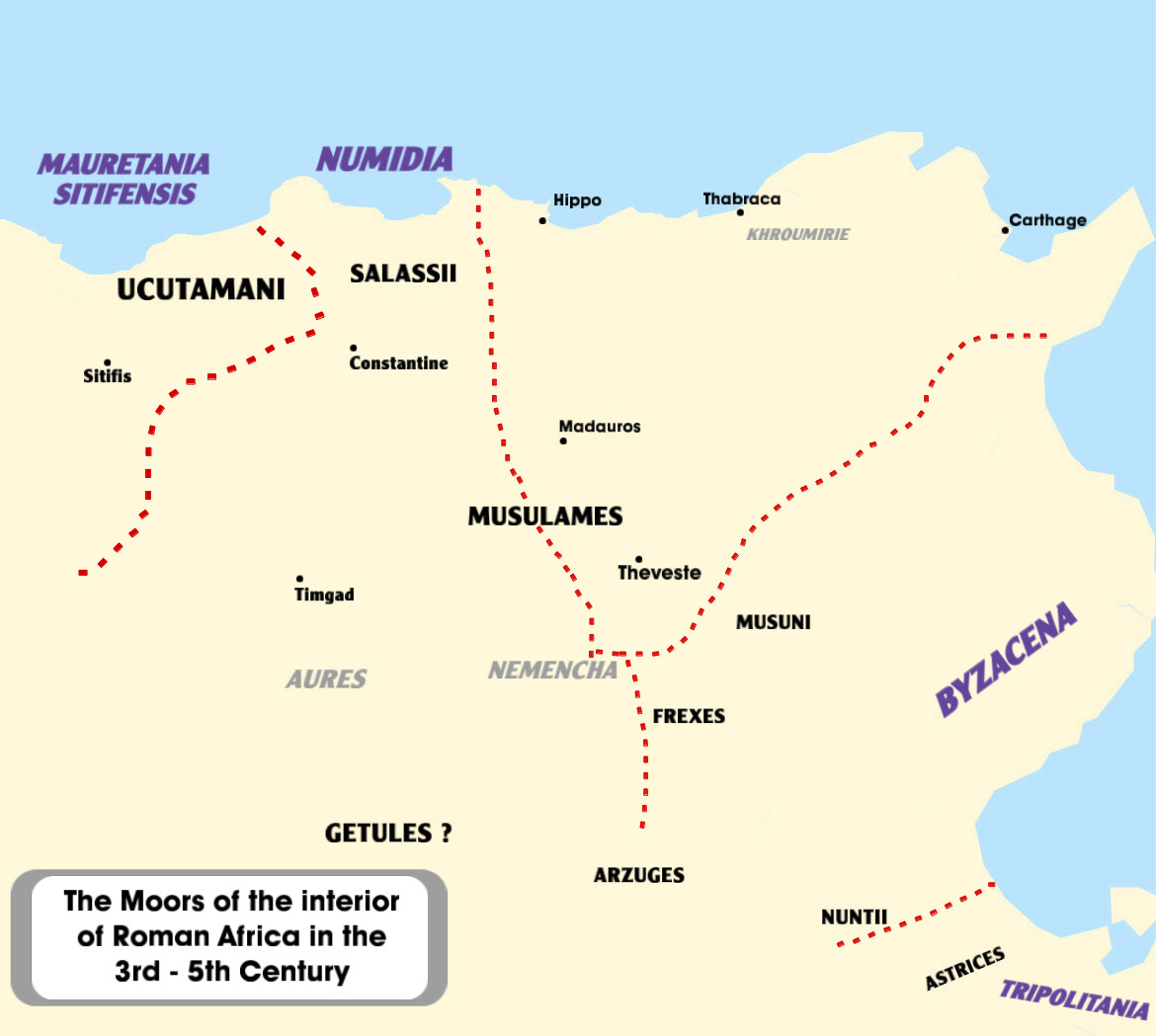
Map showing the Ucutumani among other tribes of the interior of Roman Africa in the third to fifth century

In 411, the Kutama town Ceramusa (or Ceramudensis Plebsis) is attested as the seat of a bishopric. The same episcopal seat was occupied by a certain Montanus of Cedamusa during the Vandal era. In the 6th century, during the Byzantine rule, the Kutama are attested by a Christian inscription, where a "king of the Ucutumani" (rex Ucutuma[niorum]) is said to be the "slave of God" (Dei servus). This inscription was discovered at the Fdoulès pass, south of Igilgili, at one of the last passes before the descent to Milevum. According to the archaeologist Gabriel Camps, the fact that this leader took the title "king" suggests that the Kutama were growing in importance and that their leader had begun to consolidate local authority.

== Post-classical history ==
=== Early Islamic history ===
The oldest accounts of the Muslim conquest of the Maghreb, Ibn Abd al-Hakam and Khalifah ibn Khayyat, do not speak of them, any more than al-Ya'qubi (d. 897) and Ibn al-Faqih (d. after 903). Their name appears for the first time among that of other Berber tribes in the al-Masālik of Ibn Khordadbeh (d. 885). The tribe was not very important at that time.

The Kutama probably had embraced Islam, first as Khawarij, a little before the middle of the 8th century. The fact remains that in 757-758 AD, during the capture of Kairouan by the Ibadis, Kutama were among the Kharidjite troops, allied with Abu al-Khattab al-Ma'afiri and Abd al-Rahman ibn Rustam. The latter, then governor of Kairouan, appointed one of their own, Uqayba, to head it.

=== Aghlabid era ===
Little is known about the Kutama for the rest of the eighth century, after the advent of the Aghlabids at Kairouan in 789. The Kutama contented themselves with ignoring the Aghlabid authorities and welcoming the rebel soldiers in their inaccessible mountains. Their large population and the isolation in their mountains caused them not to suffer any oppression on the part of this dynasty.

=== Fatimid era ===
==== Conversion to Isma'ilism ====
At the end of the 9th century, in Mecca in 893/4 some Kutama notables met the Isma'ili da'i Abu Abdallah al-Shi'i, who attracted them to Isma'ili Shi'ism, and accompanied them on their return. In Ikjan, their chief town, the da'i managed to win the sympathy of the population.

It was probably around this time that their geographic expansion began. The territory that the Kutama occupied from this time seems much more extensive than it was in Roman times; it then encompassed the northern mountain ranges that stretch from Bougie to around Constantine, which al-Bakri calls Jabal Kutama, "the mountains of the Kutama". This area, limited to the west by the country of Zouaoua (Kabylie of Djurdjura, Soummam valley and Bejaia region), extended south to Sétif, Mila, Constantine, Collo and Jijel. It was made up of Lesser Kabylia, the Collo Massif, part of the chain of Bibans, the mountains of Ferjioua, the numidic chain. This region has an extremely rugged terrain, with a steep coast, bordered by wooded mountains of very difficult access, the gaps being extremely rare, with mountains reaching almost 2000 m. The villages are perched on peaks and ridges that are difficult to access. The region presents itself as an almost impenetrable natural fortress. Later the Kutama were established further south in the plains. This extension suggests that, taking advantage of the weaknesses of the central government, the Kutama had reconstituted under their own name the old Bavares confederation and had extended to the south by reclaiming the fringe of the high plains bordering the southern flank of their mountains (Mila, Sétif regions, etc), an area favorable to the cultivation of the cereals of which their ancestors had been deprived in Roman times.

==== Conquest of the Aghlabid emirate ====
Map of the fall of the Aghlabid Emirate to the Kutama led by Abu Abdallah

Abu Abdallah formed a powerful army and launched his troops against the Aghlabid fortresses in Lesser Kabylia. A first attack failed: after occupying Mila in 902, the da'i was defeated by the son of the emir Ibrahim II, who however did not succeed in pursuing him until Ikjan. The Kutama were able to adapt and constitute a formidable militia. Under the orders of Abu Abdallah, they took Sétif in 904, Belezma in 905, then Béja, against superior armies in both number and armament. In 907/8 they attacked the core of Ifriqiya. After the capitulation of Meskiana and Tébessa, they captured Constantine. Abu Abdallah defeated the army of Ziyadat Allah III at al-Urbus (ancient Laribus); the Aghlabids, defeated on all sides, abandoned by their followers, fled to the East. The victors entered Kairouan, parading in Raqqada in March 909. The da'i proclaimed an amnesty, but distributed the spoils among his forces. Assured of the victory, he revealed the name of his master, Abdallah al-Mahdi Billah, and went to Sijilmasa, where he was held, to escort him to Kairouan. On the way, the Kutama army conquered the Rustamid imamate and drove the Ibadis from Tiaret, who went to take refuge in Sadrata, the capital of Ouargla oasis.

==== Rise to prominence under the early Fatimids ====
The Kutama were the mainstay and elite of the early Fatimid armies. Although other Berber tribes soon flocked to the Fatimid banner — notably the large Sanhaja confederation during the reign of al-Mansur bi-Nasr Allah — the Kutama continued to provide the bulk of the Fatimid armies until after the Fatimid conquest of Egypt in 969. Their role in the Fatimid state was so great that Ibn Khaldun counted the Fatimids among the Berber dynasties, and several historians trace the origin of the Fatimids to the Kutama Berbers of Kabylia and attribute to the Kutama Berbers the establishment of the Fatimid Caliphate after conquering Ifriqiya and installing Abdullāh al-Mahdī Billa as Caliph. According to the historian Heinz Halm, the early Fatimid state can be likened to a "hegemony of the Kutama", particularly of the four sub-tribes of Jimala, Lahisa, Malusa, and Ijjana. In 948, Caliph al-Mansur publicly remarked that God had granted them pre-eminence among all other peoples, since they had first seen and accepted the truth.

On the other hand, this dominion of the semi-civilized Kutama was greatly resented, not only by the other Berber tribes, but chiefly by the Arab and Arabicized inhabitants of the cities. As Halm writes, the situation was similar to a scenario where, "in the early eighteenth-century North America, the Iroquois, converted to Catholicism by Jesuit missionaries, had overrun the Puritan provinces of New England, installed their chieftains as governors in Boston, Providence and Hartford, and proclaimed a European with dubious credentials as King of England". Inevitably, the arrogance and exactions of the Kutama led to rebellions in the newly conquered Fatimid domains, in which the Kutama particularly were singled out and killed by the rebels.

==== Decline ====
After the move of the seat of the caliphate to Egypt in 973, a large number of Kutama accompanied the dynasty east. However, the forays into the Levant in the 970s revealed the inadequacies of an army based solely on the Kutama, and from 978, the Fatimids began incorporating ethnic groups, notably the Turks and Daylamites, from the eastern Islamic lands into their army. In combination with the increasing difficulty of renewing their pool of Kutama recruits after c. 987/88, these events challenged the position of the Kutama in the army. Thereafter, a fierce rivalry developed between the Kutama and the "Easterners" (Mashāriqa).

In 996, on the accession of al-Hakim bi-Amr Allah, the Kutama refused to acknowledge the new caliph unless the Kutama leader al-Hasan ibn Ammar was appointed as vizier. This was done, but Ibn Ammar's blatantly pro-Berber regime quickly alienated other members of the elite, and he was overthrown a year later. Finally, when al-Hakim assumed the reins of government in 1000, he launched a purge of the Fatimid elites, during which Ibn Ammar and many of the other prominent Kutama were executed.

Thereafter the position of the Kutama steadily declined, so that in November 1025, during an official review, the once numerous and proud Kutama were reduced to demanding bread to sate their hunger. Shortly after, they were unable to mobilize even 100 horsemen at short notice. On the other hand, the Persian traveller Nasir Khusraw mentions that there were 20,000 Kutama horsemen during his visit to Egypt in 1047.

During the chaos of the years 1062–1073, the Kutama allied themselves with the Sudān against the Turks and the Daylamites. The last remnants of the Kutama were dismissed from the Fatimid army after Badr al-Jamali came to power in 1073. In Algeria, the Kutama will give a subdivision: the Sedouikech tribes between the région of Béjaïa and Constantine.

== Sources ==
- Basset, René (1986). "Kutāma". In Bosworth, C. E.; van Donzel, E.; Lewis, B. & Pellat, Ch. (eds.). The Encyclopaedia of Islam, Second Edition. Volume V: Khe–Mahi. Leiden: E. J. Brill. p. 540. ISBN 978-90-04-07819-2.
- Beshir, B. (1978). "Fatimid Military Organization". Der Islam. 55 (1): 37–56. doi:10.1515/islm.1978.55.1.37. ISSN 0021-1818. S2CID 162316006.
- Camps, Gabriel (1999). "Essais de cargographie culturelle: À propos de la frontière de Numidie et de Maurétanie". Frontières et limites géographiques de l'Afrique du Nord antique. Histoire Ancienne et Médiévale (in French). Vol. 56. Paris: Publications de la Sorbonne. pp. 43–56.
- Daftary, Farhad (2007). The Ismāʿı̄lı̄s: Their History and Doctrines (Second ed.). Cambridge: Cambridge University Press. ISBN 978-0-521-61636-2.
- Desanges, J. (2008). "Koidamousii". In Chaker, Salem (ed.). Encyclopédie berbère. Vol. 28-29 | Kirtēsii – Lutte. Aix-en-Provence: Edisud. pp. 4269–4270. doi:10.4000/encyclopedieberbere.106. ISBN 9782744907074.
- Halm, Heinz (1991). Das Reich des Mahdi: Der Aufstieg der Fatimiden [The Empire of the Mahdi: The Rise of the Fatimids] (in German). Munich: C. H. Beck. ISBN 3-406-35497-1.
- Laporte, J.-P. (2005). "Ketama, Kutama". In Salem, Chaker (ed.). Encyclopédie berbère. Vol. 27 | Kairouan – Kifan Bel-Ghomari. Aix-en-Provence: Edisud. pp. 4179–4187. doi:10.4000/encyclopedieberbere.1346. ISBN 9782744905384.
- Lev, Yaacov (1987). "Army, Regime, and Society in Fatimid Egypt, 358–487/968–1094". International Journal of Middle East Studies. 19 (3): 337–365. doi:10.1017/s0020743800056762. JSTOR 163658. S2CID 162310414.
- Lewicki, T. (1988). El fasi, M.; Hrbek, Ivan (eds.). Africa from the Seventh to the Eleventh Century. UNESCO. ISBN 978-92-3-101709-4.
