= Ikjan =

Ikjan ⵉⴽⵊⴰⵏ (Berber) ايكجان (Arabic)
- Town
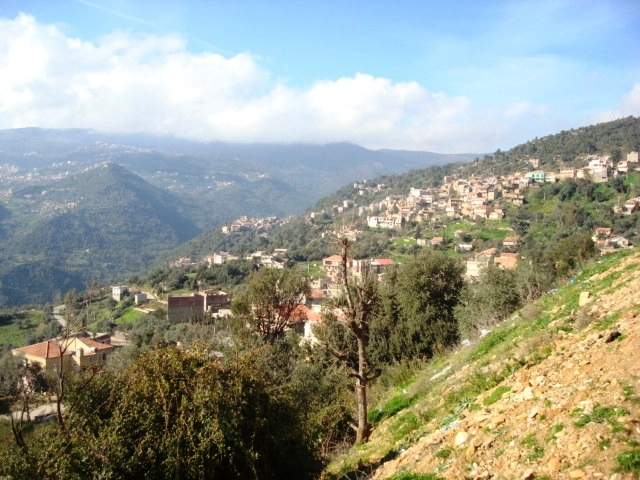
- The heights of Ikjan, located in the Lahdjar region of Beni Aziz, Algeria.

- Location within Algeria
- Coordinates: 36°28′12″N 5°39′25″E
- Country: Algeria
- Province: Sétif Province

Area
  - Total: 231 km^{2} (89 sq mi)
- Elevation: 983 m (3,225 ft)

Population
  - Total: 43,000

Ikjan (Arabic: ايكجان, Berber languages: ⵉⴽⵊⴰⵏ) is a former town near the present-day town of Beni Aziz in Algeria. Between 902 and 909 it served as the base and capital of the Kutama Berbers led by the dā'ī (missionary) Abu Abdallah al-Shi'i, who had founded an Isma'ili Shi'a state in the region on behalf of the Fatimid cause. This new movement rose in opposition to the Aghlabid dynasty, which ruled the region of Ifriqiya formally on behalf of the Abbasid Caliphs. The site of Ikjan was considered impregnable. In 909 Abu Abdallah and the Kutama armies finally overthrew the Aghlabids and set themselves up in Raqqada, laying the foundations for the Fatimid Caliphate, which was formally established with the enthronement of the first caliph, Abd Allah al-Mahdi, later that year.

== Geography ==
The region of Ikjan is located in eastern Algeria, occupies a central position at the administrative crossroads of three modern Algerian provinces. Geographically, it lies approximately 75 km west of Mila, 66 km northeast of Sétif the province to which it currently belongs and 89 km south of Jijel, the historical heartland of the Great Djimla clan. According to the administrative division established in 1984, it belongs to the Daïra of Beni Aziz. The region extends between longitudes 5° and 39' East, and between latitudes 36° and 28' North, covering a total area estimated at approximately 231 km. Its population exceeds 43,000 inhabitants. The city is situated on a plateau at an elevation of about 983 meters above sea level. National Road No. 7 passes nearby, granting it a strategic location that facilitates access and enhances its geographical importance.
