= Abu Abdallah al-Shi'i =

10th-century Iraqi Isma'ili missionary

Abu Abdallah al-Husayn ibn Ahmad ibn Muhammad ibn Zakariyya, better known as Abu Abdallah al-Shi'i (Arabic: ابو عبد الله الشيعي, romanized: Abū ʿAbd Allāh ash-Shīʿī), was an Isma'ili missionary (dāʿī) active in Yemen and North Africa. He was successful in converting and unifying a large part of the Kutama Berber tribe, leading them on the conquest of Ifriqiya from 902 to 909 and the overthrowing of the Aghlabid dynasty. This ultimately led to the establishment of the Fatimid Caliphate in Ifriqiya under the Imam–caliph Abdullah al-Mahdi Billah. However, Abdullah al-Mahdi Billah quickly fell out with Abu Abdallah and had Abu Abdallah executed on 18 February 911.

== Early life ==
Abu Abdallah al-Shi'i was born al-Husayn ibn Ahmad ibn Muhammad ibn Zakariyya in Kufa in Iraq. According to the sources, he may have been an early Sufi or Twelver Shi'a adherent before being proselytized along with his brother, Abu'l-Abbas Muhammad, in 891 to Isma'ili Shi'ism by a local missionary (da'i), Abu Ali, or, according to other sources, by Hamdan Qarmat, the leader of the Iraqi branch of the Isma'ili missionary network (da'wa). Abu Abdallah and Abu'l-Abbas became members of the Isma'ili missionary network (da'wa) themselves, inducted by Firuz, the representative of the hidden imam, and soon sent to missions abroad: Abu'l-Abbas to Egypt, and Abu Abdallah to Yemen. Abu Abdallah joined the Hajj caravan to Mecca, and joined the Yemeni pilgrims on their return to their homeland. He arrived there in April 892, and stayed and learned with the chief Isma'ili da'i, in Yemen, Ibn Hawshab, in preparation for going on to lead a mission to the Maghreb.

After less than a year, Ibn Hawshab sent Abu Abdallah again to Mecca, thence to go on to the Maghreb. Following usual practice, he was to be accompanied by another da'i, Abdallah ibn Abi'l-Malahif, but the latter was replaced by Ibrahim ibn Ishaq al-Zabidi. Ibrahim became Abu Abdallah's lieutenant, becoming known as "the lesser lord" (al-sayyid al-saghir) among Abu Abdallah's followers, and remained with him until the conquest of Ifriqiya in 909. At Mecca, Abu Abdallah came across a party of Kutama Berbers who were on the Hajj, to whom he presented himself as a native of Sana'a. According to later sources, after engaging them in discussion, he found out about the situation in their homeland, the feebleness of the Aghlabid government outside the core territories of Ifriqiya, and the Berbers' own military potential. Seeing an opportunity, he managed to convince them to invite him to come and teach them his doctrine. Modern scholars on the other hand cast some doubt on the story of an unplanned, chance encounter, instead emphasizing that the da'wa and Abu Abdallah himself chose their targets with intention: there are stories about previous Shi'a missionaries sent to the Maghreb, the Kutama party contained at least two who were Shi'a themselves, and thus amenable to the Isma'ili cause. Moreover, the Kutama, unlike most Berbers, were not followers of the Ibadi Kharijite imamate of Tahert; living on the margins of the settled Muslim society of Ifriqiya, they may have been only superficially Islamicized, retaining many pagan practices.

== Mission among the Kutama ==
Abu Abdallah accompanied the Kutama back to their homeland in Lesser Kabylia, arriving there in June 893. His brother, Abu'l-Abbas, remained in Egypt and provided the link to the headquarters of the da'wa in Salamiya. Abu Abdallah secured the protection of the Saktan clan and immediately began his missionary work, establishing a base in the scarcely populated area of Ikjan. The da'i made some powerful converts in the chieftains Abu Musa ibn Yunus al-Azayi, leader of the Masalta clan, and Abu Zaki Tammam ibn Mu'arik, nephew of the leader of the Ijjana. At the same time his teachings aroused opposition, not only from adherents of Kharijism who rejected his teachings, but also as the result of political rivalries: as some leaders of clans or tribes associated themselves with Abu Abdallah, their enemies came to oppose him. As a result, he soon had to move his base of operations from Ikjan to Tazrut.

Abu Abdallah modelled his activities on the example of Muhammad: Ikjan and Tazrut became an 'abode of refuge' (dar al-hijra), his followers were termed the 'friends' (awliya) or 'faithful' (mu'minun), a chosen people. Conversion and participation in the new community meant the shedding of previous practices and affiliations: under the new doctrine and its preacher, the adherents were forged into unity. Disregarding prior tribal or clan affiliations, Abu Abdallah divided his armed followers into seven parts (asba'), and appointed a commander (muqaddam) over each, while newly designated da'is were entrusted with the governance of the districts under their control. In accordance with Shi'a practice, a fifth (khums) of all booty was set aside for the messiah, the mahdi), when he should come into his kingdom. This grew to a substantial treasure, which served as an example of the da'i's own integrity—he never used it and entrusted its management to his officers—as well as a test of loyalty for his officers—those who embezzled it were rapidly purged.

== Fatimid conquest of Ifriqiya ==
Map of the fall of the Aghlabid Emirate to the Kutama led by Abu Abdallah

As long as they were confined to the mountains of Lesser Kabylia, Abu Abdallah's activities were ignored by the Aghlabid government at Raqqada. This complacency came to an end in late 902, Abu Abdallah attacked and captured the fortified town of Mila. The move was born both out of strength and weakness: while Abu Abdallah had consolidated control over most of the Kutama, those of their chiefs who remained opposed to him now turned to the Aghlabid government for support and military help against the da'i and his followers. The capture of Mila forced the Aghlabids to react, sending an army west to recover the city, under the prince Abu Abdallah al-Ahwal, a son of Emir Abdallah II. As most of the regular troops had followed the former emir Ibrahim II to Italy, the army was composed mostly of raw recruits; and its arrival so late in the year meant that while Abu Abdallah retreated to his mountain strongholds, the Aghlabid troops could not follow in the snow. The expedition was further condemned to failure as the result of Aghlabid dynastic disputes: in July 903, Emir Abdallah II was murdered by his son, Ziyadat Allah III, who then recalled and executed his brother Abu Abdallah al-Ahwal.

In 904, Abu Abdallah captured another major town, Setif. Emir Ziyadat Allah III obtained a juridical opinion lambasting the followers of "the man from Sana'a" as heretics, but his military response proved as ineffective as the last. An army under the prince Ibrahim al-Habashi was sent west but wintered at Constantine, before being joined by the forces of Shabib ibn Abi Shaddad, governor of the frontier province of Zab. Ibrahim al-Habashi led the combined Aghlabid army into the mountains in pursuit of the Kutama, but at Kayuna it was put to battle and destroyed by Abu Abdallah's men. The Aghlabid government immediately raised another army and stationed it at al-Urbus (Byzantine Laribus), barring the way to Kairouan and Raqqada. As the historian Michael Brett comments, "this was an army on the defensive"; as a result, Abu Abdallah ignored it, and moved instead against Tubna (ancient Tubunae), seat of Shabib ibn Abi Shaddad, administrative and military centre of the Aghlabid frontier, and last refuge of the renegade Kutama chieftains. Tubna was placed under siege for almost a year, before it capitulated on terms in October 906: the garrison was spared, but the renegade Kutama chieftain Fath ibn Yahya al-Masaliti was executed.

The triumph of the da'i was helped by the uprising of the Aghlabid army under Mudlij ibn Zakariyya in March 906. This military mutiny clearly showed that the Aghlabid state was disintegrating, and Abu Abdallah pressed his advantage. In the spring of 907, the Kutama sacked Billizma, a town that controlled the route from Tubna to Kairouan; unlike Tubna, its garrison was not spared. The Kutama then defeated an Aghlabid expedition sent against them from Baghaya, whereupon Baghaya and Tijis opened their gates, giving Abu Abdallah control of the passage from the central Maghreb to Tunisia.

The last remaining stronghold between the Kutama and Kairouan/Raqqada was now al-Urbus, where the last Aghlabid armies were assembled. Abu Abdallah spent 908 further south, at Kasserine and the Djerid, but in March 909 gathered his forces for the final assault. The da'i's army now swelled to enormous size, as many more tribes joined it; not quite willingly, as those who refused were massacred in retaliation. On 18 March 909, the Aghlabid army was overwhelmed, and the inhabitants of al-Urbus massacred. Ziyadat Allah III fled his capital for Egypt, taking many of his treasures with him, but leaving most of his extensive harem behind, and taking care to torch the offices of the land tax department and all fiscal records contained therein. Chaos broke out once this became known, as the palaces were ransacked for five days by the locals and any thought of further resistance vanished. Abu Abdallah sent a thousand horse under one of his commanders ahead to put an end to the looting, and followed towards Kairouan. There he was met by a delegation of notables that surrendered the city. On the next day, 25 March 909, Abu Abdallah entered Raqqada and took up residence in the palace of the emir.

== Regency and the rescue of al-Mahdi ==
In the meantime, the hidden Isma'ili imam and Abu Abdallah's true master, the future caliph al-Mahdi Billah, had left Salamiya to avoid Abbasid persecution. With a small entourage he made his way to Ramla and thence Egypt, where they were sheltered by Abu Abdallah's old mentor, Abu Ali, for a year in 904–905. In view of Abu Abdallah's successes, al-Mahdi decided to next move west towards Ifriqiya, and joined a merchant caravan going west, accompanied by Abu'l-Abbas Muhammad. On the way, the caravan was attacked by Berber tribes, which left Abu'l-Abbas Muhammad wounded. At Tripoli, Abu'l-Abbas Muhammad was sent ahead to Kairouan, the Aghlabid capital, to reconnoitre. Unbeknownst to him, news of al-Mahdi and his identity as one sought by the Abbasid government had already reached the city, and he was immediately arrested. He remained in prison until spring of 906, when he was able to escape and left for Tripoli. Informed of Abu'l-Abbas' fate, al-Mahdi changed his plans: instead of crossing the Aghlabid domains and making for the country of the Kutama, he joined another caravan heading west, skirting the southern fringes of Aghlabid territory. He was accompanied only by his son, the future al-Qa'im, and a household slave. Pressuring and even bribing the caravan leader to make haste, in late 905 they arrived in Sijilmasa, an oasis town in eastern Morocco, ruled by the Midrarid dynasty and a centre of the trans-Sahara trade. Already before the conquest of the Aghabid emirate was complete, Abu Abdallah sent a troop of Kutama to escort his master to Ifriqiya, but they were waylaid by the Ibadi emir of Tahert and had to turn back.

With his master was still in faraway Sijilmasa, it was up to Abu Abdallah to establish the new Shi'a regime in Ifriqiya. He issued a letter of pardon (aman) to the citizens of Kairouan and all former servants of the Aghlabid regime, took stock of the contents of the palaces, installed governors, and ordered changes to the coinage, calls to prayer and the sermon, and official seals to reflect the new regime. The new ruler was not yet named in public; instead, the new formulas used Quranic verses or paraphrases that exalted the Family of Muhammad, the fulfillment of God's promise, the victory of God's truth (haqq), and of the proof (hujja) of God. Abu'l-Abbas Muhammad, who had escaped from prison and emerged from hiding after his brother's victory, began to spread the Isma'ili doctrine, holding disputations with the local Sunni jurists in the Great Mosque of Kairouan. Abu Abdallah also chose a new chief qadi (judge), in the person of the local Shi'ite Muhammad ibn Umar al-Marwarrudhi.

As soon as his rule was stable enough, on 6 June 909, Abu Aballah set out from Raqqada at the head of a large army, to find his master and hand over power to him. In his stead at Raqqada, he left Abu Zaki Tammam ibn Mu'arik, with his brother Abu'l-Abbas Muhammad as his aide. Abu Zaki was named as regent because of his influence with the Kutama, since Abu'l-Abbas lacked his brother's authority over the Berbers; but it was made clear that in reality, especially concerning religious affairs, Abu'l-Abbas' opinion was to be decisive. On the way to Sijilmasa, Abu Abdallah received the submission of Muhammad ibn Khazar, leader of the nomadic Zenata Berbers, and overthrew the Rustamid Ibadi imamate at Tahert, installing a Kutama governor there. Learning of the approach of the Kutama army, the emir of Sijilmasa had al-Mahdi questioned and put under house arrest along with his son, but otherwise treated well. On 26 August 909, the Kutama army reached Sijilmasa, and demanded the release of their captive imam. After brief clashes with the Midrarid troops, Emir al-Yasa fled his city, which was occupied and plundered. Mounted on horseback and dressed in fine clothes, al-Mahdi and al-Qa'im were presented to the army, amidst shouts and tears of religious exaltation. On the next day, 27 August, al-Mahdi was enthroned and acclaimed by the troops. As the historian Michael Brett explains, the occasion had double meaning: on the one hand, it acknowledged al-Mahdi's caliphate, but on the other, it confirmed the Kutama soldiery in their exceptional status as 'faithful' (mu'minun) or 'friends of God' (awliya), an elite distinct from the mass of ordinary Muslims.

== Downfall and death ==
The prophetic traditions about the mahdi, while diffuse, had insisted that his coming would be heralded by celestial signs and portents, that he would be a young man of exceptional beauty, and that he would rapidly and miraculously lead his armies to victory. By comparison, the reality of al-Mahdi as a man and ruler was disappointing: a 35-year old former merchant accustomed to an easy life, wine, and rich clothing, whose luxurious lifestyle clashed with the austere doctrines propagated by Abu Abdallah and hitherto followed by the Kutama. Even Abu Abdallah criticized his master, accusing him of corrupting the Kutama with power, money and luxury and gifts. Abu Abdallah had never met his master before going to Sijilmasa, and was obviously unaware of his character or intentions; and now he may have felt, in the words of the historian Michael Brett, "as if his own movement had been taken over by one completely different".

An immediate conflict was averted as Abu Abdallah was called to lead an army east in July 910. During the previous months, Sijilmasa had been lost to the Midrarids, Tahert was once more closely besieged by the Zenata, and an uprising broke out among the Kutama, led by a certain Baban. The latter was quickly subdued by loyalist Kutama, and Abu Abdallah managed to defeat the Zenata near Tubna, relieving Tahert and even reaching the Mediterranean coast at Ténès. He then campaigned against the Zenata and Sadina tribes in modern central Algeria, before returning to Raqqada in the winter of 910/11.

At Ténès, however, a conspiracy had begun among the Kutama chieftains: led by Abu Abdallah, they decided to confront al-Mahdi and put his claims to the test. The sources differ on the details, but the Kutama confronted al-Mahdi in a public audience, demanding that he perform a miracle. Abu Abdallah, his brother Abu'l-Abbas Muhammad, Abu Zaki, and the 'supreme shaykh' Abu Musa Harun openly accused him of being a fraud and an impostor. When Abu Musa Harun was murdered shortly after, the other conspirators decided to assassinate al-Mahdi. Possibly due to the doubts of Abu Abdallah, or because they could not agree on his successor, they delayed their action. Informed of their intentions by the Kutama commander Ghazwiya, al-Mahdi moved first. Commanders whose loyalty was suspect were sent to missions away from the capital, and replaced by loyal ones, so that on 18 February 911, Abu Abdallah and Abu'l-Abbas Muhammad were assassinated by loyal Kutama soldiers in the caliph's own palace. News of the death of Abu Abdallah al-Shi'i spread quickly. Al-Mahdi hesitated for two days, but then executed the remaining Kutama leaders involved in the conspiracy. Given his vital role in the establishment of the Fatimid Caliphate, Abu Abdallah was given a formal funeral, with al-Mahdi attending; and the pro-Fatimid sources are at pains to portray his death as a "regrettable fall from grace of a hitherto loyal servant whose faith was finally overcome by ambition", for which the blame is placed on Abu'l-Abbas and the Kutama chieftains, above all Abu Zaki; Abu Zaki's and Abu'l-Abbas spell of power as regents during Abu Abdallah's absence are said to have corrupted them and led them to challenge their rightful master.

== Sources ==
- Brett, Michael (2001). The Rise of the Fatimids: The World of the Mediterranean and the Middle East in the Fourth Century of the Hijra, Tenth Century CE. The Medieval Mediterranean. Vol. 30. Leiden: Brill. ISBN 90-04-11741-5.
- Brett, Michael (2017). The Fatimid Empire. The Edinburgh History of the Islamic Empires. Edinburgh: Edinburgh University Press. ISBN 978-0-7486-4076-8.
- Daftary, Farhad (2007). The Ismāʿı̄lı̄s: Their History and Doctrines (Second ed.). Cambridge: Cambridge University Press. ISBN 978-0-521-61636-2.
- García-Arenal, Mercedes (2006). Messianism and Puritanical Reform: Mahdīs of the Muslim West. Translated by Martin Beagles. Leiden and Boston: Brill. ISBN 978-90-04-15051-5.
- Halm, Heinz (1991). Das Reich des Mahdi: Der Aufstieg der Fatimiden [The Empire of the Mahdi: The Rise of the Fatimids] (in German). Munich: C. H. Beck. ISBN 3-406-35497-1.
- Walker, Paul E. (2008). "Abū ʿAbdallāh al-Shīʿī". In Fleet, Kate; Krämer, Gudrun; Matringe, Denis; Nawas, John; Rowson, Everett (eds.). Encyclopaedia of Islam (3rd ed.). Brill Online. doi:10.1163/1573-3912_ei3_SIM_0282. ISSN 1873-9830.
