= Baghai =

Baghai بغاي
- Commune and town

- Location within Algeria
- Coordinates: 35°31′19″N 7°06′52″E
- Country: Algeria
- Province: Khenchela Province

Population (2008)
  - Total: 6,676
- Time zone: UTC+1 (CET)

Baghai is a town and commune in Khenchela Province, Algeria. It is located at 35°30'59.99"N 7°06'60.00" E. According to the 1998 census it has a population of 6,414.

== Geography ==
Baghai is located between the Aurès mountains in the south and the Garaat al-Tarf salt lake in the north. El Hamma, Khenchela is 4½ km away and 7 km to the south is Khenchela, capital of Khenchela Province.

== History ==
In antiquity Baghai was known as Bagai, and was a city of Roman North Africa.
