= Ibn Hawshab =

Iraqi Isma'ili missionary (died 914)

Abu'l-Qāsim al-Ḥasan ibn Faraj ibn Ḥawshab ibn Zādān al-Najjār al-Kūfī (Arabic: أبو القاسم الحسن ابن فرج بن حوشب زاذان النجار الكوفي; died 31 December 914), better known simply as Ibn Ḥawshab, or by his honorific of Manṣūr al-Yaman (Arabic: منصور اليمن, lit. 'Conqueror of Yemen'), was a senior Isma'ili missionary (dāʿī) from the environs of Kufa. In cooperation with Ali ibn al-Fadl al-Jayshani, he established the Isma'ili creed in Yemen and conquered much of that country in the 890s and 900s in the name of the Isma'ili imam, Abdallah al-Mahdi, who at the time was still in hiding. After al-Mahdi proclaimed himself publicly in Ifriqiya in 909 and established the Fatimid Caliphate, Ibn al-Fadl turned against him and forced Ibn Hawshab to a subordinate position. Ibn Hawshab's life is known from an autobiography he wrote, while later Isma'ili tradition ascribes two theological treatises to him.

== Origin and conversion to Isma'ilism ==
Ibn Hawshab was born at a village near the Nahr Nars canal, in the environs of Kufa in southern Iraq. His origin is unknown, although later Isma'ili tradition held that he was a descendant of Muslim ibn Aqil ibn Abi Talib (a nephew of Ali ibn Abi Talib).

Sources differ on his profession, portraying him as a linen weaver or a carpenter. He hailed from a family that were adherents of Twelver Shi'ism. According to his own report, he had been experiencing a crisis of faith after the death of the eleventh imam, Hasan al-Askari, in 874, apparently without male progeny. Eventually, the Twelvers came to believe in an infant son of al-Askari as the twelfth and hidden imam (whence the name "Twelvers"), who would one day return as the mahdī, the messianic figure of Islamic eschatology, who according to legend would overthrow the usurping Abbasid caliphs and destroy their capital Baghdad, restore the unity of the Muslims, conquer Constantinople, ensure the final triumph of Islam and establish a reign of peace and justice. However, that belief was not yet firmly established during the early years after Hasan al-Askari's death. Like Ibn Hawshab, many Shi'ites had doubts about the claims made about the twelfth imam, and were further demoralized by the political impotence and quietism of the Twelver leadership. In this climate, the millennialism of the Isma'ilis, who preached the imminent return of a mahdī, and the start of a new messianic era of justice and the revelation of the true religion, was very attractive to dissatisfied Twelvers.

According to his own account, Ibn Hawshab was converted to the rival Isma'ili branch of Shi'ism by an old man who came to him while he was studying the Quran at the bank of the Euphrates. Pro-Fatimid accounts hold that the agent (dāʿī) in question was Firuz, who was chief dāʿī at the movement's headquarters at Salamiya and the chief proxy (bāb, "gate") for the hidden Isma'ili imam, whereas the anti-Fatimid Qarmatian tradition holds that this was Ibn Abi'l-Fawaris, a lieutenant of Abdan, the chief dāʿī of Iraq.

Shortly after, Ibn Hawshab claims that he met the Isma'ili imam, then secretly living at Salamiya. After his training was complete, he was tasked with spreading the Isma'ili creed to Yemen. He was joined by a recently converted native Yemeni, Ali ibn al-Fadl al-Jayshani, and set off in late May or early June 881.

== Mission to Yemen ==
Main towns in Yemen in the 9th century

The two missionaries made for Kufa, where they joined the pilgrim caravans, whose multitudes, gathered from all corners of the Islamic world, allowed them to travel with anonymity. After completing the rituals of the pilgrimage at Mecca, the two men arrived in northern Yemen in August 881. The Yemen was at the time a troubled province of the Abbasid empire. Caliphal authority had traditionally been weak and mostly limited to the capital, Sana'a, while in the rest of the country tribal conflicts, sometimes dating to pre-Islamic times, persisted. At the time of Ibn Hawshab and Ibn al-Fadl's arrival, the country was politically fragmented and only loosely under Abbasid suzerainty. Much of the interior was held by the Yu'firid dynasty, who as Sunnis recognized the Abbasids. After capturing Sana'a in 861, their rule extended from Sa'ada in the north to al-Janad (northeast of Taiz) in the south and Hadramawt in the east. A rival dynasty, the Ziyadids, also nominally loyal to the Abbasids, held Zabid on the western coastal plain, and at times exercised significant control over wide portions of the country. The Manakhi family ruled the southern highlands around Taiz, while the northern parts of the country were in practice dominated by warring tribes owing allegiance to no-one. The lack of political unity, the remoteness of the province and its inaccessible terrain, along with deep-rooted Shi'a sympathies in the local population, made Yemen "manifestly fertile territory for any charismatic leader equipped with tenacity and political acumen to realise his ambitions".

After travelling through Sana'a and al-Janad, Ibn Hawshab stayed for a while in Aden, where he passed himself off as a cotton merchant. Ibn Hawshab was evidently the senior of the two, but at some point, Ali ibn al-Fadl left him, moving to his home town of Jayshan (near modern Qa'tabah), where he independently began his mission in the mountains of Jebel Yafi'i. Ibn Hawshab does not appear to have had much success in gaining converts in Aden. When he met some pro-Shi'a members of the northern Banu Musa clan, who were open to his teachings and invited him to join them in their homeland, he left Aden and settled in the village of Adan La'a, west of Sana'a. There Ibn Hawshab settled in the house of a Shi'a partisan who had died in the Yu'firid dungeons, married his orphaned daughter, and in 883/4 began his public mission (daʿwa), proclaiming the imminent appearance of the mahdī.

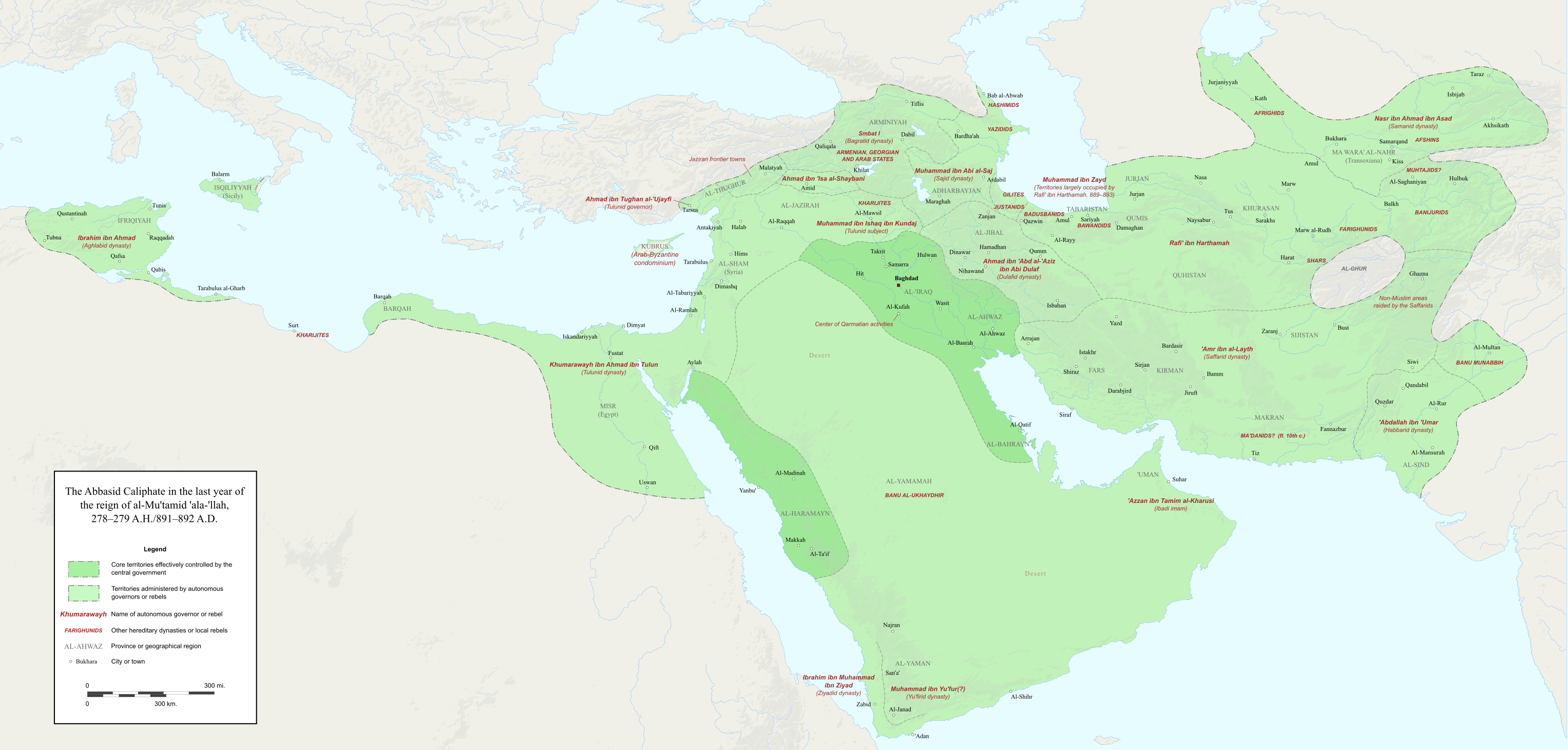
Map of the fragmented Abbasid empire c. 892, with areas still under direct control of the Abbasid central government in dark green, and under autonomous rulers adhering to nominal Abbasid suzerainty in light green

As in other areas of the Islamic world, this call soon attracted many followers. The widespread millennialist expectations of the period coincided with a deep crisis of the Abbasid Caliphate (the Anarchy at Samarra, followed by the Zanj Rebellion), and with dissatisfaction among many Twelver adherents, to enhance the appeal of the revolutionary Isma'ili message. Ibn Hawshab quickly made many converts, with his wife's family foremost among them: one of her cousins, al-Haytham, was sent as a dāʿī to Sindh, thus beginning a long history of Isma'ili presence in the Indian subcontinent. Furthermore, Abdallah ibn al-Abbas al-Shawiri was sent to Egypt; Abu Zakariyya al-Tamami to Bahrayn; and others to Yamama and parts of India (most probably Gujarat). Most consequential among the dāʿīs trained and sent by Ibn Hawshab was Abu Abdallah al-Shi'i, a native of Sana'a. On Ibn Hawshab's instructions, in 893 he left for the Maghreb, where he began proselytizing among the Kutama Berbers. His mission was extremely successful. Backed by the Kutama, in 903 he was able to rise in revolt against the Aghlabid emirs of Ifriqiya, culminating in their overthrow and the establishment of the Fatimid Caliphate in 909.

By 885, the Isma'ili daʿwa was strong enough for Ibn Hawshab to request, and receive, permission from Salamiya to raise troops and openly engage in a military contest for power. In 885/6, after repelling an attack by local Yu'firid troops, Ibn Hawshab and his followers erected a fortified stronghold at Abr Muharram at the feet of the Jabal Maswar (or Miswar) mountains, northwest of Sana'a. 500 men are said to have worked to build the fort in seven days, and Ibn Hawshab and the fifty most prominent of his followers took up residence there. A few days later he led his followers to settle the Jabal al-Jumayma mountain.

From this base, his forces took Bayt Fa'iz at Jabal Tukhla. This was a fortress dominating the Maswar massif, which fell when Ibn Hawshab managed to suborn part of the garrison. The fortress of Bayt Rayb, located about a kilometre away and protected by sheer cliffs on all sides, was captured on the third attempt. It soon became the residence and main stronghold of Ibn Hawshab, who termed it dār al-hijra, lit. 'place of refuge'. The term deliberately echoed the exile of Muhammad and his first followers from Mecca to seek protection in Medina; by implication, those who joined Ibn Hawshab were thus held to leave the corrupt world behind them to recreate a purer faith, emulating the first Muslims.

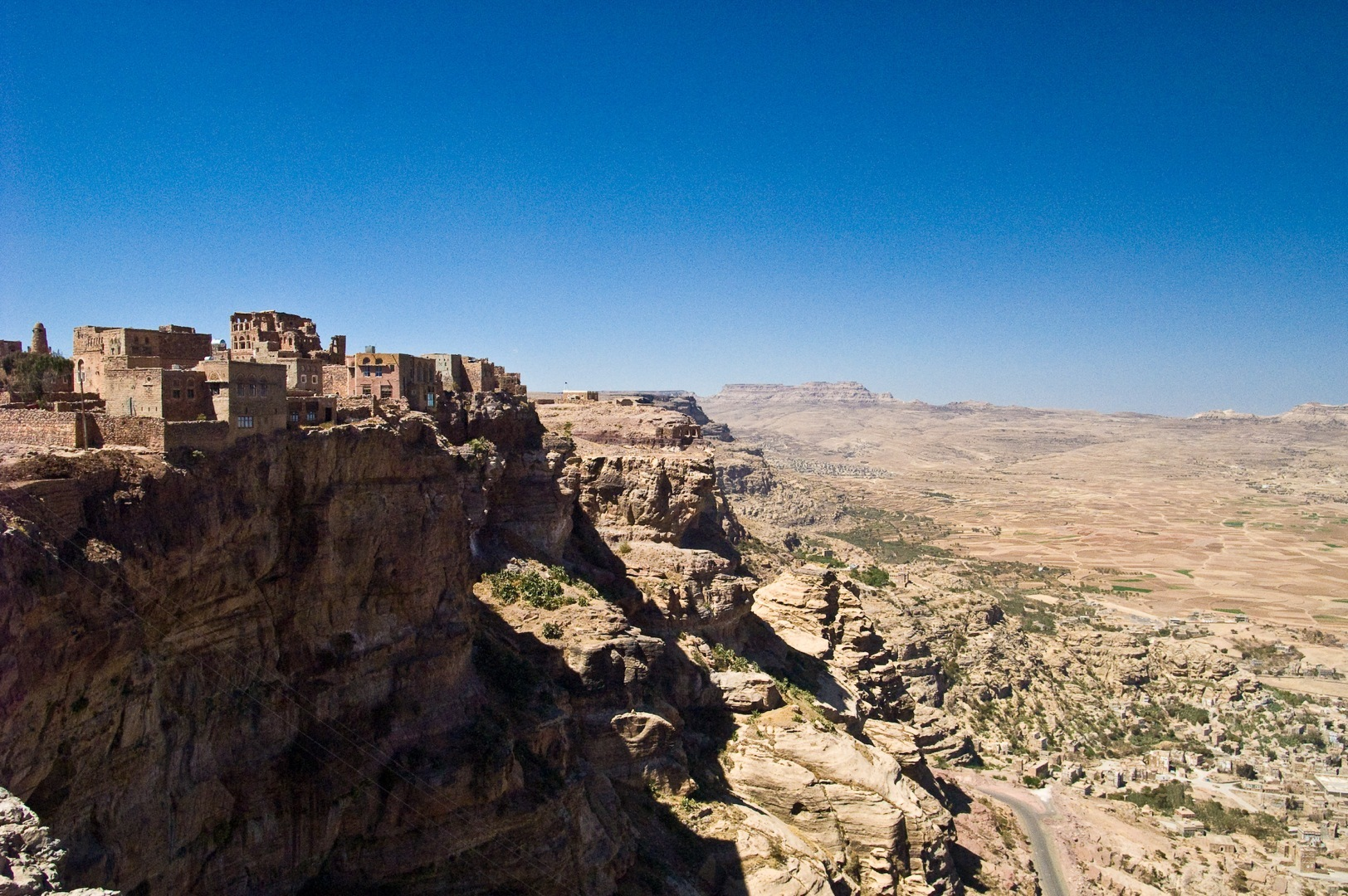
Photo of Shibam (Kawkaban) today

These three inaccessible fortresses provided a core territory from which Ibn Hawshab then began to extend his control over nearby valleys and mountains. After capturing the Jabal Tays mountain, he appointed the dāʿī Abu'l-Malahim as governor. The localities of Bilad Shawir, Ayyan, and Humlan were also captured. Ibn Hawshab's first attack on the Yu'firid capital Shibam failed, but he was soon able to capture it thanks to treason inside the walls, only to be forced to abandon it after a month. The exact dates of these operations are unknown, other than a general terminus ante quem of 903, but by 892/3 his position was firmly established, eventually earning him the honorific epithet (laqab) of Manṣūr al-Yaman ('the Conqueror of Yemen') or simply al-Manṣūr.

== Expansion and clash with Ibn al-Fadl ==
In the meantime, Ibn Hawshab's fellow missionary, Ali ibn al-Fadl, had secured the support of the local ruler of al-Mudhaykhira. With his help, he expanded his control over the highlands north of Aden. At the same time, in 897, another Shi'a leader entered Yemen: al-Hadi ila'l-Haqq Yahya, a representative of the rival Zaydi sect, who established a state based in Sa'ada, with himself as imam.

In the original Isma'ili doctrine, the expected mahdī was Muhammad ibn Isma'il. However, in 899, the Isma'ili daʿwa was split when the Qarmatians renounced the movement's secret leadership in Salamiya, when the future founder of the Fatimid Caliphate, Abdallah al-Mahdi, dropped the notion of the return of Muhammad ibn Isma'il and proclaimed himself as the mahdī. Both Ibn Hawshab and Ibn al-Fadl remained loyal to al-Mahdi. Abdallah al-Mahdi was soon forced to flee Salamiya, and in 905, he deliberated between moving on to Yemen or the Maghreb, both of which hosted successful Isma'ili missions. In view of later events, Wilferd Madelung suggests that doubts about Ibn al-Fadl's loyalty may have played a role in his eventual decision to choose the Maghreb.

On 25 January 905, Ibn al-Fadl evicted his erstwhile ally from al-Mudhaykhira. The two Isma'ili leaders now exploited the country's political division to expand their domains: in November 905, Ibn al-Fadl captured Sana'a, which allowed Ibn Hawshab to in turn seize Shibam. With the exception of Zaydi-held Sa'ada in the north, Ziyadid-ruled Zabid on the western coast, and Aden in the south, all of Yemen was now under Isma'ili control. In late 905, for the first time after coming to Yemen 25 years earlier, the two men met at Shibam. Madelung writes that the meeting "was evidently uneasy", as Ibn Hawshab warned Ibn al-Fadl against overextending his forces, which the latter disregarded. Of the two, Ibn al-Fadl was the most active in the following years, campaigning across the country against those who still opposed the daʿwa; but when he raided al-Bayad, Ibn Hawshab had to support him.

Both Sana'a and Shibam were briefly lost to the Zaydi imam al-Hadi in 906, but Shibam was recovered before the end of the year, and Sana'a in April 907. In June/July 910, after the Zaydis once again occupied Sana'a and then withdrew, Ibn Hawshab's men briefly occupied the city, but could not hold it due to their small number. Instead, the city fell to the Yu'firid As'ad ibn Ibrahim, before being taken again by Ibn al-Fadl in August 911.

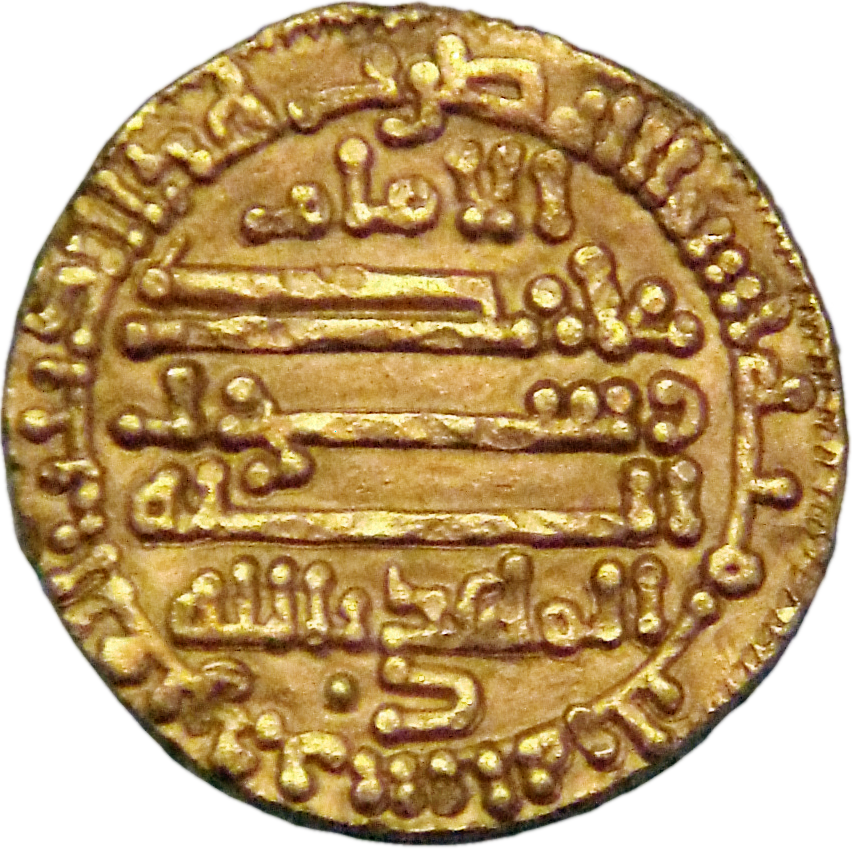
Gold dinar of Caliph al-Mahdi, minted at Kairouan in 912

At this point, Ibn al-Fadl publicly renounced allegiance to Abdallah al-Mahdi, (Note: The exact reason for Ibn al-Fadl's denunciation is not known; it may have been personal ambition, following his many successes, or disillusionment with al-Mahdi, especially following his sending of a clearly forged genealogy to the Yemeni Isma'ili community, and his claim that while indeed being the mahdī, his coming was not to usher in the end days as commonly assumed, but merely renew Islam and restore the true line of imams to their rightful place. Michael Brett suggests that the story of the joint mission of Ibn Hawshab and Ibn al-Fadl may have been an invention, although he emphasizes that the doctrinal issues at stake are obscure. Farhad Daftary labels Ibn al-Fadl as a 'Qarmatian', denoting his opposition to al-Mahdi's claims, much like the original Qarmatians in 899.) who had revealed himself following the successes of Abu Abdallah al-Shi'i and the establishment of the Fatimid Caliphate in 909. Indeed, now Ibn al-Fadl declared himself to be the awaited mahdī.

When Ibn Hawshab rebuffed his colleague's demands to join him and criticized his actions, Ibn al-Fadl marched against Ibn Hawshab. Shibam and Jabal Dhukhar were captured, and after a few battles, Ibn Hawshab was blockaded in the Jabal Maswar. After eight months of siege, in April 912, Ibn Hawshab sought terms, and handed over his son Ja'far as a hostage. Ja'far was returned after a year with a golden necklace as a gift.

== Death and aftermath ==
Ibn Hawshab died on 31 December 914, followed in October 915 by Ibn al-Fadl. Both men were succeeded by their sons, but their power rapidly declined, and Ibn al-Fadl's domain was soon destroyed by the Yu'firids. For over a century, until the rise of the Sulayhid dynasty, Isma'ilism remained mostly underground movement in Yemen, with few political patrons. Ibn Hawshab's three sons were ousted from the leadership by the daʿī Shawiri, and one of them, Ja'far, fled to the Fatimid court in Ifriqiya, carrying his father's works with him and becoming himself a significant author of the early Fatimid period. Nevertheless, the northern Yemeni community founded by Ibn Hawshab survived, and has provided the nucleus for the continued existence of Isma'ilism in Yemen to the present day.

== Writings ==
Ibn Hawshab's life is known in detail through a quasi-hagiographic Life (Sīra), written either by himself or by his son, Ja'far. It is now lost, but known through extensive quotations in later authors, and is, according to the historian Heinz Halm, "one of the most important sources for the history of the daʿwa".

Later Isma'ili tradition ascribed to him two of the earliest known Isma'ili theological treatises. The first of these, the Book of Righteousness and True Guidance (Kitāb al-Rushd wa’l-hidāya), survives only in fragments, which were published (including an English translation) by Wladimir Ivanow. The work is an exegesis of the Quran, and is one of the earliest surviving Isma'ili works, as it still mentions Muhammad ibn Isma'il as the awaited mahdī. The second, the Book of the Sage and Disciple (Kitāb al-ʿĀlim wa’l-ghulām), is more usually ascribed to his son, Ja'far. It consists of a series of encounters between a novice and his spiritual guide (the dāʿī), who gradually reveals the hidden, esoteric knowledge (bāṭin) to his disciple. The authenticity of both attributions is uncertain. The 12th-century Yemeni dāʿī Ibrahim al-Hamidi furthermore quotes in his work an epistle (risāla) attributed to Ibn Hawshab.

== Legacy ==
In 1961 AD (1381 AH), the 51st Dai al-Mutlaq, Syedna Taher Safiuddin, bestowed the prestigious title (laqab) of Mansoor-ul-Yaman upon his son and successor, the 52nd Dai al-Mutlaq, Syedna Mohammed Burhanuddin. This investiture followed a historic journey to Yemen, marking the first visit by a Dai al-Mutlaq to the region in approximately 340 Hijri-Misri years. Previously, the seat of the Dawat had resided in Yemen under Syedna Ali Shamsuddin IV bin Maulaya Hasan, whose demise in 1634 AD (1042 AH) precipitated the permanent relocation of the administrative seat to India again. Notably, this conferral occurred approximately 1,100 years after Ibn Hawshab was originally granted the identical title.

== See also ==
- Islamic history of Yemen
- Shia Islam in Yemen

== Sources ==
- Brett, Michael (2001). The Rise of the Fatimids: The World of the Mediterranean and the Middle East in the Fourth Century of the Hijra, Tenth Century CE. The Medieval Mediterranean. Vol. 30. Leiden: BRILL. ISBN 9004117415.
- Brett, Michael (2017). The Fatimid Empire. The Edinburgh History of the Islamic Empires. Edinburgh: Edinburgh University Press. ISBN 978-0-7486-4076-8.
- Daftary, Farhad (2004). Ismaili Literature: A Bibliography of Sources and Studies. London and New York: I.B. Tauris. ISBN 978-0-8577-1386-5.
- Daftary, Farhad (2007). The Ismāʿı̄lı̄s: Their History and Doctrines (Second ed.). Cambridge: Cambridge University Press. ISBN 978-0-521-61636-2.
- Eagle, A. B. D. R. (1994). "Al-Hādī Yahyā b. al-Husayn b. al-Qāsim (245–98/859–911): A Biographical Introduction and the Background and Significance of his Imamate". New Arabian Studies. 2: 103–122. ISSN 1351-4709.
- Haji, Hamid (2008). "JAʿFAR B. MANṢUR-AL-YAMAN". In Yarshater, Ehsan (ed.). Encyclopædia Iranica. Vol. XIV: Isfahan IX–Jobbāʾi. London and New York: Routledge & Kegan Paul. p. 349. ISBN 978-1-934283-08-0.
- Halm, Heinz (1991). Das Reich des Mahdi: Der Aufstieg der Fatimiden [The Empire of the Mahdi: The Rise of the Fatimids] (in German). Munich: C. H. Beck. ISBN 978-3-406-35497-7.
- Halm, Heinz (1998). "EBN ḤAWŠAB, ABU'L-QĀSEM ḤASAN". In Yarshater, Ehsan (ed.). Encyclopædia Iranica. Vol. VIII: Ebn ʿAyyāš–Eʿteżād-al-Salṭana. London and New York: Routledge & Kegan Paul. pp. 28–29. ISBN 978-1-56859-058-5.
- Landau-Tasseron, Ella (2010). "Arabia". In Robinson, Chase F. (ed.). The New Cambridge History of Islam, Volume 1: The Formation of the Islamic World, Sixth to Eleventh Centuries. Cambridge: Cambridge University Press. pp. 397–447. ISBN 978-0-521-83823-8.
- Madelung, Wilferd (1991). "Manṣūr al-Yaman". In Bosworth, C. E.; van Donzel, E. & Pellat, Ch. (eds.). The Encyclopaedia of Islam, Second Edition. Volume VI: Mahk–Mid. Leiden: E. J. Brill. pp. 438–439. ISBN 978-90-04-08112-3.
