= Ali ibn al-Fadl al-Jayshani =

Yemeni Isma'ili missionary (died 915)

ʿAlī ibn al-Faḍl al-Jayshānī (Arabic: علي بن الفضل الجيشاني; died 28 October 915) was a senior Isma'ili missionary (dāʿī) from Yemen. In cooperation with Ibn Hawshab, he established the Isma'ili creed in his home country and conquered much of it in the 890s and 900s in the name of the hidden Isma'ili imam, Abdallah al-Mahdi Billah. After the establishment of the Fatimid Caliphate in Ifriqiya in 909, and the public proclamation of al-Mahdi Billah as caliph, Ibn al-Fadl denounced al-Mahdi as false, and instead declared himself to be the awaited messiah (mahdī). His erstwhile colleague, Ibn Hawshab, refused to follow him, so Ibn al-Fadl turned against him and forced him to capitulate. Ibn al-Fadl's dominion collapsed swiftly after his death in October 915. In January 917, his stronghold of Mudhaykhira was seized by the Yu'firids, his children captured, and his two sons executed.

== Origin ==
Ali ibn al-Fadl was born in the village of Suhayb, near the town of Jayshan (today ruined, near modern Qa'tabah), in southern Yemen. A member of the Sabaean tribe, he was a Shi'ite. With others of his tribe, he went on the pilgrimage to Mecca in 880, and then continued north to visit the Shi'a shrine of Karbala in Iraq. It was there that his fervent devotion before al-Husayn's tomb was remarked upon by an Isma'ili agent (dāʿī), leading to his recruitment to the Isma'ili cause.

At the time, the dominant strain of Twelver Shi'ism was in a crisis. The disappearance of their eleventh imam, Hasan al-Askari, in 874, apparently without male progeny, had raised doubts, and many Shi'a were further demoralized by the political impotence and quietism of the Twelver leadership against the Abbasid Caliphate. In this climate, many dissatisfied Twelvers were drawn to the millennialism of the rival Isma'ili branch, who preached the imminent return of the mahdī, the messianic figure of Islamic eschatology, who according to legend would overthrow the usurping Abbasids and destroy their capital Baghdad, restore the unity of the Muslims, conquer Constantinople, ensure the final triumph of Islam and establish a reign of peace and justice.

== Mission to Yemen ==
Ibn al-Fadl's conversion opened the prospect of extending the secret Isma'ili missionary mission (daʿwa) to Yemen. For this purpose, Ibn al-Fadl teamed up with an older convert, the Kufan Ibn Hawshab. Setting off in late May or early June 881, the two men made for Kufa, where they joined the pilgrim caravans, whose multitudes, gathered from all corners of the Islamic world, allowed them to travel with anonymity. After completing the rituals of the pilgrimage at Mecca, the two men arrived in northern Yemen in August.

Main towns in Yemen in the 9th century

Yemen was at the time a troubled province of the Abbasid empire. Caliphal authority had traditionally been weak and mostly limited to the capital, Sana'a, while in the rest of the country, tribal conflicts, sometimes dating to pre-Islamic times, persisted. At the time of Ibn al-Fadl and Ibn Hawshab's arrival, the government was politically fragmented and only loosely under Abbasid suzerainty. Much of the interior was held by the Yu'firid dynasty, who as Sunnis, recognized the Abbasids. After capturing Sana'a in 861, their rule extended from Sa'ada in the north to al-Janad (northeast of Taiz) in the south and Hadramawt in the east. A rival dynasty, the Ziyadids, also nominally loyal to the Abbasids, held Zabid on the western coastal plain, and at times exercised significant control over wide portions of the country. The Banu Manakh family ruled the southern highlands around Taiz, while the northern parts of the country were in practice dominated by warring tribes owing allegiance to no-one. The lack of political unity, the remoteness of the province and its inaccessible terrain, along with deep-rooted Shi'a sympathies in the local population, made Yemen "manifestly fertile territory for any charismatic leader equipped with tenacity and political acumen to realise his ambitions".

After travelling through Sana'a and al-Janad, Ibn Hawshab stayed for a while in Aden. At some point, then or earlier, Ibn al-Fadl left his colleague, and returned to his home region, where he began proselytizing independently in the mountains of Jebel Yafi'i. From this base in the mountains, he began spreading his message in the surrounding areas. He soon secured the support of the ruler of Mudhaykhira. (Note: The historian Ella Landau-Tasseron points to a report in al-Maqrizi of a certain al-Hasan ibn Faraj al-Sanadiqi, an Isma'ili missionary, who sometime in the second half of the 9th century "based himself in Mudhaykhira, acquired many followers and conquered the Yemen. He pretended to be a prophet, committed many atrocities, and was the cause of a massive emigration". It is entirely unclear, however, when this happened, or if there is a connection to later events.) With his help, Ibn al-Fadl led successful attacks against the Emir of Lahj, who controlled the highlands north of Aden. At the same time Ibn Hawshab created another Isma'ili stronghold to the north of the country, in the mountains northwest of Sana'a. Both men propagated the belief in the imminent coming of the mahdī. While the two Isma'ili dāʿīs expanded their influence, in 897, another Shi'a leader entered Yemen: al-Hadi ila'l-Haqq Yahya, a representative of the rival Zaydi sect, established a state based in Sa'ada, with himself as imam.

In the original Isma'ili doctrine, the expected mahdī was Muhammad ibn Isma'il. However, in 899, the Isma'ili daʿwa was split when the Qarmatians renounced the movement's secret leadership in Salamiya, following the future founder of the Fatimid Caliphate, Abdallah al-Mahdi Billah, who dropped the notion of the return of Muhammad ibn Isma'il and proclaimed himself the mahdī. Both Ibn Hawshab and Ibn al-Fadl remained loyal to al-Mahdi. Al-Mahdi was soon forced to flee Salamiya, and in 905, when he was in Egypt, he deliberated between moving on to Yemen or the Maghreb. In view of later events, Wilferd Madelung suggests that doubts about Ibn al-Fadl's loyalty may have played a role in his eventual decision to choose the Maghreb. Indeed, the Isma'ili chief dāʿī Firuz, who at Salamiya had been the chief proxy (bāb) for al-Mahdi, abandoned the latter at Egypt and joined Ibn al-Fadl.

On 25 January 905, Ibn al-Fadl evicted his erstwhile ally from Mudhaykhira. The two Isma'ili leaders now exploited Yemen's political division to expand their domains: in November 905, Ibn al-Fadl captured Sana'a, which allowed Ibn Hawshab to, in turn, seize the Yu'firid base of Shibam. With the exception of Zaydi-held Sa'ada in the north, Ziyadid-ruled Zabid on the western coast, and Aden in the south, all of Yemen was now under Isma'ili control. In late 905, for the first time since coming to Yemen 25 years earlier, the two men met at Shibam. Madelung writes that the meeting "was evidently uneasy," as Ibn Hawshab warned Ibn al-Fadl against overextending his forces, which the latter disregarded. Ibn al-Fadl was the most active of the two in the following years, campaigning across the country against those who still opposed the daʿwa: in spring 906, he subdued the mountain massifs of Hadur and Haraz and conquered the cities of al-Mahjam, al-Kadra, and, briefly, even Zabid.

Both Sana'a and Shibam were briefly lost to the Zaydi imam al-Hadi in 906, but Shibam was recovered before the end of the year, and Ibn al-Fadl reoccupied Sana'a on 17 April 907. Sana'a changed hands a few times again over the following years, until it was finally captured by Ibn al-Fadl in August 911.

== Revolt against Abdallah al-Mahdi Billah ==
At this point, Ibn al-Fadl publicly renounced allegiance to Abdallah al-Mahdi Billah, who had revealed himself and established the Fatimid Caliphate in Ifriqiya in 909. The exact reason for Ibn al-Fadl's denunciation is unknown; it may have been due to personal ambition, following his many successes or disillusionment with al-Mahdi. Al-Mahdi evidently expected that the movement that had brought him to power in Ifriqiya would soon sweep eastwards towards Egypt, where his forces would link up with his Yemeni supporters. For this reason, he had sent to the Yemeni faithful a letter documenting his descent from Ja'far al-Sadiq, the last common imam recognized by Twelvers and Isma'ilis alike. This letter caused much unease and dissension, for not only was the claimed genealogy patently false, but al-Mahdi took pains to clarify that though he was the 'expected one' mahdī, his rule would not bring about the end times, but merely represent another link in a line of imams that was to continue endlessly into the future, thereby contradicting all millennialist expectations vested in his person. Historian Michael Brett even suggests that, since Ibn al-Fadl and Ibn Hawshab are explicitly said to have met in Yemen for the first time in 905/6, the story of their joint mission may have been an invention, although he too emphasizes that the doctrinal issues at stake are obscure. The historian Farhad Daftary labels Ibn al-Fadl as a 'Qarmatian', denoting his opposition to al-Mahdi's claims, much like the original Qarmatians in 899. Indeed, Ibn al-Fadl went as far as to declare himself to be the true mahdī instead.

When Ibn Hawshab rebuffed his colleague's demands to join him and criticized his actions, Ibn al-Fadl marched against Ibn Hawshab. Shibam and Jabal Dhukhar were captured, and after a few battles, Ibn Hawshab was blockaded in the Jabal Maswar. After eight months of siege, in April 912, Ibn Hawshab sought terms, and handed over his son Ja'far as a hostage. Ja'far was returned after a year with a golden necklace as a gift. Ibn al-Fadl died on 28 October 915 at Mudhaykhira of an unknown illness; later Isma'ili legend claimed that he was poisoned by agents of al-Mahdi posing as physicians.

His death, following that of his erstwhile colleague Ibn Hawshab in December of the previous year, left a power vacuum that was swiftly exploited by the Yu'firid ruler As'ad ibn Ibrahim, who had recognized Ibn al-Fadl's suzerainty and had been left in control of Sana'a. In January 916, As'ad began reclaiming the fortresses captured by the Isma'ilis in the previous years. Ibn al-Fadl's son and successor, Fa'fa (or Gha'fa), was unable to stop his advance. On 6 January 917, the Yu'firid forces stormed Mudhaykhira, taking the two sons and three daughters of Ibn al-Fadl prisoner. After his return to Sana'a, As'ad executed the two brothers and twenty of their followers, and sent their heads to the Abbasid caliph in Baghdad. In contrast to the swift end of the southern Isma'ili domain, the northern community founded by Ibn Hawshab has survived to the present day.

== See also ==
- Islamic history of Yemen
- Shia Islam in Yemen

== Sources ==
- Brett, Michael (2001). The Rise of the Fatimids: The World of the Mediterranean and the Middle East in the Fourth Century of the Hijra, Tenth Century CE. The Medieval Mediterranean. Vol. 30. Leiden: BRILL. ISBN 9004117415.
- Daftary, Farhad (2007). The Ismāʿı̄lı̄s: Their History and Doctrines (Second ed.). Cambridge: Cambridge University Press. ISBN 978-0-521-61636-2.
- Eagle, A. B. D. R. (1994). "Al-Hādī Yahyā b. al-Husayn b. al-Qāsim (245–98/859–911): A Biographical Introduction and the Background and Significance of his Imamate". New Arabian Studies. 2: 103–122. ISSN 1351-4709.
- Halm, Heinz (1991). Das Reich des Mahdi: Der Aufstieg der Fatimiden [The Empire of the Mahdi: The Rise of the Fatimids] (in German). Munich: C. H. Beck. ISBN 978-3-406-35497-7.
- Landau-Tasseron, Ella (2010). "Arabia". In Robinson, Chase F. (ed.). The New Cambridge History of Islam, Volume 1: The Formation of the Islamic World, Sixth to Eleventh Centuries. Cambridge: Cambridge University Press. pp. 397–447. ISBN 978-0-521-83823-8.
- Madelung, Wilferd (1991). "Manṣūr al-Yaman". In Bosworth, C. E.; van Donzel, E. & Pellat, Ch. (eds.). The Encyclopaedia of Islam, Second Edition. Volume VI: Mahk–Mid. Leiden: E. J. Brill. pp. 438–439. ISBN 978-90-04-08112-3.
