= Yemen (region) =

Geographic region in the southern Arabian Peninsula

Yemen region إقليم اليمن (Arabic)
- Historical region of Arabia
- Map of the Yemen Region
- Countries: Yemen; Saudi Arabia

Yemen (Arabic: إقليم اليمن, romanized: Eglîm el-Yemen) is a geographic region in South Arabia which includes all lands between Hijaz and Hadhramaut.

== History ==
The term 'Yaman' appears to have originated at the time of Islam and has, in Arabic usage, covered a wide range of the west and south of the Arabian Peninsula, from the region south of Mecca and Medina to what is now Oman. In pre-Islamic times the settled south-west Arabian region was known named after the Kingdoms, Saba and Himyar established there.

In the 20th century, Imam Yahya Muhammad Hamid ed-Din, King of the Mutawakkilite Kingdom of Yemen (North Yemen) attempted to unify Yemen but only managed to consolidate his control in Upper Yemen, Lower Yemen, Marib, and Lower Tihamah. He expressed his claim to Aden and the Aden Protectorate in treaties, such as in the Italo-Yemeni Treaty of 1926. He was unable to dislodge the British from the Aden hinterland or Hadhramaut. British control of Aden was also challenged by his successor King Ahmad bin Yahya who did not recognise British suzerainty in South Arabia and also had ambitions of creating a unified Greater Yemen. In the late 1940s and the early 1950s, Yemen was involved in a series of border skirmishes along the disputed Violet Line, a 1913 Anglo-Ottoman demarcation that served to separate Yemen from the Aden Protectorate.

After Aden achieved independence from Britain in the 1960s, it united with North Yemen in 1990 to form the Republic of Yemen, which saw the majority of Greater Yemen ruled as a single polity for the first time in nearly two centuries.

== See also ==
- Saudi Arabia–Yemen border
- Upper Yemen
- Lower Yemen

== Sources ==
- Schofield, Richard (July 2000) [This is an abridged version of his talk to the British Yemeni Society on 31 March 1999.]. "Negotiating the Saudi-Yemeni international boundary". al-bab.com: An open door to the Arab world. The British-Yemeni Society. Archived from the original on 2005-11-24.
- "History of Yemen". Yemenia Filex. Yemeniafelix Tourism.
- "Yemen: About The Yemen - Part 1". ExecutivePlanet.com. 5 December 2006. Archived from the original on 2010-09-23.
- "Yemen's Historical Capital". Sabanews.net / Saba Net. Yemen News Agency (SABA). 9 June 2004. Archived from the original on 2007-10-29.
