= Harthamah Shar Bamiyan =

Harthamah Shar Bamiyan (Arabic: هرثمة شارباميان) was a ninth century personage and provincial governor for the Abbasid Caliphate.

== Career ==
Shar Bamiyan was related to the ruling family of Bamiyan, a town in the Hindu Kush whose princes bore the Persian title of sher. Following the conversion of the princes of Bamiyan to Islam in the late eighth century, members of the dynasty had entered into the service of the Abbasids and held influential positions at the caliphal court in Iraq. Shar Bamiyan himself entered into such a career and took up residence in Samarra, where he eventually became part of the entourage of the powerful Turk Itakh and, together with Yazid ibn 'Abdallah al-Hulwani, was known as one of Itakh's closest associates.

During the caliphate of al-Wathiq (r. 842–847) Shar Bamiyan was appointed as Itakh's resident governor of the Yemen, in response to a Yemeni appeal for reinforcements against the rebellion of the Yu'firids. After arriving in the Yemen in early 844, he advanced with his army and placed the Yu'firids under siege at Jabal Dhukhar, but his forces failed to breach the rebel fortress. Seeing that he was making no progress against the insurgents, Shar Bamiyan eventually decided to withdraw and retired to Sana'a, leaving the Yu'firid position intact. The failure of the campaign resulted in his dismissal from office, and he was replaced as governor by Ja'far ibn Dinar al-Khayyat.

Shar Bamiyan was later granted the governorship of the Syrian regions of Aleppo, Qinnasrin and the 'awasim early in the reign of al-Mutawakkil (r. 847–861).

== Notes ==
Political offices
Preceded by Abu al-'Ala' Ahmad al-'Amiri	Abbasid governor of the Yemen; 844	Succeeded by Ja'far ibn Dinar al-Khayyat
