= Ja'far ibn Dinar al-Khayyat =

Abbasid Governor of Yemen and General

Ja'far ibn Dinar ibn Abdallah al-Khayyat جعفر بن دينار بن عبد الله الخياط

Abbasid Governor of Yemen
- In office 839 – 840 (first term)
- Monarch: Al-Mu'tasim
- Deputy: Mansur ibn Abd al-Rahman al-Tanukhi & Abdallah ibn Hamdawayh

Abbasid Governor of Yemen
- In office 844 – 847 (second term)
- Monarch: Al-Wathiq
- Preceded by: Harthamah Shar Bamiyan
- Succeeded by: Himyar ibn al-Harith

Personal details
- Children: Mansur ibn Ja'far al-Khayyat
- Parent: Dinar ibn Abdallah (father)
- Military career
- Allegiance: Abbasid Caliphate
- Branch: Abbasid Army
- Service years: fl. c. 830s - 860s
- Rank: Commander
- Conflicts: Arab–Byzantine wars

Ja'far ibn Dinar ibn Abdallah al-Khayyat (Arabic: جعفر بن دينار بن عبد الله الخياط) was a ninth-century military commander for the Abbasid Caliphate.

== Career ==
Ja'far was likely the son of Dinar ibn Abdallah, an army commander and provincial governor who was active during the caliphate of al-Ma'mun (r. 813–833). He himself first appears in the last years of al-Ma'mun's reign, when he participated in the caliph's 830 invasion of Byzantine Anatolia and was sent with Ujayf ibn Anbasah to receive the submission of the commander of fortress of Sinan.

Ja'far's prominence increased during the reign of al-Ma'mun's successor al-Mu'tasim (r. 833–842), who employed him in several of the campaigns of his caliphate. In 837 he and Itakh were sent by the caliph to reinforce al-Afshin against the rebel Babak Khorramdin in Adharbayjan, and he played a leading role in the effort to take Babak's stronghold of al-Badhdh. In the following year he was placed in command of the caliph's left wing during the Amorium Campaign against the Byzantines, and during the assault against Amorium itself he was assigned a sector of the city to attack. In 839 he received the governorship of the Yemen and appointed deputy governors to enforce his rule in that province, but in 840 he incurred the anger of the caliph, who dismissed him from his position and briefly imprisoned him in the custody of Ashinas.

Ja'far was appointed governor of the Yemen a second time in 846, this time by the caliph al-Wathiq (r. 842–847), and was tasked with dealing with the long-running Yu'firid insurgency there. After pausing to go on the pilgrimage, Ja'far entered the Yemen with several thousand cavalry and infantry and proceeded against the rebels. Although his initial advance against the Yu'firids ended without accomplishment, he went on a second expedition soon after and placed their fortress under siege. Upon learning of the death of al-Wathiq in 847, however, he concluded a truce with the Yu'firids and retired to Sana'a. Shortly after this he decided to withdraw to the province altogether and returned to Iraq, leaving his son Muhammad to stay behind as his deputy until Himyar ibn al-Harith was appointed as governor in his stead.

During the caliphate of al-Mutawakkil (r. 847–861), Ja'far oversaw the events of the festival season (mawsim) during the annual pilgrimages of 854 to 858, and was also assigned the supervision of the Mecca Road. Under al-Musta'in (r. 862–866), he was given command of the summer expedition (sa'ifah) of 863 and undertook a successful raid against the Byzantines, but when he gave the governor of Malatyah, 'Umar al-Aqta', permission to continue with the invasion on his own, the Byzantines struck back and killed 'Umar at the disastrous Battle of Lalakaon. Following the flight of al-Musta'in to Baghdad in 865, Ja'far was one of the few officers who remained behind in Samarra, and instead supported the rival caliph al-Mu'tazz (r. 866–869). He is last mentioned that year, when al-Mu'tazz placed him in charge of his guard (haras).

Ja'far's son Mansur ibn Ja'far al-Khayyat later rose to some prominence, likewise serving as a military commander and governor until he was killed in battle during the Zanj Rebellion in 872.

== Notes ==
Political offices
| Preceded by Harthamah Shar Bamiyan | Abbasid governor of the Yemen; 844–847 | Succeeded by Himyar ibn al-Harith |
