= Mansur ibn Abd al-Rahman al-Tanukhi =

Abbasid governor of Yemen (839–842)

Mansur ibn Abd al-Rahman al-Tanukhi منصور بن عبد الرحمن التنوخي

Abbasid Governor of Yemen
- In office 839–842
- Monarchs: al-Mu'tasim, al-Wathiq
- Deputy: Abdallah ibn Hamdawayh
- Preceded by: Abd al-Rahim ibn Ja'far ibn Sulayman al-Hashimi
- Succeeded by: Abu al-Ala Ahmad al-Amiri

Personal details
- Born: Abbasid Caliphate
- Parent: Abd al-Rahman (father)

Manṣūr ibn ʿAbd al-Rahmān al-Tanūkhī (Arabic: منصور بن عبد الرحمن التنوخي) was a ninth-century governor of the Yemen for the Abbasid Caliphate.

== Career ==
Mansur was appointed as resident governor of the Yemen on behalf of Ja'far ibn Dinar al-Khayyat, who had received the administration of the province from the caliph al-Mu'tasim (r. 833–842), and he arrived in Sana'a at the end of 839. Although he initially managed the province by himself, he was soon joined by Ja'far's co-governor Abdallah ibn Hamdawayh, and thereafter the two shared power with each other. When Ja'far was dismissed from the governorship in 840, both Mansur and Abdallah were retained by his successor Itakh, who confirmed them in their positions, and they remained in command of the Yemen until the death of al-Mu'tasim in 842.

Shortly after the accession of al-Wathiq, Itakh decided to dismiss Mansur and Abdallah and replace them with Abu al-Ala Ahmad al-Amiri. The latter was still en route to Sana'a, however, when the town was suddenly threatened by the Yu'firid rebel Yu'fir ibn Abd al-Rahman, who sent an army under the command of Tarif ibn Thabit/Malik to capture it. Mansur therefore marched out with his own forces and routed the Yu'firids in battle, forcing the rebels to withdraw and allowing Abu al-Ala to enter Sana'a unopposed.

== Notes ==
Political offices
Preceded by Abd al-Rahim ibn Ja'far ibn Sulayman al-Hashimi	Abbasid governor of the Yemen; 839–842; With: Abdallah ibn Hamdawayh	Succeeded by Abu al-Ala Ahmad al-Amiri
