= Abu al-Ala Ahmad al-Amiri =

Abbasid governor of Yemen (842–844)

Abbasid Governor of Yemen
- In office 842–844
- Monarch: al-Wathiq
- Preceded by: Mansur ibn Abd al-Rahman al-Tanukhi
- Succeeded by: Harthamah Shar Bamiyan

Personal details
- Parent: al-Ala al-Amiri (father)

Abu al-Ala Ahmad ibn al-Ala al-Amiri (Arabic: أبو العلاء أحمد بن العلاء العامري; d. ca. 844) was a ninth-century governor of the Yemen for the Abbasid Caliphate.

He received his appointment as resident governor from the Turkish officer Itakh, shortly after the accession of the caliph al-Wathiq (r. 842–847). Upon his arrival in the Yemen, the Yu'firid rebel Yu'fir ibn Abd al-Rahman dispatched an army to occupy the chief town of Sana'a, but local forces and the outgoing governor Mansur ibn 'Abd al-Rahman al-Tanukhi met the rebels in battle and defeated them, killing a thousand on the field and decapitating the prisoners they took. Abu al-Ala was consequently able to enter Sana'a, and he thereafter remained governor of the province until he died. His brother then assumed his functions as governor for an interim period, before Harthamah Shar Bamiyan arrived to take up the post.

== Notes ==
Political offices
Preceded by Mansur ibn Abd al-Rahman al-Tanukhi	Abbasid governor of the Yemen; 842 – ca. 844	Succeeded by Harthamah Shar Bamiyan
