= Mudhaykhirah =

Mudhaykhirah مذيخرة Qalamah
- Village
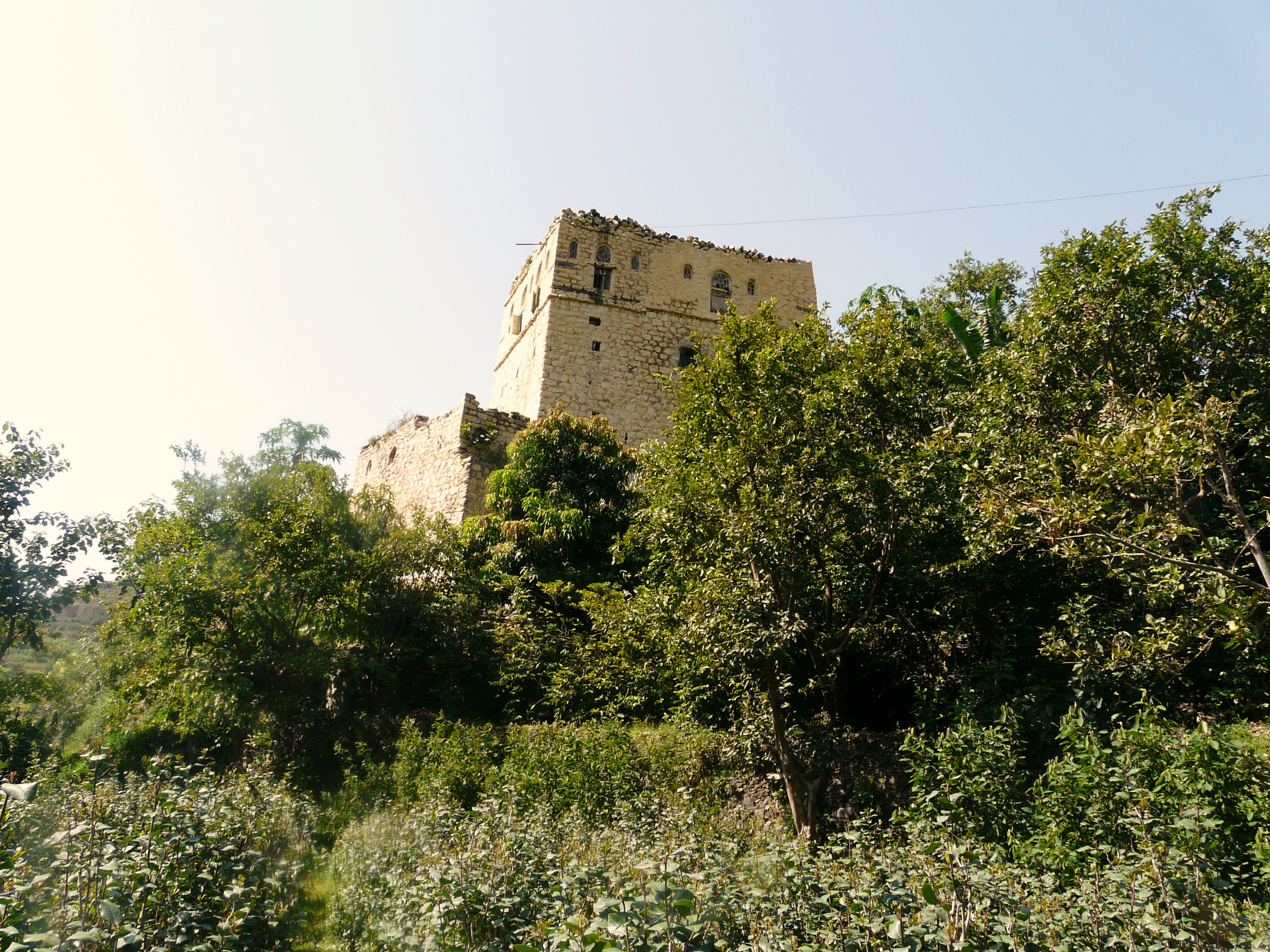
- Building in Mudhaykhirah

- Location in Yemen
- Coordinates: 13°53.13′N 43°58.03′E
- Country: Yemen
- Governorate: Ibb
- District: Mudhaykhirah
- Subdistrict: Mudhaykhirah

Population (2004)
  - Total: 1,245
- Time zone: UTC+3 (AST)

Mudhaykhirah (Arabic: مذيخرة) is a village in southwestern Yemen. It is administratively a part of the Mudhaykhirah subdistrict in Mudhaykhirah District, Ibb Governorate. The village had a population of 1,245 according to the 2004 census.

== History ==
Various accounts are given regarding the origins of Mudhaykirah. According to Umara ibn Abi al-Hasan al-Yamani, the town was founded by a mawla of the Ziyadid dynasty in the ninth century; Baha al-Din al-Janadi, on the other hand, claims that it was built by a member of the Banu Manakh, who conquered the area during the reign of the Abbasid caliph al-Ma'mun (r. 813–833).

In 905 Mudhaykhirah was captured by the Isma'ili missionary (da'i) Ali ibn al-Fadl al-Jayshani, who expelled and killed its Manakhi ruler in battle. The town subsequently served as the base of Ali's operations for the remainder of his career. A short time after Ibn al-Fadl's death in 915, the town was besieged and taken by the Yu'firids and devastated in the process; al-Janadi, writing in the fourteenth century, remarked that it remained in a ruined state from that point until his own time.

The town was also known to the tenth-century geographer Ibn Hawqal as a source of wars plants for textile dyes.
