= Ja'far ibn Mansur al-Yaman =

10th-century Isma'ili missionary and theological writer

Ja'far ibn Mansur al-Yaman (Arabic: جعفر بن منصور اليمن) was an Isma'ili missionary (dāʿī) and theological writer of the 10th century. Originally born and raised in Yemen, where his father Ibn Hawshab had established the Isma'ili daʿwa in the late 9th century, he fled the country to the court of the Fatimid caliphs in Ifriqiya, where he remained until his death. He composed poems in praise of the Fatimids' victory over the uprising of Abu Yazid, a biography of his father, and authored or compiled a number of important theological treatises.

== Life ==
Ja'far was the son of the Kufan missionary Ibn Hawshab, who established the Isma'ili doctrine in the Yemen. By the time of his death in 914, along with his colleague Ali ibn al-Fadl al-Jayshani he had conquered large parts of the country, earning the honorific laqab of Manṣūr al-Yaman ("Conqueror of Yemen"). In 911, Ibn al-Fadl renounced allegiance to the Fatimid caliph Abdallah al-Mahdi, the leader of the Isma'ili movement, and declared himself the mahdī. Ibn Hawshab refused to join him in his rebellion, and Ibn al-Fadl besieged his erstwhile colleague at the fortress of Jabal Maswar. After eight months of siege, in April 912, Ibn Hawshab sought terms, and handed over Ja'far as a hostage. Ja'far was returned after a year with a golden necklace as a gift.

After Ibn Hawshab, his sons quarrelled among themselves. Embroiled in a conflict with his brother Abu'l-Hasan, Ja'far eventually left Yemen and made for the Fatimid court in Ifriqiya. He entered the service of the second Fatimid caliph, al-Qa'im bi-Amr Allah (r. 933–946), and witnessed the great uprising of Abu Yazid, which almost brought down the Fatimid state. He wrote poems in celebration of the eventual Fatimid victories and the gradual suppression of the revolt in 945–948, and received a fine residence in the new Fatimid capital, Mansuriya, built by the third caliph, al-Mansur bi-Nasr Allah (r. 946–953). Under Caliph al-Mu'izz li-Din Allah (r. 953–975) he mortgaged his house and almost lost it due to debts, but was saved by the Caliph's intervention. He died at some unknown point in the early reign of al-Mu'izz.

== Writings ==
A quasi-hagiographic biography of his father is attributed to him, although it may also have been an autobiography written by Ibn Hawshab himself. It is now lost, but known through extensive quotations in later authors, and is, according to the historian Heinz Halm, "one of the most important sources for the history of the daʿwa".

His theological works have survived in fuller form, as they were frequently copied and reused in later Isma'ili compendiums. The most notable work is the Book of the Sage and Disciple (Kitāb al-ʿĀlim wa’l-ghulām), which is also sometimes attributed to his father. It consists of a series of encounters between a novice and his spiritual guide (the dāʿī), who gradually reveals the hidden, esoteric knowledge (bāṭin) to his disciple. According to the scholar Shafique Virani, this work "is considered Arabic literature’s most accomplished example of the full-scale narrated dramatic dialogue".

He is also attributed with the Kitāb al-kashf, a compilation of six treatises on various issues, including exegesis by means of allegory (taʾwīl) of the Quran, and on the early Isma'ili conception of the Imamate. The Sarāʾir wa-asrār al-nuṭaqāʾ, an its expanded sequel Asrār al-nuṭaqāʾ, deal with esoteric interpretations of mythological figures and the lives of the Islamic prophets.

== Sources ==
- Daftary, Farhad (2004). Ismaili Literature: A Bibliography of Sources and Studies. London and New York: I.B. Tauris. ISBN 978-0-8577-1386-5.
- Daftary, Farhad (2007). The Ismāʿı̄lı̄s: Their History and Doctrines (Second ed.). Cambridge: Cambridge University Press. ISBN 978-0-521-61636-2.
- Halm, Heinz (1991). Das Reich des Mahdi: Der Aufstieg der Fatimiden [The Empire of the Mahdi: The Rise of the Fatimids] (in German). Munich: C. H. Beck. ISBN 978-3-406-35497-7.
- Haji, Hamid (2008). "Jaʿfar B. Manșur-Al-Yaman". In Yarshater, Ehsan (ed.). Encyclopædia Iranica. Vol. XIV: Isfahan IX–Jobbāʾi. London and New York: Routledge & Kegan Paul. p. 349. ISBN 978-1-934283-08-0.
- Madelung, Wilferd (1991). "Manṣūr al-Yaman". In Bosworth, C. E.; van Donzel, E. & Pellat, Ch. (eds.). The Encyclopaedia of Islam, Second Edition. Volume VI: Mahk–Mid. Leiden: E. J. Brill. pp. 438–439. doi:10.1163/1573-3912_islam_SIM_4941. ISBN 978-90-04-08112-3.
- Virani, Shafique (2008). "The Book of the Master and the Disciple by Ja'far ibn Mansur al-Yaman". In Daftary, Farhad; Hirji, Zulfikar (eds.). The Ismailis: An Illustrated History. London: Azimuth Editions, in association with the Institute of Ismaili Studies. p. 69. ISBN 978-1-898592-26-6.
- Ismail K. Poonawala, Biobibliography of Ismāʿīlī Literature, Malibu, 1977
