= Upper Yemen =

Region in Yemen

Upper Yemen (Arabic: اليمن العليا) and Lower Yemen are traditional regions of the northern highlands of Yemen. Northern Highlands and Southern Highlands are terms more commonly used presently (see: geography of Yemen).

The Sumara Mountains just south of the town of Yarim denote the boundaries of the two regions. These two traditional regions also coincide with Gourchenour and Obermeyer's ecological zones. Upper Yemen is home to practitioners of the Zaidi sect of Islam and inhabitants of the region are sometimes referred to by that name. Major urban centers include Dhamar, Hajjah, and the Yemeni capital of Sanaa.

== Sources ==
- Schmitz, Charles; Burrowes, Robert D. (2018). "Upper, Middle, and Lower Yemen". Historical Dictionary of Yemen (Third ed.). Lanham, Maryland: Rowman & Littlefield. pp. 500–501. ISBN 9781538102329.
