= Lower Yemen =

Region in Yemen

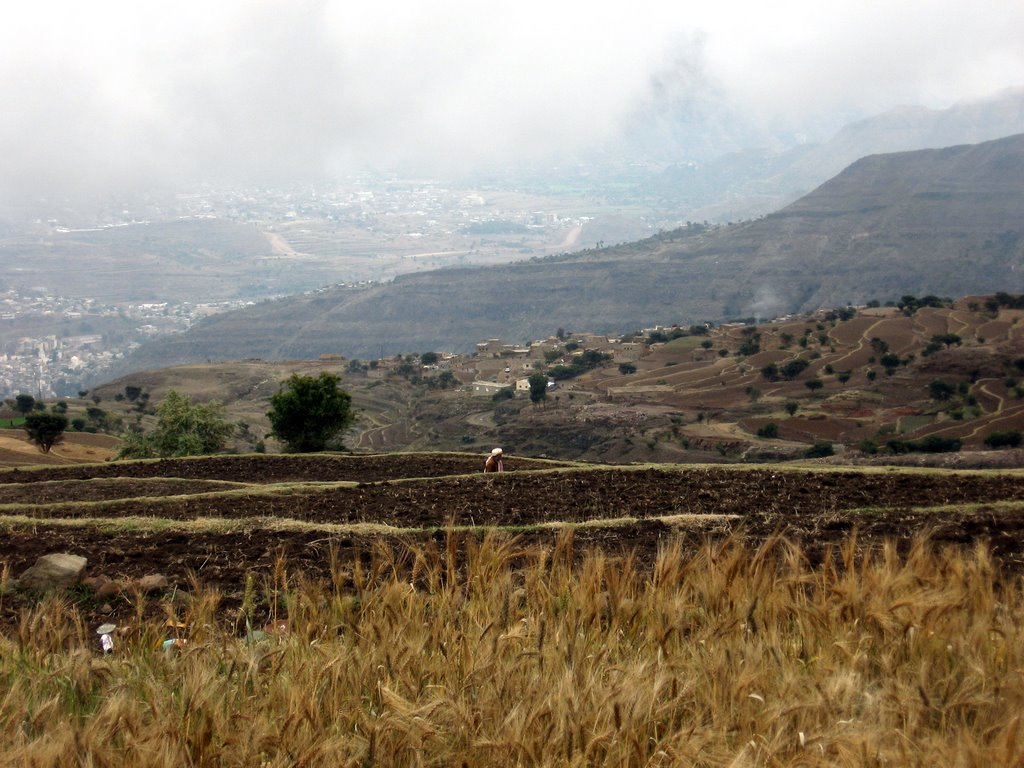
Lower Yemen Highlands near Ibb.

Lower Yemen (Arabic: اليمن السفلى) and Upper Yemen are traditional regions of the northern highlands of Yemen. Northern Highlands and Southern Highlands are terms more commonly used presently.

The Sumara Mountains just south of the town of Yarim denote the boundaries of the two regions. These two traditional regions also coincide with Gourchenour and Obermeyer's ecological zones. Major urban centers include Ibb and Taiz.

== Sources ==
- Schmitz, Charles; Burrowes, Robert D. (2018). "Upper, Middle, and Lower Yemen". Historical Dictionary of Yemen (Third ed.). Lanham, Maryland: Rowman & Littlefield. pp. 500–501. ISBN 9781538102329.
