= Yu'firids =

Islamic Himyarite dynasty in Yemen

Yufi'rid dynasty بنو يعفر
- 847–997
- Capital: Shibam Kawkaban; Sanaa
- Common languages: Arabic; Judeo-Yemeni Arabic
- Religion: Sunni Islam
- Government: Emirate
- Emir
  - 847-872 (first): Yu'fir bin ʿAbd ar-Raḥmān al-Ḥiwālī al-Ḥimyārī
  - 963-997 (last): Abdallah bin Qahtan
- History
  - Established: 847
  - Disestablished: 997
- Currency: Dinar
Preceded by	Succeeded by
Abbasid Caliphate	Ziyadid dynasty

The Yuʿfirids (Arabic: بنو يعفر, romanized: Banū Yuʿfir) were an Islamic Himyarite dynasty that held power in the highlands of Yemen from 847 to 997. The name of the family is often incorrectly rendered as "Yafurids". They nominally acknowledged the suzerainty of the Abbasid caliphs. Their centres were Sanaa and Shibam Kawkaban. The Yuʿfirids followed Sunni Islam.

== Rise of the dynasty ==
The Yuʿfirids from Shibam Kawkaban began to expand their power base in the Yemeni highland as the direct rule of the Abbasids over Yemen declined. They are descended from D̲h̲ū Ḥiwāl tribe, which is a tribe from Shibam Kawkaban (in modern-day Al Mahwit Governorate, northwest of Sanaa). The first attack on Sanaa in 841 failed miserably and the Abbasid governor received troops from Iraq for assistance. Nevertheless, the Yuʿfirids were able to successfully repel the counterattacks against their stronghold in Shibam. In 847 they conquered the area between Saada and Taiz. Sanaa fell to their arms when the governor Himyar ibn al-Harith fled from Yemen, and for a while it became the headquarters of the new dynasty.

== Internal feuds and temporary eclipse ==
After a stable reign of 25 years, the founder of the dynasty, Yu'fir bin ʿAbd ar-Raḥmān al-Ḥiwālī al-Ḥimyārī, left affairs of state to his son Muhammad in 872. Muhammad preferred to use Shibam as the capital of his kingdom, rather than Sanaa. In 873 he received a diploma of confirmation from the Abbasid caliph. Muhammad ruled over Saana, Janad and Hadramawt but paid formal deference to the Ziyadid dynasty in the Tihama lowland. A flood that inundated Sanaa in 876 served as the motive for Muhammad to undertake the pilgrimage to Mecca and henceforth devote his time to religion. The reins of government were given to his son Ibrahim, who murdered his father and uncle in the mosque of Shibam in 892 (or 882) to ensure that there would be no pretensions of power from them. The instigator of the murders was none but his own grandfather, the ex-ruler Yu'fir. Now, however, a series of revolts led to the expulsion of the Yuʿfirids from Sanaa. An Abbasid governor took charge of the city for a while, but after 895 conditions turned increasingly chaotic.

== Competition for Sanaa ==
At the beginning of the tenth century there were struggles between the followers of the Zaydiyyah branch of Islam and other polities of the Yemeni highlands. The first Zaydi imam al-Hadi ila'l-Haqq Yahya temporarily took over Sanaa in 901 but was later forced to leave the city. In the same period Ibn Haushab and Ali bin al-Fadl al-Jayshani disseminated the creed of the Fatimids among the highland tribes and acquired a great following. The two leaders are usually referred to as Qarmatians although they were actually appointed as da'is (leaders) by the Fatimid ruler. They were able to conquer Sanaa in 905 and limit the kingdom of the Yuʿfirids to Shibam Kawkaban. For long periods the Yufirid ruler Abū Ḥassān Asʿad bin Ibrāhīm had to stay in the Jawf region further to the north. Sanaa shifted hands with great frequency in this period; from 901 to 913 the city is said to have been conquered 20 times, surrendered through negotiation three times, and been unsuccessfully besieged five times. Eventually the dynasty managed to defeat the followers of the Fatimids and win back Sanaa in 916.

== Later history ==
Abū Ḥassān Asʿad died in 944 and was, as it turned out, the last grand Yufirid leader. In the middle of the tenth century the decline of the dynasty set in, as the members of the family feuded with each other. The Zaydi imam al-Mukhtar al-Qasim managed to acquire Sanaa in 956 but was murdered in the same year by a Hamdan chief called Ibn al-Dahhak, who dominated politics until 963 and acknowledged the Ziyadids in Zabid. Next, a chief from Khawlan called al-Asmar Yusuf installed the prince Abdallah bin Qahtan on the throne. Abdallah had a long and turbulent reign and successfully attacked the Ziyadids in 989, investing and plundering Zabid. He then stopped mentioning the Abbasids in the khutba and instead adhered to the Egyptian Fatimid caliph. Abdallah died in 997 and was succeeded by his son As'ad (II). However, the authority of the Yuʿfirids in Sanaa had vanished and they had no significance anymore. The clan is occasionally mentioned in chronicles until as late as 1280.

== List of rulers ==
- Yu'fir bin Abd ar-Rahman (847–872)
- Muhammad bin Yu'fir (872-892 or 872–882), son
- Abd al-Qahir bin Ahmad bin Yu'fir (892), nephew
- Ibrahim bin Muhammad (892-898 or 882–886), son of Muhammad bin Yu'fir
- Reign of the Qarmatians in Sanaa (905-916)
- As'ad bin Ibrahim (c. 898-944), son of Ibrahim bin Muhammad
- Muhammad bin Ibrahim (944–956), brother
- Abdallah bin Qahtan (963–997), grandson

== See also ==
- History of Yemen
- Islamic history of Yemen
- Imams of Yemen

== Sources ==
- Smith, G. Rex (1987). "Politische Geschichte des islamischen Jemen bis zur ersten türkischen Invasion (1 bis 945 Hidschra = 633 bis 1538 n. Chr.)" [Political History of Islamic Yemen until the First Turkish Invasion (1 to 945 AH = 633 to 1538 AD)]. In Daum, Werner (ed.). Jemen. 3000 Jahre Kunst und Kultur des glücklichen Arabien [Yemen. 3000 Years of Art and Civilisation in Arabia Felix]. Innsbruck and Frankfurt a.M.: Pinguin. pp. 136–154. ISBN 3-7016-2251-5.
- Smith, G. Rex (2002). "Yuʿfirids". In Bearman, P. J.; Bianquis, Th.; Bosworth, C. E.; van Donzel, E. & Heinrichs, W. P. (eds.). The Encyclopaedia of Islam, Second Edition. Volume XI: W–Z. Leiden: E. J. Brill. p. 342. doi:10.1163/1573-3912_islam_SIM_8026. ISBN 978-90-04-12756-2.
