= Terrai Bainen District =

Terrai Bainem District
- District
- Country: Algeria
- Province: Mila Province
- Time zone: UTC+1 (CET)

Terrai Bainem District is a district of Mila Province, Algeria.

The district is further divided into 3 municipalities:

- Terrai Bainen
- Amira Arras
- Tessala Lemtai

There are 6 named mountains in Terrai Bainen District. The highest and the most prominent mountain is Kef Bouhamra.
