= Redjas =

Town in Algeria

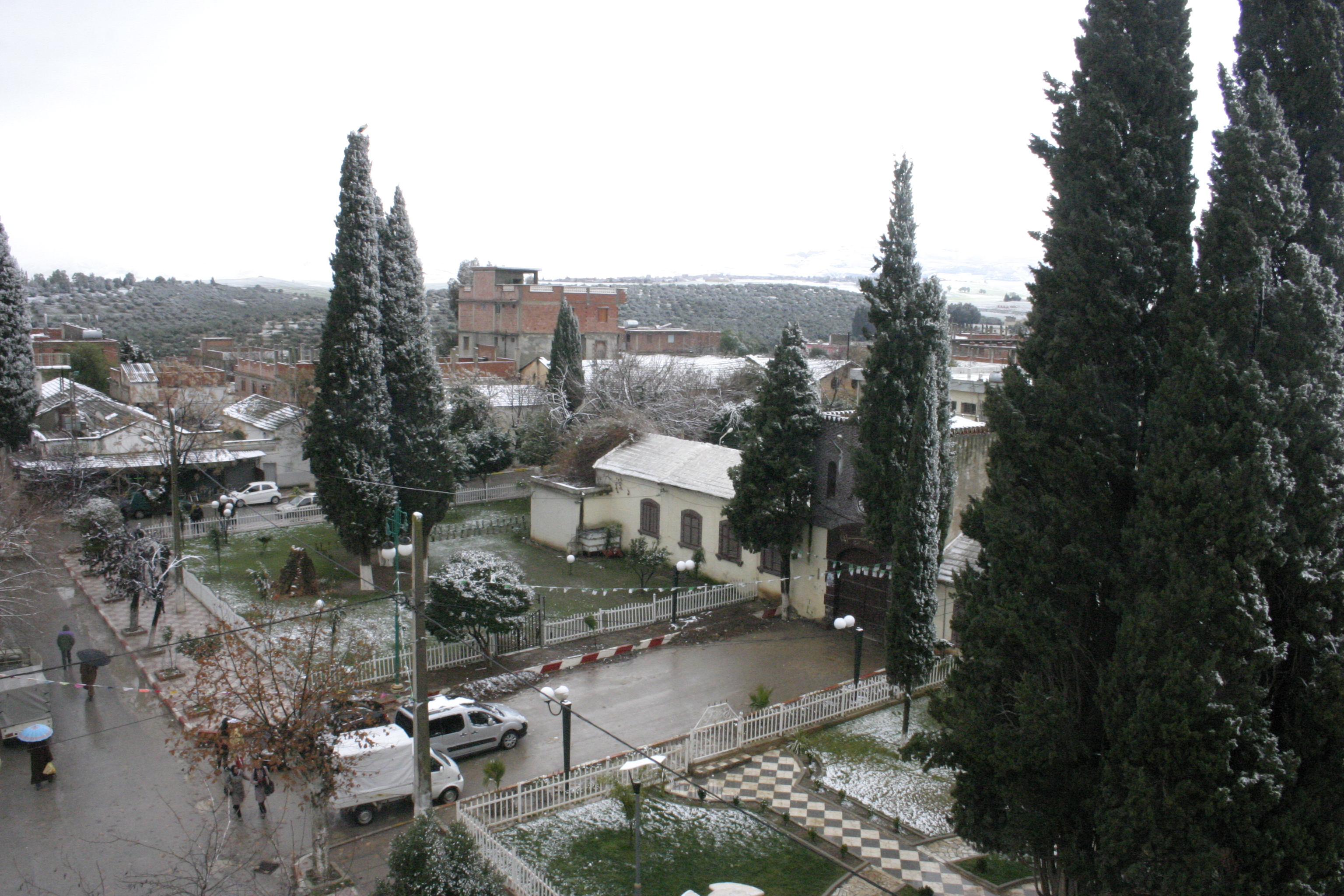
Redjas

Redjas رجاص is a town in Mila Province, Algeria. At 16 km at west from Mila city, Redjas is the commune and district seat of Oued Endja, and was established in 1875. The city has an approximate area of 1.5 km^{2} and an elevation of 340 to 396 m above sea level. As of 2008, Redjas had a population of 13,883.
