= Aïn Beida Harriche District =

- District
- Country: Algeria
- Province: Mila Province
- Time zone: UTC+1 (CET)

Aïn Beida Harriche District is a district of Mila Province, Algeria.

== Municipalities ==
The district is further divided into 2 municipalities:

- Aïn Beida Harriche
- Elayadi Barbes
