= Sidi Merouane District =

- District
- Country: Algeria
- Province: Mila Province
- Time zone: UTC+1 (CET)

Sidi Merouane District is a district of Mila Province, Algeria.

The district is further divided into 2 municipalities:

- Sidi Merouane
- Chigara
