= Tassadane Haddada District =

- District
- Country: Algeria
- Province: Mila Province
- Time zone: UTC+1 (CET)

Tassadane Haddada District is a district of Mila Province, Algeria.

The district is further divided into 2 municipalities:

- Tassadane Haddada
- Minar Zarza
