= Oued Endja District =

- District
- Country: Algeria
- Province: Mila Province
- Time zone: UTC+1 (CET)

Oued Endja District is a district of Mila Province, Algeria.

The district is further divided into 3 municipalities:

- Oued Endja
- Zeghaia
- Ahmed Rachedi
