= Rouached District =

- District
- Country: Algeria
- Province: Mila Province
- Time zone: UTC+1 (CET)

Rouached District is a district of Mila Province, Algeria.

== Municipalities ==
The district is further divided into 2 municipalities:

- Rouached
- Tiberguent
