= Mila District, Algeria =

Mila District
- District
- Country: Algeria
- Province: Mila Province
- Time zone: UTC+1 (CET)

Mila District is a district of Mila Province, Algeria.

== Municipalities ==
The district is further divided into 3 municipalities:

- Mila
- Aïn Tine
- Sidi Khelifa
