= Chelghoum Laïd =

Chelghoum Laïd شلغوم العيد
- Commune
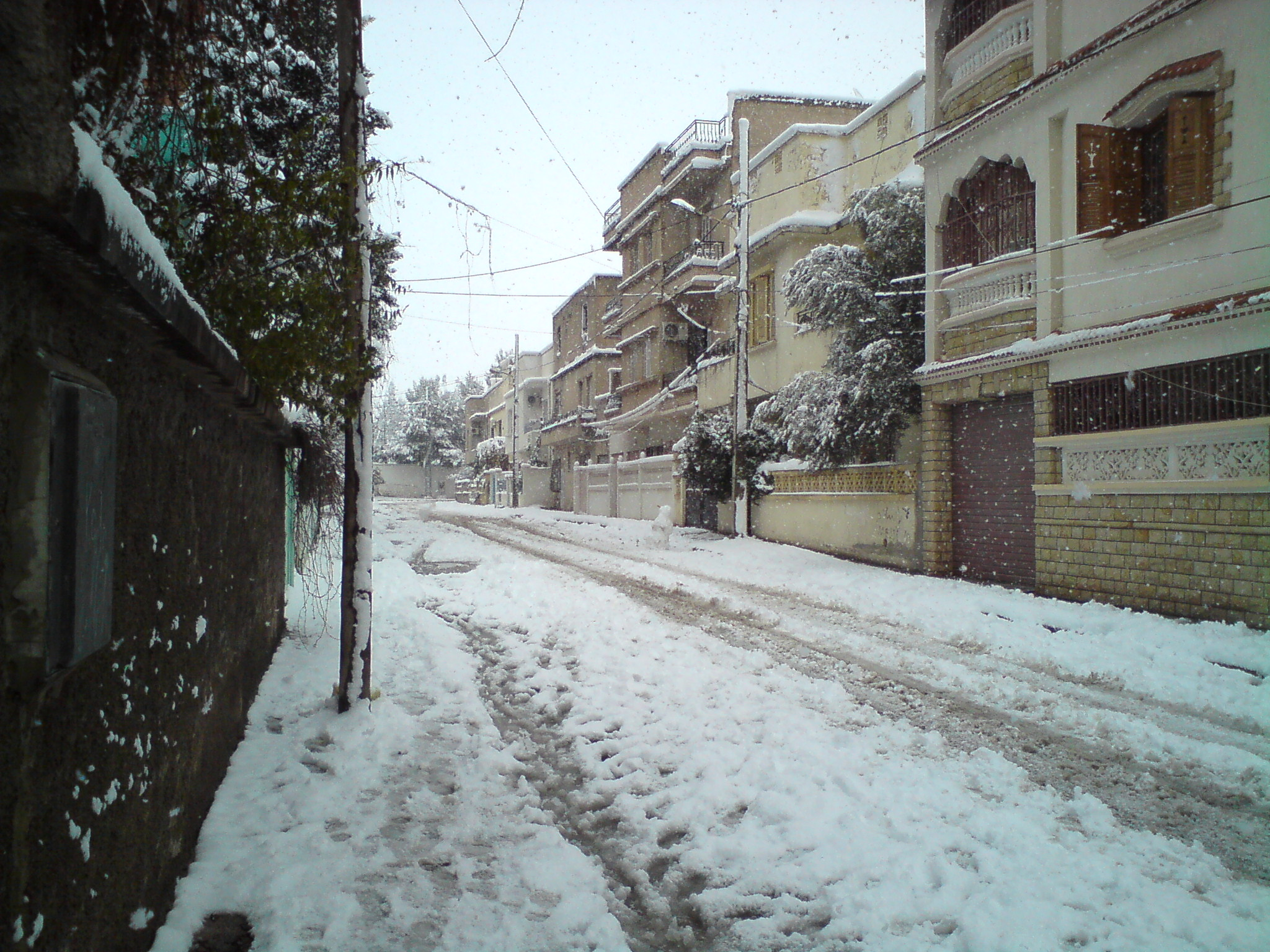
- Chelghoum Laïd.

- Location of Chelghoum Laïd in Mila Province

- Location in Algeria
- Coordinates: 36°10′N 6°10′E
- Country: Algeria
- Province: Mila Province
- District: Chelghoum Laïd District
- APC: 2012-2017

Government
  - Type: Municipality
  - Mayor: Abdelhak Zegad

Population (2008)
  - Total: 82,560
- Time zone: UTC+1 (CET)
- ISO 3166 code: CP

Chelghoum Laïd is a city in Chelghoum Laïd District, Mila Province, Algeria. In 2008 it had a population of 54,495.

Chelghoum laid is the biggest city in Mila province. It is known for its fruit and vegetable national market.

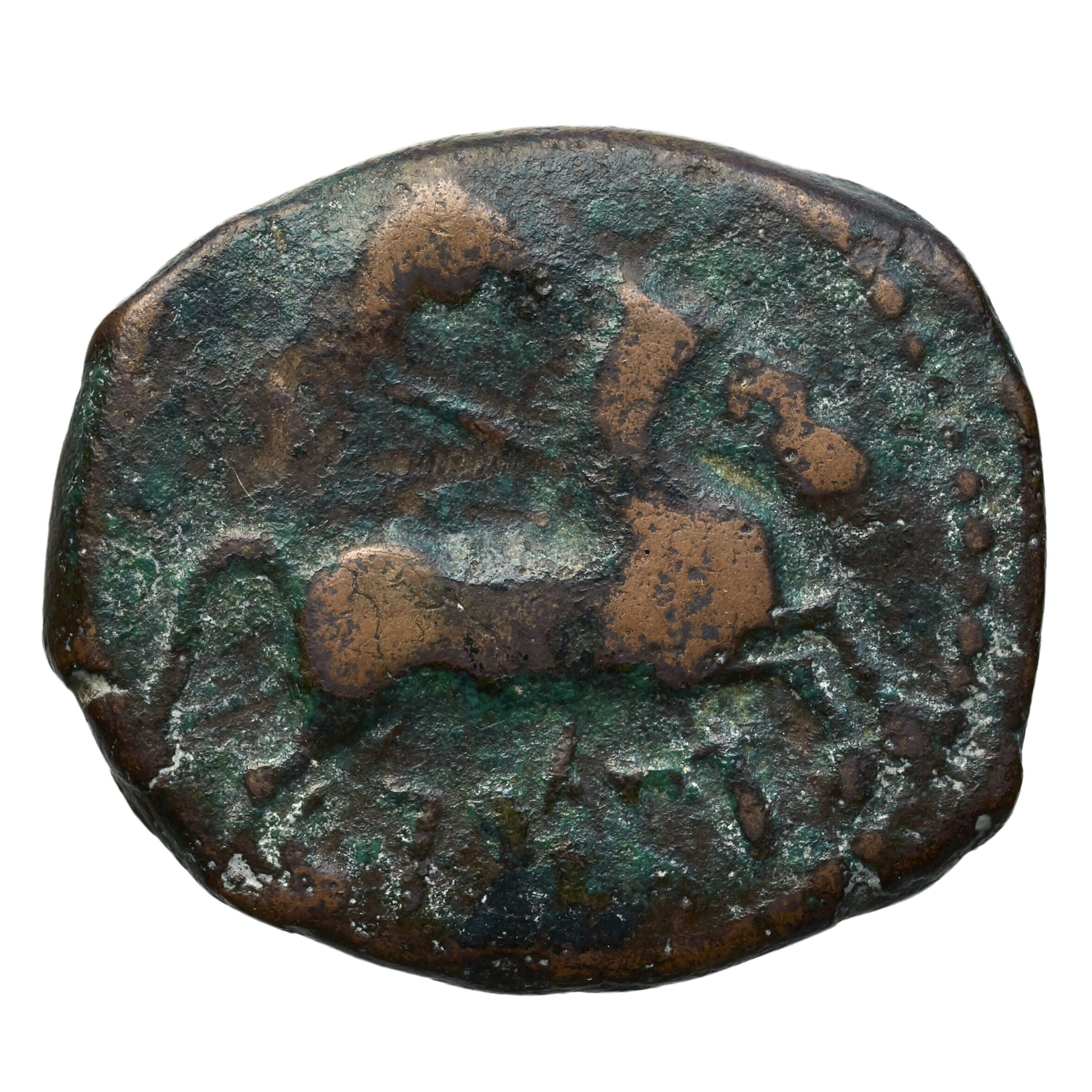
A coin of Salviana with a Punic legend ʾšlbn

In the south-east of Chelghoum Laïd, near the border of Teleghma, was the ancient Salviana.

== Artist of Chelghoum Laïd ==
- Houssam Eddine Hafdi
