= Houssam Eddine Hafdi =

Algerian painter

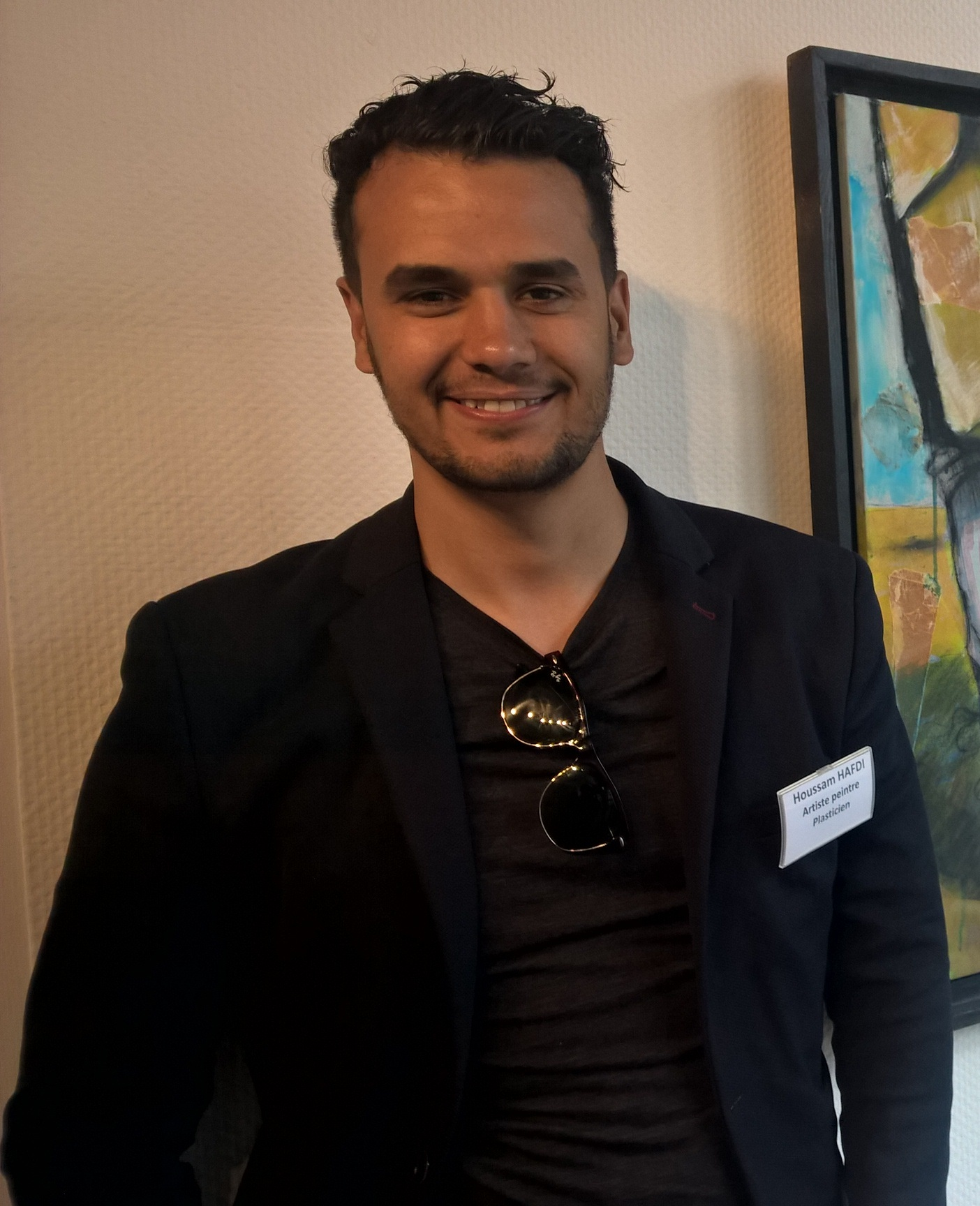
- Hafdi in 2017

Personal details
- Born: March 29, 1990 Chelghoum Laïd, Mila Province, Algeria
- Occupation: Artist, painter

Houssam Eddine Hafdi, (Arabic : حسام الدين حافظي; born 29 March 1990 in Chelghoum Laïd, Mila Province in Algeria), is a Chaoui Algerian artist.

== Biography ==
Native of Chelghoum Laïd, he studied at first in the Constantine's School of Fine Arts and was honored top of the class in 2016. Then, he was a professor of plastic arts in the division of the scientific sports and cultural activities (DASCS), at the University of Constantine 3. since 2018, He exercises the plastic art within his workshop in Denain, France. works were exposed in Padua in Italy, in Vilnius in Lithuania 2016, in Barcelona, in France, in Antwerp in Belgium, in Rotterdam in Netherlands in 2017.

== Influence ==
His searches on the influence of the modern art by the African art, brought him to be inspired by certain masterpieces as Les Demoiselles d'Avignon by Pablo Picasso and the Self-portrait and Sunflowers by Vincent van Gogh. The references to these big masterpieces of the history of art, the influence of the expressionism, the naive art, the contemporary and the meaning of colors, are so many elements to be observed in his canvas.

== Expositions ==
=== Single ===
- 2016 : 3 expositions in the centre culturel Arts et Expressions in Les Carroz d'Arâches, France.
- 2017 : Centre culturel Arts et Expressions in Les Carroz d'Arâches, France.
- 2017 : Théatre de poche de Béthune France. 2017 : Centre culturel Odyssée in Valenciennes, France.
- 2018 : Office de tourisme porte in Hainaut, France.

=== Collective ===
- 2016 : Musée Mediolanum in Padua in Italy.
- 2017 : 2 expositions in the hôtel de ville of Maracena (Granada), Spain.
- 2017 : The Crown, Schiedam, Pays-Bas 2017 : EAT, Anvers, Belgium.
- 2017 : Centre culturel de Montjuic Barcelona, Spain.
- 2017 : Office de tourisme Camiers, Ste Cécile, France
- 2017 : Neutral-ism Musée Nereto, Italy.
- 2017 : Musee de San Benedetto delTorento, Italy.
