= Chelghoum Laïd District =

Coordinates: 36.1667°N 6.1667°E

- District
- Country: Algeria
- Province: Mila Province

Area
  - Total: 252.53 sq mi (654.05 km^{2})

Population (2008)
  - Total: 137,448
- Time zone: UTC+1 (CET)

Chelghoum Laïd District is a district of Mila Province, Algeria.

The district is further divided into 3 municipalities:

- Aïn Mellouk
- Oued Athmania
- Chelghoum Laïd
