= Tadjenanet District =

- District
- Country: Algeria
- Province: Mila Province
- Time zone: UTC+1 (CET)

Tadjenanet District (Arabic: تاجنانت), formerly called Saint-Donat, is a town in eastern Algeria, belonging to the wilaya of Mila and home to 53,536 inhabitants (in 2008). The city is best known for its weekly market, considered the first in eastern Algeria. and which is the main cause of economic progress of the city in recent years.

== Municipalities ==
The district is further divided into 3 municipalities:

- Tadjenanet
- Ouled Khalouf
- Benyahia Abderrahmane
