= Bouhatem District =

- District
- Country: Algeria
- Province: Mila Province

Population (2008)
  - Total: 20,277
- Time zone: UTC+1 (CET)

Bouhatem District is a district of Mila Province, Algeria.

The district is further divided into 2 municipalities:

- Bouhatem
- Derrahi Bousselah
