= Tayeb Filali =

Algerian long-distance runner

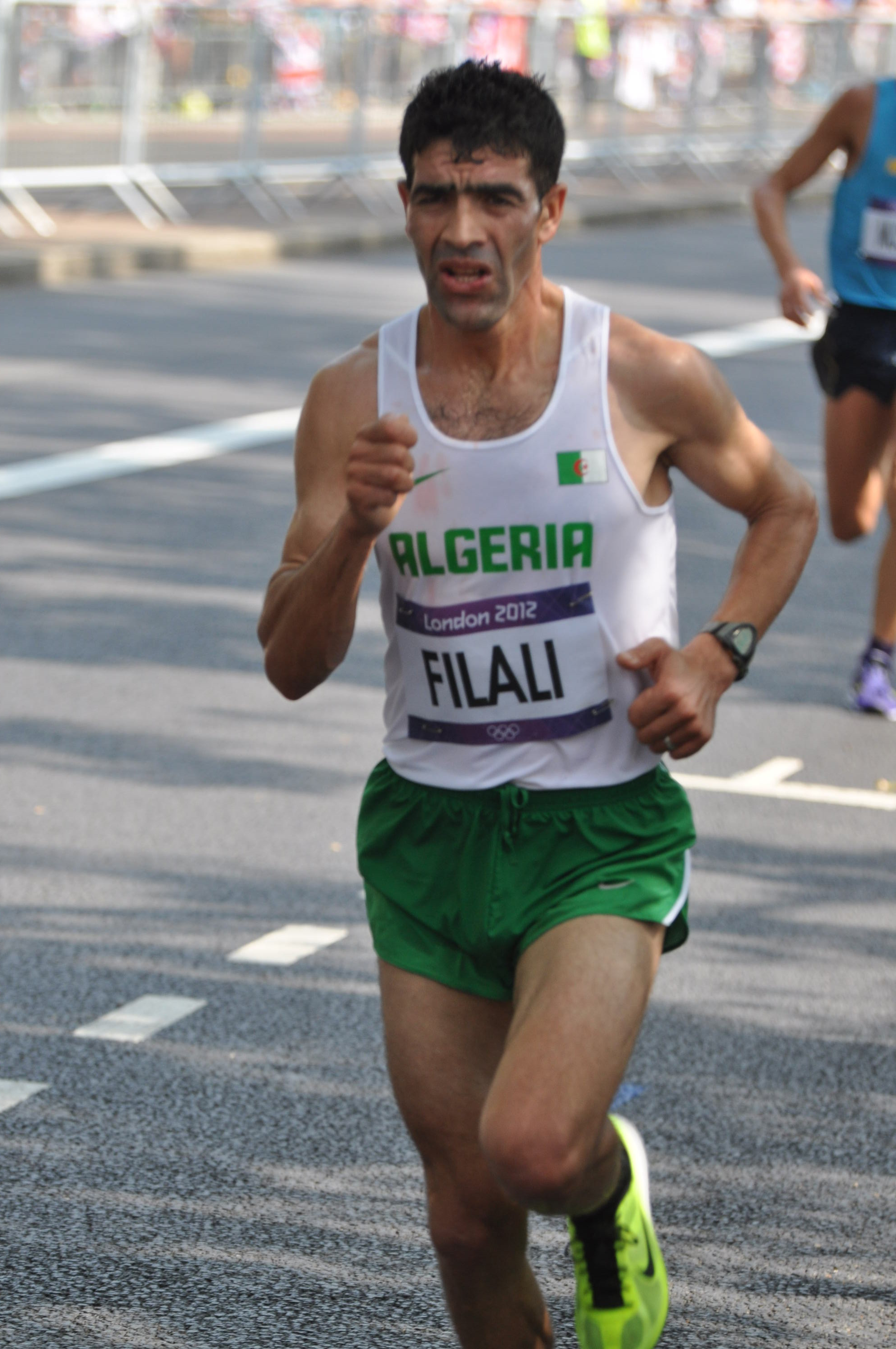
- Tayeb Filali in the marathon at the 2012 Summer Olympics in London

Personal information
- Born: January 16, 1979 (age 47) Grarem, Algeria
- Height: 1.72 m (5 ft 7 1/2 in)
- Weight: 55 kg (121 lb)

Sport
- Country: Algeria
- Sport: Athletics
- Event: Marathon

Tayeb Filali (born 16 January 1979) is an Algerian long-distance runner. At the 2012 Summer Olympics, he competed in the Men's marathon, but did not finish.
