= Orcivia gens =

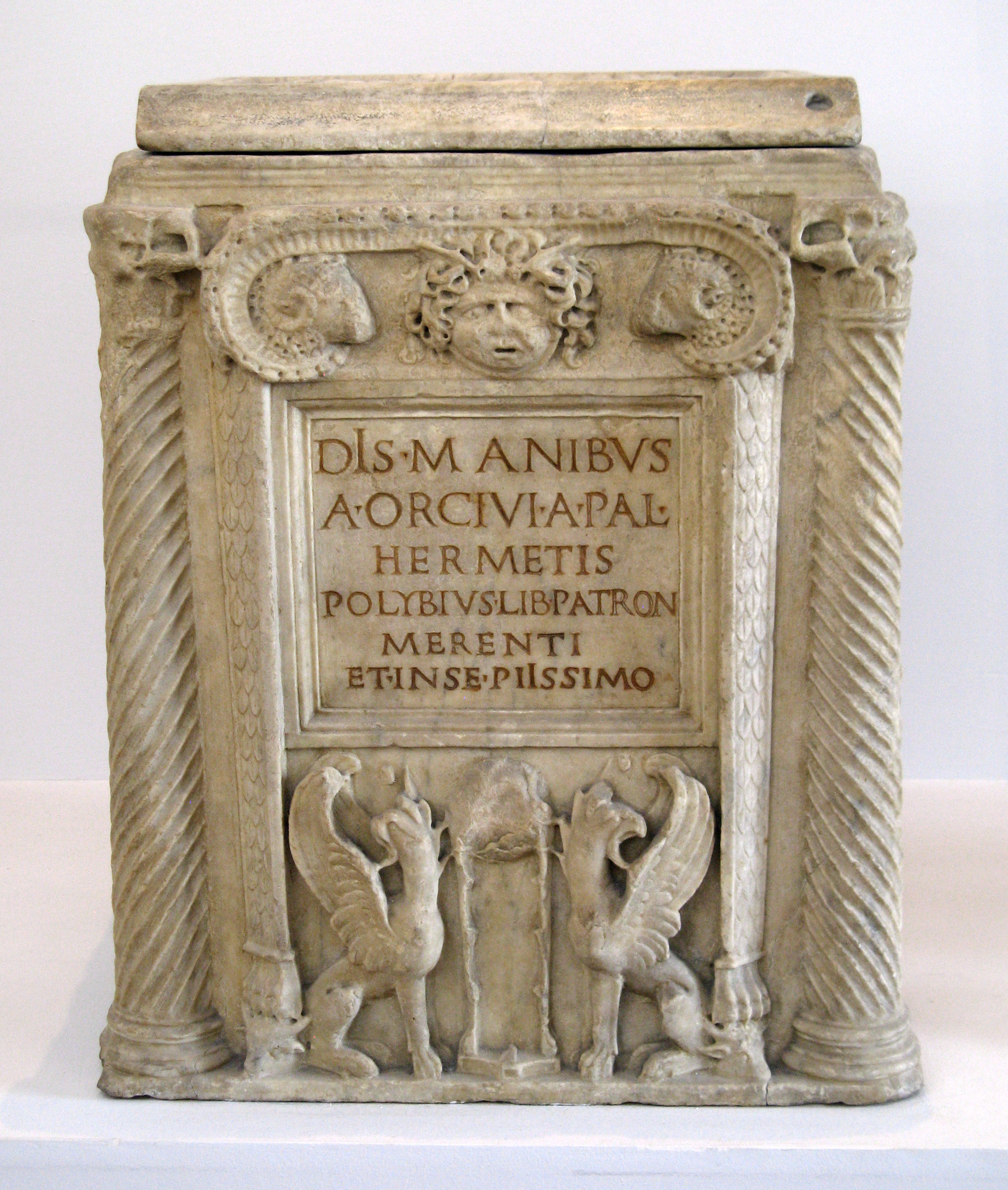
Cinerary urn of Aulus Orcivius Hermes, from Rome (now in the National Archaeological Museum of Venice)

The gens Orcivia, also written Orcevia and Orchivia, was a minor plebeian family at Rome. Few of them achieved any prominence in the Roman state, but many are known from inscriptions.

== Origin ==
The nomen Orcivius belongs to a class of gentilicia believed to be of Sabine or Oscan origin, formed from other names using less common suffixes, in this case -ivius, which never became regular elements of Roman nomina. The name may have been formed from the nomen Orchius or Orcius. Most of the Orcivii found in inscriptions are concentrated at Praeneste in Latium, at Rome and Ostia, and in the provinces of Venetia and Histria, Africa Proconsularis, and Numidia. By far, the greatest number are from Praeneste, suggesting that it was the ancestral home of the Orcivii.

== Praenomina ==
The main praenomina of the Orcivii were Marcus, Gaius, and Lucius, the three most common names throughout Roman history. Other praenomina occur infrequently among the known members of the family, including Quintus, Publius, Gnaeus, and Aulus, all of which were also very common names. The Orchivii also supply an example of the common feminine praenomen Maio.

== Members ==
This list includes abbreviated praenomina. For an explanation of this practice, see filiation.

- Gaius Orcivius, (Note: Or Orchivius.) praetor in 66 BC, the year in which Cicero also held the praetorship. He presided over cases of peculatus. (Note: Peculatus was the crime of misappropriating public funds or property.) According to Cicero's brother, Quintus, he was susceptible to flattery.
- Orcevia, wife of Numerius, dedicated a gift to Fortuna at Praeneste.
- Orchivia, perhaps the daughter of Gaius Orchivius Eros, named in a sepulchral inscription at Rome.
- Orchivia, buried at Bkira in Numidia, aged five.
- Orcivia, wife of Anthidius, buried at Rome.
- Orcivia, a freedwoman, buried at Rome.
- Orcivia, buried at Carthago in Africa Proconsularis.
- Orcevia, named in an inscription from Praeneste.
- Orcevius, the master of Rodo, a slave appointed to serve as one of the cooks for the priests of the temple of Fortuna at Praeneste.
- Orcivius, dedicated a sepulchre at Pola in the province of Venetia and Histria to his brother, his father, and his mother, Flavia Hostilia.
- Orcivius, a freedman buried at Pola.
- Gaius Orchivius, perhaps the son of Gaius Orchivius Eros, named in a sepulchral inscription from Rome.
- Gaius Orcivius, the master of Licinus, a slave appointed to wait upon the magistrates of Praeneste.
- Gaius Orcivius, the master of Albinus, a slave appointed to serve the butchers' guild at Praeneste.
- Gaius Orcevius M. f., named in an inscription at Praeneste.
- Gaius Orcevius M. f., one of the censors of Praeneste.
- Lucius Orchivius L. l., a freedman named in a sepulchral inscription from Rome.
- Lucius Orcevius, one of the praetors of Praeneste.
- Lucius Orcivius L. f., buried at Rome, aged six.
- Lucius Orcivius C. f., named in an inscription from Praeneste.
- Maio Orcevia M. f., named in an inscription from Praeneste.
- Marcus Orcevius, named in two inscriptions from Praeneste.
- Marcus Orcevius M. f., named in an inscription from Praeneste.
- Marcus Orcivius, named in a sepulchral inscription from Ostia.
- Marcus Orcivius M. f., named in an inscription at Praeneste.
- Marcus Orcivius M. f., named in an inscription from Praeneste.
- Marcus Orcivius, the master of Pilonicus, a slave mentioned in an inscription from Praeneste.
- Quintus Orcivius Q. l., a freedman mentioned in an inscription at Praeneste.
- Marcus Orcivius Abscantus, named in a sepulchral inscription from Ostia.
- (Orchivius) Alexander, perhaps the son of Gaius Orchivius Eros, named in a sepulchral inscription from Rome.
- Gaius Orchivius Amemptus, the son of Amemptus, an imperial dispensator (Note: A master of the household.) in the time of Augustus, and his wife, Orchivia Phoebe, was buried at Rome, aged eighteen. According to his funerary inscription, he was a decurion, in this case probably a junior cavalry officer.
- Orchivia L. l. Apame, a freedwoman named in a sepulchral inscription from Rome.
- Marcus Orcivius Aspasius, named in a sepulchral inscription from Ostia.
- Gaius Orchivius Blandus, buried at Rome, aged thirty.
- Orcivia Casta, buried at Thuburbo Maius in Africa Proconsularis, aged twenty.
- Orchivia Damalis, buried at Rome.
- Orcivia Delphis, buried at Rome, aged eighteen years, five months, and four days.
- Marcus Orcivius Demetrius, named in a sepulchral inscription from Ostia.
- Gnaeus Orchivius Dio, a freedman buried at Ficana in Latium.
- Gaius Orchivius Eros, named in a sepulchral inscription from Rome, was probably the father of Gaius Orchivius, Alexander, Orchivia, and Saturnina, named in the same inscription.
- Lucius Orchivius L. l. Eros, a freedman named in a sepulchral inscription from Rome.
- Gaius Orchivius Faustinus, buried at Gens Suburburum Colonorum in Numidia, aged fifty.
- Marcus Orcivius Faustus, named in a sepulchral inscription from Ostia.
- Marcus Orcivius Felix, named in a sepulchral inscription from Ostia.
- Orcivia Fortunata, buried at Rome, aged thirty-eight.
- Marcus Orcivius Fortunatus, named in a sepulchral inscription from Ostia.
- Publius Orcivius C. f. Fronto, husband of Vettidia Maxsuma, and father of Orcivia Quarta, buried at Pola.
- Aulus Orcivius A. f. Hermes, buried at Rome.
- Orchivia L. l. Heta, a freedwoman named in a sepulchral inscription from Rome.
- Marcus Orchivius M. l. Hilario, a freedman named in a funerary inscription from Rome.
- Orcivia M. l. Hospita, a freedwoman buried at Rome.
- Marcus Orcivius Januarius, named in a sepulchral inscription from Ostia.
- Orcivia Marcella, named in a funerary inscription from Verona in Venetia and Histria.
- Lucius Orcivius Maritalis, one of the municipal Decurions at Rome, named in an inscription dating to the reign of Maxentius, AD 306 to 312.
- Orchivia Monnica, buried at Gens Suburburum Colonorum, aged fifty-six.
- Orchivia Mustia, buried at Gens Suburburum Colonorum, aged thirty-five.
- Gaius Orchivius Namphamus, husband of Varenia Marina, buried at Gens Suburburum Colonorum, aged sixty-six.
- Orcevius M. f. Nasica, named in an inscription from Praeneste.
- Orcivia Nigela, named in a libationary inscription from Verona.
- Gaius Orcivius C. l. Optatus, a freedman named in an inscription from Pola.
- Gaius Orchivius Paulinus, a flamen at Diana Veteranorum in Numidia.
- Orchivia Phoebe, the wife of Amemptus, an imperial dispensator in the time of Augustus, and mother of Gaius Orchivius Amemptus, a decurion who died at the age of eighteen, and to whom she dedicated a monument at Rome.
- Orcivius Primus, buried at Cuicul in Numidia, aged ten.
- Marcus Orchivius M. f. Priscus, named in a funerary inscription from Rome.
- Orchivia Procula, buried at Rome.
- Orcivius Pultarius, buried at Cirta in Numidia, aged eleven.
- Gaius Orcivius Pusincinus, buried at Cirta, aged seventy-one.
- Orcivia P. f. C. n. Quarta, daughter of Publius Orcivius Fronto and Vettidia Maxsuma, buried at Pola.
- Gaius Orcivius Restitutus, buried at Pola.
- Marcus Orcivius Restitutus, named in a sepulchral inscription from Ostia.
- Quintus Orcivius Rex, named in an inscription from Praeneste.
- (Orchivia) Saturnina, perhaps the daughter of Gaius Orchivius Eros, named in a sepulchral inscription from Rome.
- Gaius Orcivius Saufeius, a man of praetorian rank, named in a dedicatory inscription from Praeneste.
- Marcus Orcivius Stephanio, named in a sepulchral inscription from Ostia.
- Lucius Orchivius L. l. Stephanus, a freedman named in a sepulchral inscription from Rome.
- Orchivia L. f. Teria, buried at Saldae, aged thirty.
- Orchivia L. l. Thaïs, named in an inscription from Rome.
- Orchivia Urbana, buried at Cirta.
- Lucius Orcivius L. f. Vapidus, named in an inscription at Praeneste.
- Gaius Orcivius Zmaragdus, husband of Annia Prisca, who dedicated a monument at Rome to him and to her mother, Annia.
- Lucius Aulius Orcivius, named in an inscription from Praeneste.

== See also ==
- List of Roman gentes

== Bibliography ==
- Marcus Tullius Cicero, Pro Cluentio.
- Quintus Tullius Cicero, De Petitione Consulatus (attributed).
- Johann Caspar von Orelli, Onomasticon Tullianum, Orell Füssli, Zürich (1826–1838).
- Dictionary of Greek and Roman Biography and Mythology, William Smith, ed., Little, Brown and Company, Boston (1849).
- Theodor Mommsen et alii, Corpus Inscriptionum Latinarum (The Body of Latin Inscriptions, abbreviated CIL), Berlin-Brandenburgische Akademie der Wissenschaften (1853–present).
- Wilhelm Henzen, Ephemeris Epigraphica: Corporis Inscriptionum Latinarum Supplementum (Journal of Inscriptions: Supplement to the Corpus Inscriptionum Latinarum, abbreviated EE), Institute of Roman Archaeology, Rome (1872–1913).
- Notizie degli Scavi di Antichità (News of Excavations from Antiquity, abbreviated NSA), Accademia dei Lincei (1876–present).
- René Cagnat et alii, L'Année épigraphique (The Year in Epigraphy, abbreviated AE), Presses Universitaires de France (1888–present).
- Stéphane Gsell, Inscriptions Latines de L'Algérie (Latin Inscriptions from Algeria, abbreviated ILAlg), Edouard Champion, Paris (1922–present).
- Inscriptiones Italiae (Inscriptions from Italy, abbreviated InscrIt), Rome (1931-present).
- T. Robert S. Broughton, The Magistrates of the Roman Republic, American Philological Association (1952).
- Attilio Degrassi, Inscriptiones Latinae Liberae Rei Publicae (Latin Inscriptions from the Roman Republic, abbreviated ILLRP), Florence (1965).
- Annalisa Franchi de Bellis, I cippi prenestini (The Grave Markers of Praeneste, abbreviated Cippi), Urbino (1997).
