= Kabylia =

Region in northern Algeria

Kabylia Tamurt n leqbayel ⵜⴰⵎⵓⵔⵜ ⵏ ⵍⴻⵇⴱⴰⵢⴻⵍ بلد القبائل
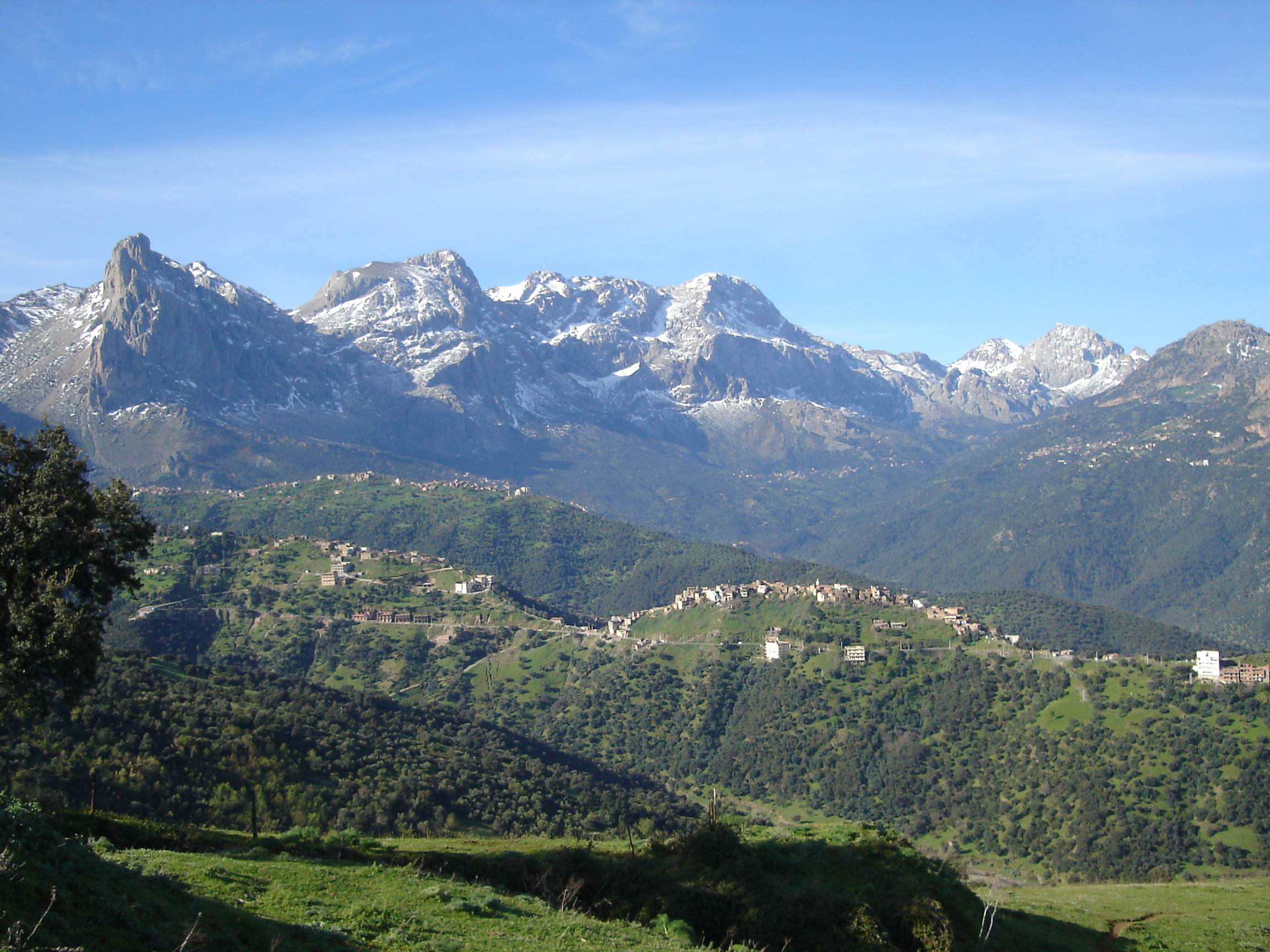
- View of the Djurdjura National Park

- Location of Kabylia in central Algeria (northwestern Africa)
- Coordinates: 36.8°N 4.3°E
- Region: Algeria
- Provinces – Wilayas: List: Tizi Ouzou, Boumerdes, Bouira, Setif, Bordj Bou Arreridj, Jijel, Béjaïa, Mila and Skikda

Area
  - Total: 25,000 km^{2} (9,700 sq mi)

Population (2012)
  - Total: 3,450,000
  - Density: 140/km^{2} (360/sq mi)
- Demonym: Kabyles
- Time zone: UTC+1
  - Summer (DST): UTC+1 (CEST)
- Languages: Kabyle; Arabic; French

Kabylia (also spelled Kabylie; /kəˈbɪliə/; Kabyle: Tamurt n leqbayel; in Tifinagh: ⵜⴰⵎⵓⵔⵜ ⵏ ⵍⴻⵇⴱⴰⵢⴻⵍ; Arabic: منطقة القبائل, lit. 'Area of the Tribes') is a mountainous coastal region in northern Algeria and the homeland of the Kabyle people. It is part of the Tell Atlas mountain range and is located at the edge of the Mediterranean.

Kabylia or "the Kabylias," covers, totally or partially, nine provinces of Algeria: Tizi Ouzou, Boumerdes, Bouira, Setif, Bordj Bou Arreridj, Jijel, Béjaïa, Mila and Skikda. Gouraya National Park and Djurdjura National Park are also located in Kabylia.

== Name ==
The name Kabylia comes from the Kabyle Berbers who inhabit the region. The word Kabyle itself is derived from the Arabic qaba'il (قبائل), meaning 'tribes'. During French colonial rule, the term was used to refer to the region's tribal groups and gradually became established as a regional name.

== History ==
Topographic map of Kabylia.

=== Antiquity ===
The area of modern-day Kabylia was a part of the Kingdom of Numidia (202 BC – 46 BC).

=== Middle Ages ===
The history of the area encompassing Kabylia started to appear in the classical books during the fourth century AD with the revolt of the commander Firmus and his brother Guildon against the empire.

The Vandals, a Germanic people, established a kingdom in North Africa in 435. Their rule lasted for 99 years until they were conquered by the Byzantine Empire in 534. The surviving Vandals then assimilated into the native Berber population. During the rule of the Romans, Vandals and Byzantines, the Kabyle people were some of the few Imazighen in North Africa who remained independent. During the Arab conquest of North Africa, the Kabyles were able to temporarily control and possess their mountains, It was not until 1857 that Kabylia as a whole was fully and entirely conquered and subdued by France.

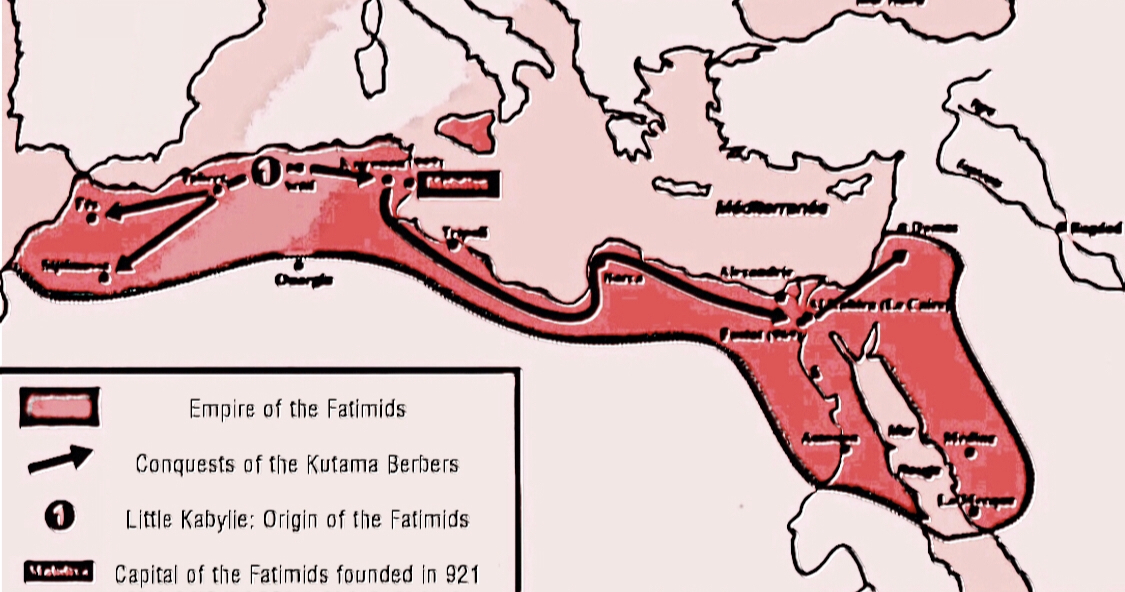
Origin and conquests of the Fatimids

Between 902 and 909 AD, after being converted to Isma'ilism and won over by Abu Abdallah's dawah, the Kutama Berbers from present-day Little Kabylie helped contribute to the founding of the Fatimid Caliphate, whose support in the overthrowing of the Aghlabids of Ifriqiya resulted in the creation of the Caliphate, although the ruling Fatimid dynasty was Arab. After taking control of Ifriqiya, the Fatimids conquered the realm of the Rustamids on the way to Sijilmasa which they also briefly conquered. There the imprisoned Abdullāh al-Mahdī Billah was freed, accepted as the Imam of the movement, and installed as the first Caliph and founder of the ruling dynasty. The historian Heinz Halm describes the early Fatimid state as being "a hegemony of the Kutama and Sanhaja Berbers over the eastern and central Maghrib" and Loimeier states that rebellions against the Fatimids were also expressed through protest and opposition to Kutama rule. The weakening of the Abbasids allowed Fatimid-Kutama power to quickly expand and in 959 Ziri ibn Manad, Jawhar the Sicilian and a Kutama army conquered Fez and Sijilmassa in Morocco. During the reign of al-Aziz Billah, the role of the Kutama in the Fatimid army was greatly weakened as he significantly reduced their size in the army and included new socio-military groups. In 969 under the command of Jawhar, the Fatimid troops conquered Egypt from the Ikhsidids, the general Ja'far ibn Fallah was instrumental in this success: he led the troops that crossed the river Nile and according to al-Maqrizi, captured the boats used to do this from a fleet sent by Ikhshidid loyalists from Lower Egypt. The general Ja’far then invaded Palestine and conquered Ramla, the capital, he then conquered Damascus and made himself the master of the city and then he moved north and conquered Tripoli. It was around this time period that the Fatimid Caliphate reached its territorial peak of 4,100,000 km2.

A Berber family emerged as formidable leaders in the unique Berber form of elected delegates form of government (through financial contribution and thus influence), the Zirid dynastys. Beyond their immediate Zirid territory (aarch/Congregation), another aarch and family Hammadid and its associates emerged in present-day Kabylia with influence covering most of today's Algeria, whereas the Zirid's territory extended eastward to cover the area of modern Tunisia. Both the Hammadid and [Zirid dynasty empires as well as the Fatimids established their rule in the Maghreb countries. The Zirids ruled land in what is now Algeria, Tunisia, Morocco, Libya, Spain, Malta and Italy. The Hammadids captured and held important regions such as Ouargla, Constantine, Sfax, Susa, Algiers, Tripoli and Fez establishing their rule in every country in the Maghreb region. The Fatimids conquered all of North Africa as well as Sicily and parts of the Middle East.

=== French colonisation and resistance ===
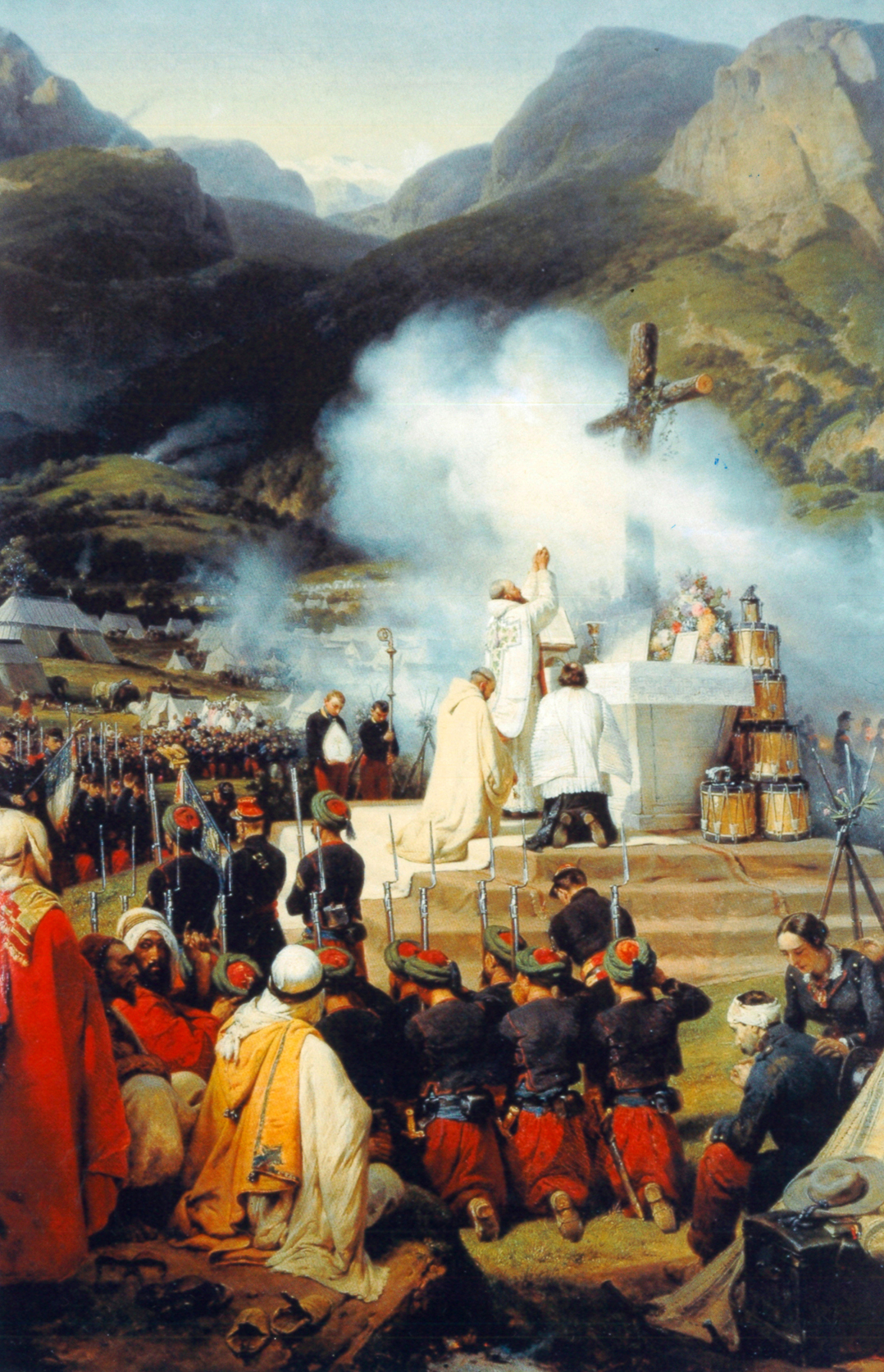
First mass in Kabylia during the French conquest of Algeria, 1837

Though the region was the last stronghold against French colonization, the area was gradually taken over by the French after 1830, despite vigorous local resistance by the local population led by leaders such as Faḍma n Sumer and Cheikh Mokrani, until the Battle of Icheriden in 1857 marked a decisive French victory, with sporadic outbursts of violence continuing as late as Mokrani's rebellion in 1871. Much land was confiscated in this period from the more recalcitrant tribes and given to French pieds-noirs. Many arrests and deportations were carried out by the French in response to uprisings, mainly to New Caledonia (hence the origins of the Algerians of the Pacific.) Colonization also resulted in an acceleration of the emigration into other areas of the country and outside of it.

Algerian migrant workers in France organized the first party promoting independence in the 1920s. Messali Hadj, Imache Amar, Si Djilani, and Belkacem Radjef rapidly built a strong following throughout France and Algeria in the 1930s and actively trained militants who became key players during the struggle for independence and in building an independent Algerian state.

French colonists invented the Kabyle myth in the 19th century which asserted that the Kabyle people were more predisposed than Arabs to assimilate into "French civilization." Lacoste explained that "turning the Arabs into invaders was one way of legitimizing the French presence". Prior to the creation of the term in the 1840s, Kabyles throughout the centuries were actively and fully a part of the Moorish Islamic culture of Algeria.

=== In the Algerian War ===
Wilaya III also played an important role in military operations and in coordination with other ALN units. In a report presented to the National Council of the Algerian Revolution (CNRA) in 1957, Abane Ramdane estimated its strength at approximately 12,000 men. This figure illustrates the military importance attributed to the region by the FLN leadership, although it remains an estimate from that period.

From 1959 onwards, Kabylia became one of the main theatres of General Maurice Challe's military strategy. Operation Jumelles, launched on 22 July 1959 as part of the Challe Plan, deployed substantial military resources to dismantle the political and military organisation of Wilaya III and weaken the ALN's armed groups. The operations continued until the spring of 1960. According to Sylvain Bartet, the offensive resulted in the loss of approximately half of Wilaya III's military potential.

Kabylia therefore constituted one of the major centres of the Algerian War of Independence, owing to the early establishment of the nationalist movement in the region, its role in the political organisation of the FLN, the holding of the Soummam Congress and the scale of the fighting against French forces.

During the War of Independence (1954–1962), the FLN and ALN's reorganisation of the country created, for the first time, a unified Kabyle administrative territory, wilaya III, being as it was at the centre of the anti-colonial struggle. It was one of the most affected areas because of the importance of the maquis (aided by the mountainous terrain) and the high levels of support and collaboration of its inhabitants for the nationalist cause. Several historic leaders of the FLN came from this region, including Hocine Aït Ahmed, Abane Ramdane, and Krim Belkacem. It was also in Kabylia that the Soummam conference took place in 1956, the first of the FLN. The flipside of being such a critical region for the independence movement was being one of the major target of French counter-insurgency operations, not least the devastation of agricultural lands, looting, destruction of villages, population displacement, the creation of forbidden zones, etc.

=== After independence ===
From the moment of independence, tensions had already developed between Kabyle leaders and the central government, with the Socialist Forces Front (FFS) party of Hocine Aït Ahmed, strong in wilayas III and IV (Kabylie and Algiers), opposing the FLN's Political Bureau centred around the person of Ahmed Ben Bella, who in turn relied upon the forces of the border army group within the ALN commanded by Houari Boumediene. The Provisional Government of the Algerian Republic (based in Tizi Ouzou) was defeated by the Oujda Group led by Ahmed Ben Bella in the 1962 Algerian crisis. As early as 1963 the FFS called into question the authority of the single-party system, which resulted in two years of armed confrontation in the region. The rebellion was defeated, leaving more than four hundred dead, and most of the FLN leaders from Kabylia and the eastern provinces either executed or forced into exile.

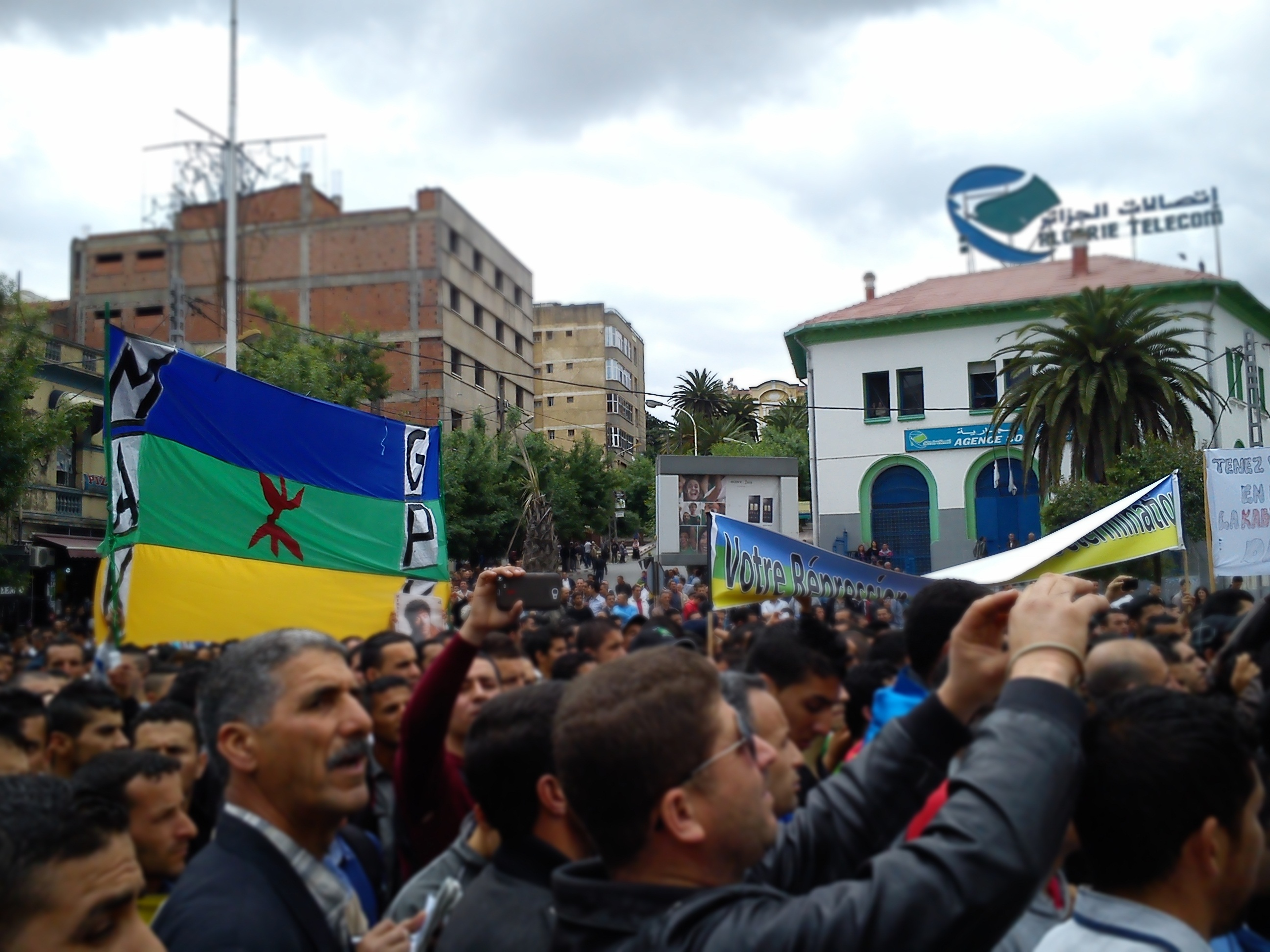
Demonstration by Kabyles in 2014

In April 1980, following the banning of a conference by writer Mouloud Mammeri on traditional Kabyle poetry, riots and strikes broke out in Tizi Ouzou, followed by several months of demonstrations on university campuses in Kabylia and Algiers, known as the Berber Spring, demanding the officialisation and recognition of the Tamazight language. These resulted in the extrajudicial imprisonment of thousands of Kabyle intellectuals, along with other clashes in Tizi-Ouzou and Algiers in 1984 and 1985. With the opening up and establishment of the multi-party system in 1989, the RCD (Rally for Culture and Democracy) party was created by Saïd Sadi, at the same time as identity politics and the cultural awakening of the Kabyles were intensifying in reaction to the increasingly hard-line Arabization. In the midst of the civil war, there was an act of massive civil disobedience beginning in September 1994 and lasting the entire school year until mid 1995 where the ten-million strong population of Kabylia conducted a total school boycott, known as the "schoolbag strike". In June and July 1998 the region flared up again after the assassination of protest singer and political activist Lounès Matoub at the same time that a law requiring the use of Arabic in all fields of education entered into force, further worsening tensions.

Following the death in April 2001 of Massinissa Guermah, a young high school student, in police custody, major riots took place, known as the Black Spring, in which 123 people died and some two thousand were wounded as a result of the authorities' violent crackdown. Eventually, the government was compelled to negotiate with the Arouch, a confederation of ancestral local councils over the situation, alongside wider issues such as social justice and the economy, which was deemed by the government as 'regionalist' and dangerous for national unity and cohesion. Nevertheless, Tamazight was recognised in 2002 as a national language of Algeria, and as of 7 February 2016, an official language of the State alongside Arabic.

The Movement for the Autonomy of Kabylie (MAK), founded in June 2001, has called for self-government for the region since 2011. The MAK was renamed as "Mouvement pour l'Autodétermination de la Kabylie" seeking independence from Algeria.

== Geography ==
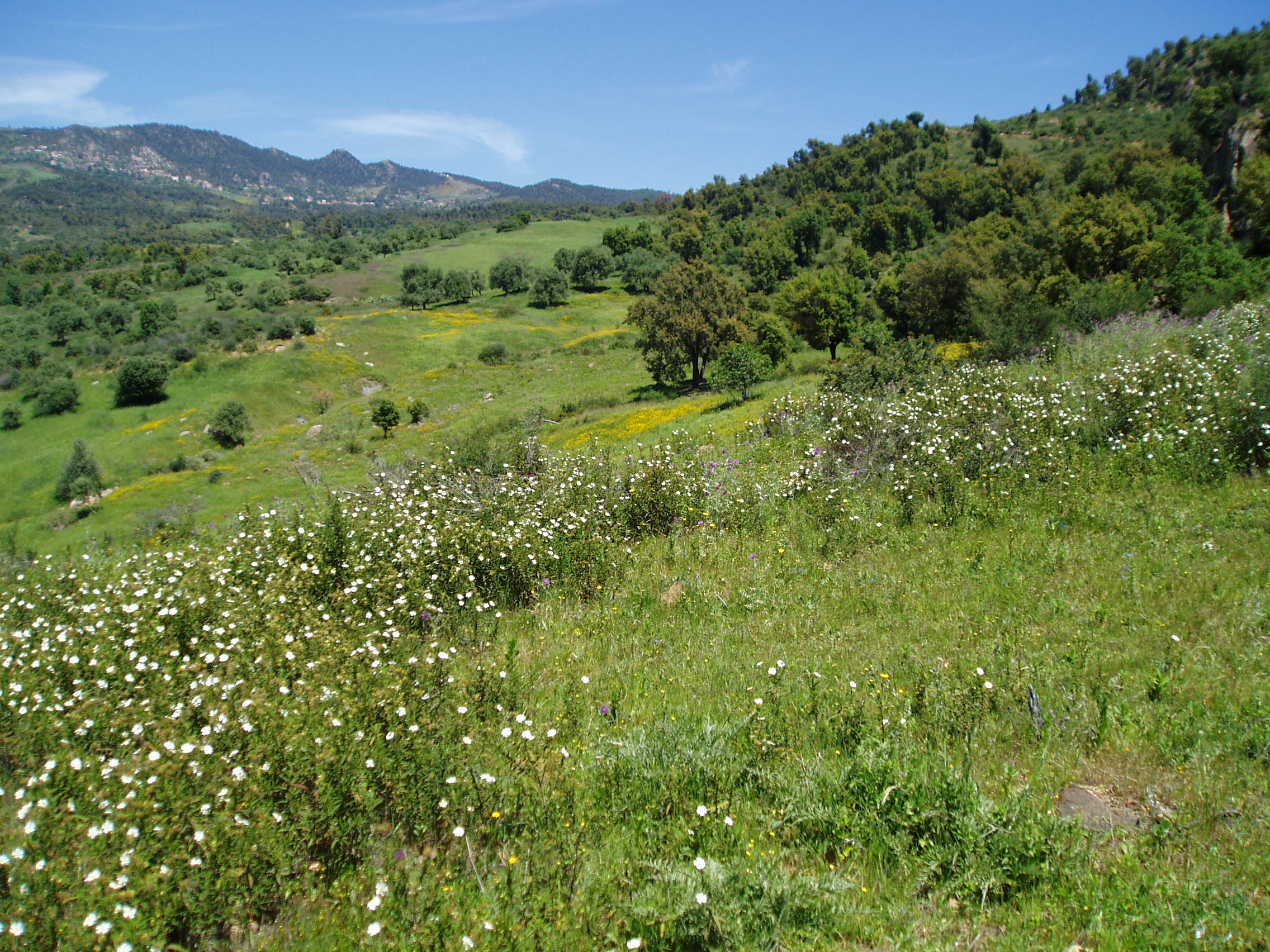
Landscape near Azazga

Main features:

- Greater Kabylia, which runs from Thénia (west) to Béjaïa (east), and from the Mediterranean Sea (north) to the Soummam Valley (south), that is to say, 200 km by 100 km, beginning 50 km from Algiers, the capital of Algeria.
- Lesser Kabylia, comprising Kabylia of Bibans and Kabylia of Babors.

Three large chains of mountains occupy most of the area:

- In the north, the mountain range of maritime Kabylia, culminating with Tifrit n'Ait El Hadj (Tamgout 1278 m)
- In the south, the Djurdjura, dominating the valley of Soummam, culminating with Lalla Khedidja (2308 m)
- Between the two lies the mountain range of Agawa, which is the most populous and is 800 m high on average. The largest town of Great Kabylia, Tizi Ouzou, lies in that mountain range. At Iraten (formerly "Fort-National" in French occupation), which numbered 28,000 inhabitants in 2001, is the highest urban centre of the area.

== Ecology ==
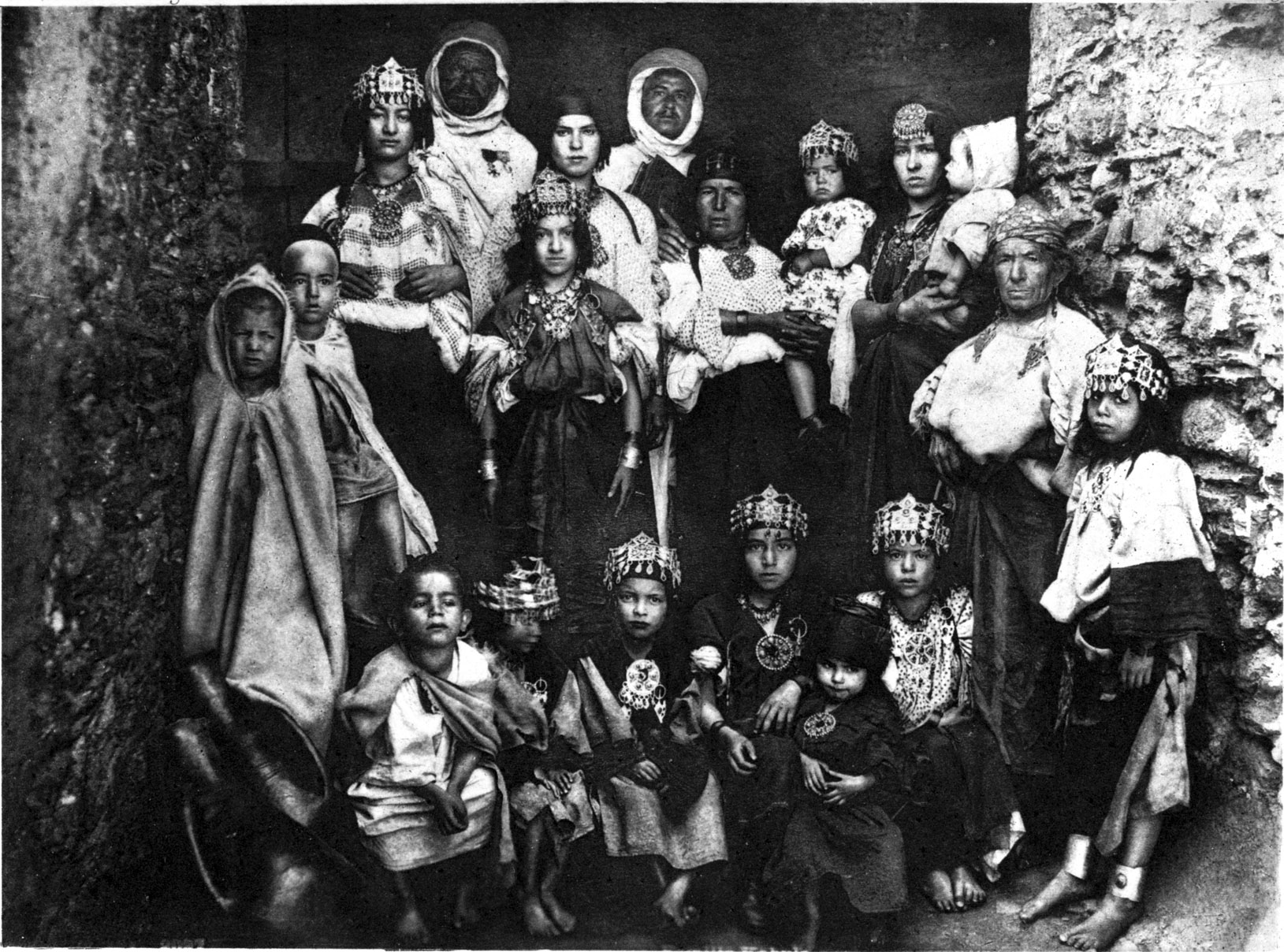
Kabyles

There are a number of flora and fauna associated with this region. Notable is a population of the endangered primate, Barbary macaque, Macaca sylvanus, whose prehistoric range encompassed a much wider span than the present limited populations in Algeria, Morocco and Gibraltar.

== Population ==
The area is populated by Kabyles, a Berber ethnic group. They speak the Kabyle language, the largest Berber language in Algeria. It is spoken by 3 million people.

Since the Berber Spring in 1980, Kabyles have been at the forefront of the fight for recognition of the Berber as an official language in Algeria (see Languages of Algeria).

=== Linguistic situation and developments ===
Overview map of linguistic areas in northeastern Algeria, from the mid-19th century to the mid-20th century.

The Kabyles are part of the Berbers (Imazighen). Their language, Kabyle (Taqbaylit)—spoken by the vast majority of the population—is a variety of Berber (Tamazight).

In Greater Kabylia and in the part of Lesser Kabylia where Kabyle predominates, it is the mother tongue and language of daily life for almost the entire population. Where Kabyle- and Arabic-speaking populations come into contact, Kabyle-Algerian Arabic bilingualism is practiced on both sides. In Béjaïa and Tizi Ouzou, where the traditional urban population was predominantly Arabic-speaking, the rural exodus following independence led to the widespread adoption of Kabyle. As for Standard Arabic, its use is confined to the education system and central government administration. In practice, French is the language used for written or scholarly purposes and, almost exclusively, in commerce and advertising.

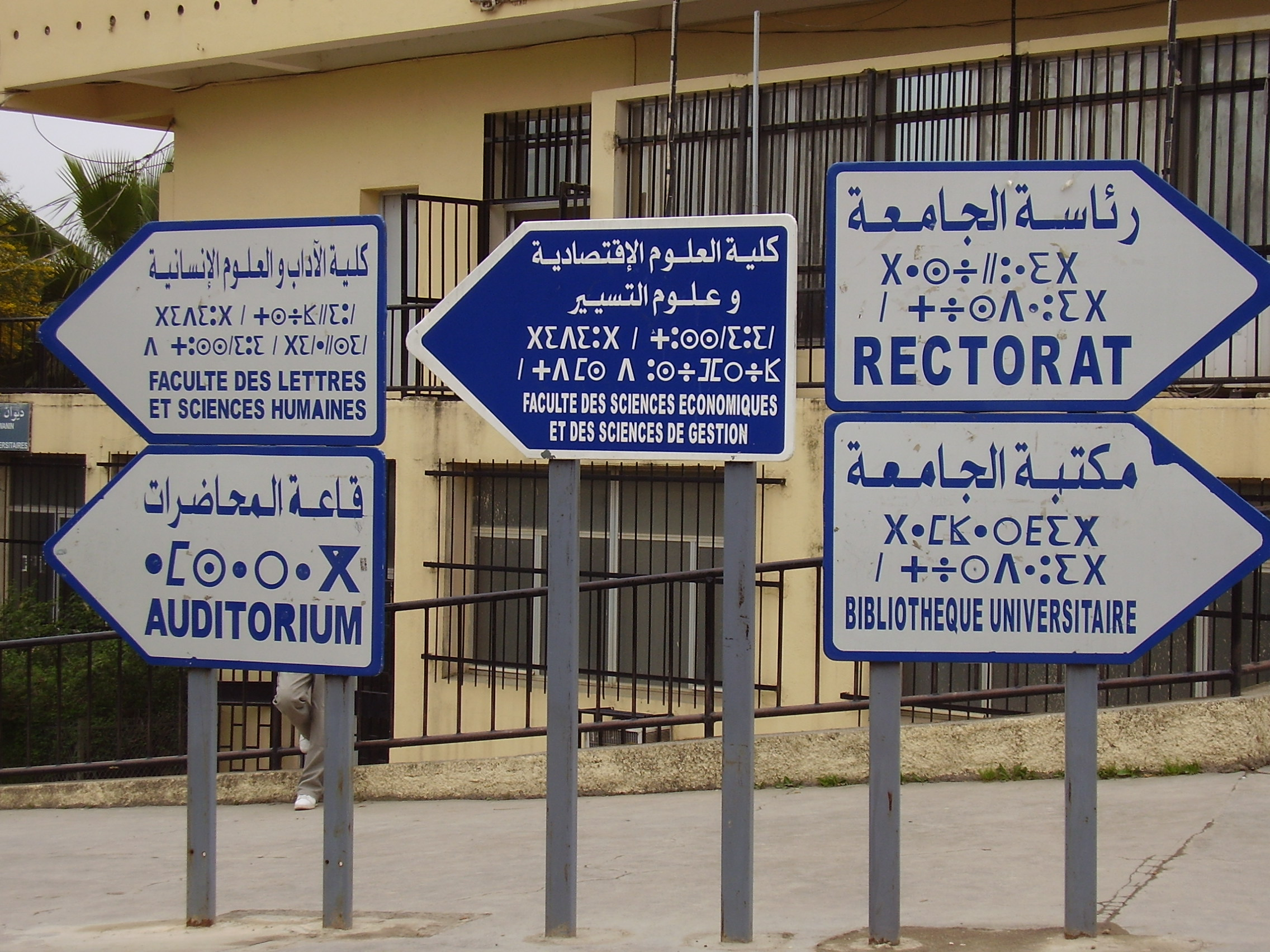
Trilingual signage at the Tizi-Ouzou faculty.

While the Greater Kabylia region has few native Arabic speakers, Lower and Little Kabylia have undergone greater Arabization. In Lower Kabylia, Arabization dates back to the Ottoman period. During that time, lands in the region were granted to a few families of Turkish or Arab origin, as well as to the Iamriwen tribe—a group composed of adventurers and outcasts from other Kabyle tribes. Along with the responsibility of guarding and cultivating the lowland plains, they received a horse from their patrons, with the mandate to keep neighboring populations in check. Their control extended as far as Upper Kabylia, covering the entire middle Sebaou Valley; there, just as in the low-lying plains, the "Makhzen" proved to be a powerful agent of Arabization. However, these territories have since experienced a partial re-Kabylization.

In Little Kabylia, Kabyle was still predominantly spoken during the 19th century, extending even beyond the Oued El Kebir. While Jijel and its surrounding areas had already undergone Arabization, there was no territorial break between the Kabyle and Chaoui dialects further inland. Today, the Guergour region is half-Arabophone, while Ferdjioua is entirely so. To the east, the term Kabyles el hadra emerged in the 18th century to describe Arab-speaking highlanders from the northern Constantine region who had adopted urban culture and abandoned mountain life.

== Zawiyas ==
The Kabylia region is home to dozens of zawiyas affiliated with the Rahmaniyya Sufi brotherhood, including the following:

- Zawiya Thaalibia in the Issers.
- Zawiyet Sidi Boumerdassi in Tidjelabine.
- Zawiyet Sidi Boushaki in Thénia.
- Zawiyet Sidi Amar Cherif in Sidi Daoud.
- Zawiyet Sidi M'Hamed Saadi in Aafir.
- Zawiyet Sidi Ali Debbaghi in Beni Amrane.
- Zawiyet Sidi Ghobrini in Khemis El-Khechna.
- Zawiyet Sidi Salem in Boudouaou.

== Economy ==
The traditional economy of the area is based on arboriculture (orchards, olive trees) and on the craft industry (tapestry or pottery). The mountain and hill farming is gradually giving way to local industry (textile and agro-alimentary).

Today Kabylia is one of the most industrialised parts of Algeria. Kabylia produces less than 15% of Algerian GDP (excluding oil and gas). Industries include: pharmaceutical industry in Bgayet Béjaïa, agro-alimentary in Ifri and Akbou, mechanical industry in Tizi Ouzou and other small towns of western Kabylia, and petrochemical industry and oil refining in Bgayet Béjaïa.

Bgayet (Béjaïa)'s port is the second biggest in Algeria after Algiers, and the 6th largest on the Mediterranean Sea.

== See also ==
- JS Kabylie
- Kabylia football team
- Corso Valley
