= Yacine Bezzaz =

Algerian footballer (born 1981)

Personal information
- Date of birth: 10 July 1981 (age 45)
- Place of birth: Grarem Gouga, Algeria
- Height: 1.79 m (5 ft 10 in)
- Position: Winger

Youth career
- 1992–1999: NRB Grarem

Senior career*
Years	Team	Apps	(Gls)
1999–2001	CS Constantine	23	(4)
2001–2002	JS Kabylie	25	(4)
2002–2005	Ajaccio	24	(2)
2005–2009	Valenciennes	61	(3)
2009–2010	Strasbourg	23	(2)
2010–2011	Troyes	23	(0)
2011–2012	USM Alger	11	(0)
2012–2014	CS Constantine	52	(10)
2014–2015	MC Oran	29	(2)
2015–2018	CS Constantine	62	(10)
2018–2019	MC El Eulma	21	(2)

International career
2000	Algeria U20	2	(1)
2001	Algeria U23	2	(0)
2001–2013	Algeria	23	(3)
Medal record
JS Kabylie
Winner	CAF Cup	2001
- * Club domestic league appearances and goals

Yacine Bezzaz (Arabic: ياسين بزاز; born 10 July 1981) is an Algerian former professional footballer who played as a winger. He is the nephew of French-Algerian former football player and manager Moussa Bezaz.

== Club career ==
Bezzaz was born in Grarem Gouga. On 28 July 2011, he reached an agreement to terminate his contract with Troyes. Two days later, he signed a two-year contract with USM Alger.

== Career statistics ==
=== Club ===
Appearances and goals by club, season and competition
Club	Season	League			National cup (Note: Includes Algerian Cup, Coupe de France.)		League cup (Note: Includes Coupe de la Ligue.)		Total	
Club	Season	Division	Apps	Goals	Apps	Goals	Apps	Goals	Apps	Goals
CS Constantine	1999–2000	Algerian Division 2								
CS Constantine	2000–01	Algerian Division 1					—			
JS Kabylie	2001–02	Algerian Division 1	25	4						
Ajaccio	2002–03	Ligue 1	7	2			0	0	7	2
Ajaccio	2003–04	Ligue 1	5	0	0	0	0	0	5	0
Ajaccio	2004–05	Ligue 1	12	0	0	0	1	0	13	0
Ajaccio	Total		24	2	0	0	1	0	25	2
Valenciennes	2005–06	Ligue 2	16	0	0	0	0	0	16	0
Valenciennes	2006–07	Ligue 1	20	2	0	0	0	0	20	2
Valenciennes	2007–08	Ligue 1	20	1	0	0	0	0	20	1
Valenciennes	2008–09	Ligue 1	5	0	0	0	1	0	6	0
Valenciennes	Total		61	3	0	0	1	0	62	3
Strasbourg	2008–09	Ligue 2	9	1	0	0	1	0	10	1
Strasbourg	2009–10	Ligue 2	14	1	1	1	1	0	16	2
Strasbourg	Total		23	2	1	1	2	0	26	3
Troyes	2010–11	Ligue 2	23	0	2	2	0	0	25	2
USM Alger	2011–12	Algerian Ligue 1	11	0	1	0	0	0	12	0
CS Constantine	2011–12	Algerian Ligue 1	1	0	0	0	0	0	1	0
Career total										

=== International ===
Appearances and goals by national team and year
National team	Year	Apps	Goals
Algeria	2001	1	1
Algeria	2002	1	0
Algeria	2003	0	0
Algeria	2004	1	0
Algeria	2005	0	0
Algeria	2006	0	0
Algeria	2007	5	0
Algeria	2008	6	2
Algeria	2009	5	0
Algeria	2010	2	0
Algeria	2011	0	0
Algeria	2012	1	0
Algeria	2013	1	0
Total		23	3

#	Date	Venue	Opponent	Score	Result	Competition
1.	21 July 2001	Stade 19 Mai 1956, Annaba, Algeria	Egypt	1 – 1	1–1	2002 FIFA World Cup qualification
2.	20 August 2008	Stade Ferdi Petit, Le Touquet, France	United Arab Emirates	1 – 0	1–0	Friendly match
3.	5 September 2008	Stade Mustapha Tchaker, Blida, Algeria	Senegal	1 – 1	3–2	2010 FIFA World Cup qualification

== Honors ==
=== International ===
Algeria

- Africa Cup of Nations four place:2010
