= Derrahi Bousselah =

Coordinates: 36.3125°N 5.9277778°E

- Commune and town
- Interactive map of Derrahi Bousselah
- Country: Algeria
- Province: Mila Province
- District: Bouhatem District

Population (1998)
  - Total: 10,417
- Time zone: UTC+1 (CET)

Derrahi Bousselah is a town and commune in Mila Province, Algeria. At the 1998 census it had a population of 10,417.
