= Grarem Gouga =

Coordinates: 36.5167°N 6.3333°E

- Commune and town
- Interactive map of Grarem Gouga
- Country: Algeria
- Province: Mila Province
- District: Grarem Gouga District
- Municipality: Grarem

Population (1998)
  - Total: 36,482
- Time zone: UTC+1 (CET)

Grarem Gouga is a town in Grarem municipality, Grarem Gouga District, Mila Province, Algeria.

== Notable people ==
- Yacine Bezzaz - Algerian international footballer
