= Orchia gens =

The gens Orchia or Orcia was a minor plebeian family at Rome. Few members of this gens held Roman magistracies, of whom the most notable was probably Gaius Orchius, tribune of the plebs in 181 BC, and the author of a sumptuary law, the repeal of which was strongly opposed by Cato the Elder. Other Orchii are known from inscriptions.

== Origin ==
The nomen Orchius belongs to a class of gentilicia that are probably not Latin, but Sabine or Oscan. It seems to be the source of the nomen Orcivius or Orchivius, formed using an irregular suffix, -ivius, to create a new name out of an existing nomen.

== Praenomina ==
All of the Orchii known from ancient writers and inscriptions bore the praenomina Aulus, Gaius, or Lucius, all of which were common names throughout Roman history.

== Members ==
This list includes abbreviated praenomina. For an explanation of this practice, see filiation.

- Gaius Orchius, tribune of the plebs in 181 BC, passed a sumptuary law concerning the number of guests that were permitted at entertainments. Cato the Elder strongly opposed any repeal of the law, and gave an oration upon which the Roman grammarians remarked.
- Aulus Orcius, named in an inscription from Rome.
- Aulus Orchius A. l., a freedman named in an inscription from Rome.
- Gaius Orchius, buried at Puteoli.
- Aulus Orcius A. l. Antiochus, a freedman named in an inscription from Rome.
- Gaius Orchius Antiochus, the husband of Orchia Zosime, was a freedman mentioned in two inscriptions from Rome.
- Gaius Orcius C. l. Epaphra, named in an inscription the origin of which has been lost.
- Orchia Esyche, named in an inscription from Rome.
- Orcia A. l. Lais, a freedwoman named in an inscription from Rome.
- Lucius Orchius Menander, named in an inscription from Rome.
- Lucius Orchius Obsequens, named in an inscription from Rome.
- Aulus Orchius A. l. Pharnacis, a freedman named in an inscription from Rome.
- Aulus Orcius A. l. Sosipater, a freedman named in an inscription from Rome.
- Orchia Zosime, the wife of Gaius Orchius Antiochus, was a freedwoman mentioned in an inscription from Rome.

== See also ==
- List of Roman gentes

== Bibliography ==
- Sextus Pompeius Festus, Epitome de M. Verrio Flacco de Verborum Significatu (Epitome of Marcus Verrius Flaccus: On the Meaning of Words).
- Ambrosius Theodosius Macrobius, Saturnalia.
- Scholia Bobiensa (Bobbio Scholiast), In Ciceronis Pro Sestio (Commentary on Cicero's Oration Pro Sestio).
- Henricus Meyerus (Heinrich Meyer), Oratorum Romanorum Fragmenta ab Appio inde Caeco usque ad Q. Aurelium Symmachum (Fragments of Roman Orators from Appius Claudius Caecus to Quintus Aurelius Symmachus), L. Bourgeois-Mazé, Paris (1837).
- Dictionary of Greek and Roman Biography and Mythology, William Smith, ed., Little, Brown and Company, Boston (1849).
- Theodor Mommsen et alii, Corpus Inscriptionum Latinarum (The Body of Latin Inscriptions, abbreviated CIL), Berlin-Brandenburgische Akademie der Wissenschaften (1853–present).
- René Cagnat et alii, L'Année épigraphique (The Year in Epigraphy, abbreviated AE), Presses Universitaires de France (1888–present).
- T. Robert S. Broughton, The Magistrates of the Roman Republic, American Philological Association (1952).
