= Terrai Bainen =

Coordinates: 36°31′51″N 6°07′20″E

Terrai Bainem
- Commune and town
- Interactive map of Terrai Bainem
- Country: Algeria
- Province: Mila Province

Population (1998)
  - Total: 20,645
- Time zone: UTC+1 (CET)

Terrai Bainem is a town and commune in Mila Province, Algeria. At the 1998 census it had a population of 20,645.
