= Ouled Khalouf =

Coordinates: 36.055556°N 6.125°E

- Commune and town
- Interactive map of Ouled Khalouf
- Country: Algeria
- Province: Mila Province

Population (1998)
  - Total: 11,058
- Time zone: UTC+1 (CET)

Ouled Khalouf is a town and commune in Mila Province, Algeria. At the 1998 census it had a population of 11,058.
