= Aïn Beida Harriche =

Coordinates: 36.394444°N 5.893333°E

- Commune and town
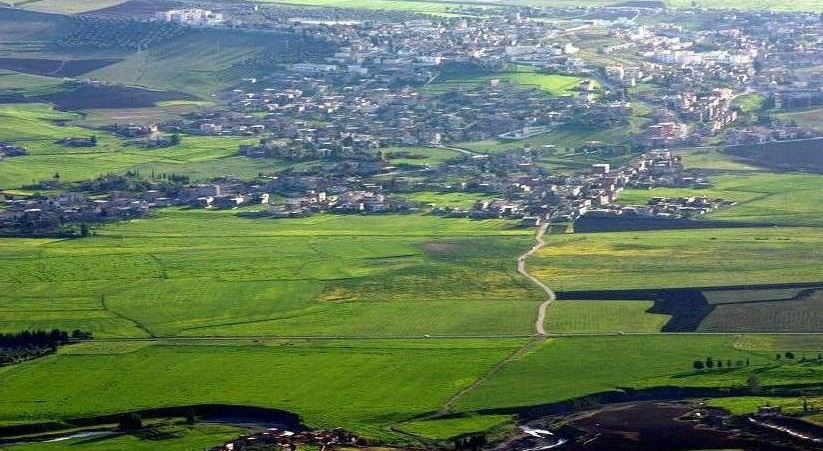
- Interactive map of Aïn Beida Harriche
- Country: Algeria
- Province: Mila Province

Population (1998)
  - Total: 18,513
- Time zone: UTC+1 (CET)

Aïn Beida Harriche is a town and commune in Mila Province, Algeria. At the 1998 census it had a population of 18,513.
