= Oued Athmania =

Coordinates: 36°14′59″N 6°17′10″E

- Commune and town
- Interactive map of Oued Athmania
- Country: Algeria
- Province: Mila Province

Population (1998)
  - Total: 35,934
- Time zone: UTC+1 (CET)

Oued Athmania is a town and commune in Mila Province, Algeria. At the 1998 census it had a population of 35,934.
