= El Mechira =

Coordinates: 36.010247°N 6.231267°E

El Mechira المشيرة
- Commune and town
- Country: Algeria
- Province: Mila Province

Area
  - Total: 74.22 sq mi (192.22 km^{2})

Population (2008)
  - Total: 12,908
- Time zone: UTC+1 (CET)
- Postal code: 43026

El Mechira is a town and commune in Mila Province, Algeria. At the 2008 census it had a population of 12908.
