= Tassadane Haddada =

- Commune and town
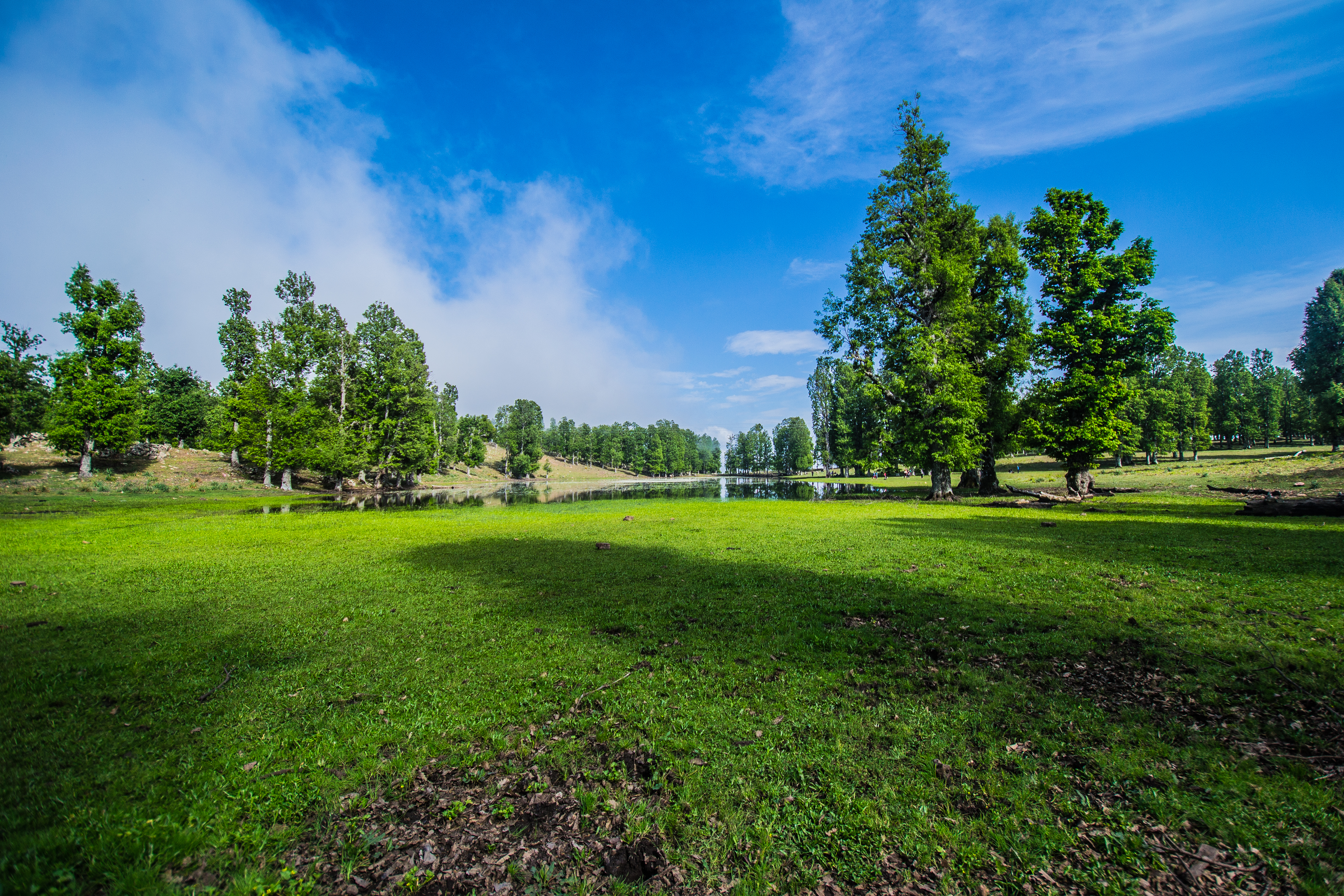

- Location within Algeria
- Country: Algeria
- Province: Mila Province

Population (1998)
  - Total: 17,623
- Time zone: UTC+1 (CET)

Tassadane Haddada is a town and commune in Mila Province, Algeria. At the 1998 census it had a population of 17,623.
