= Aïn Tine =

- Commune and town
- Interactive map of Aïn Tine
- Coordinates: 36°23′49″N 6°19′26″E
- Country: Algeria
- Province: Mila Province

Population (1998)
  - Total: 6,653
- Time zone: UTC+1 (CET)

Aïn Tine or Aïn Tinn (formerly Belfort) is a town and commune in Mila Province, Algeria. At the 1998 census it had a population of 6,653.

== History ==
Under the Roman Empire, it was called Coeliana, perhaps after the name of the Coelii Maximi family, and was part of the Roman province of Numidia.

Bishop Quodvultdeus of Coeliana was one of the Catholic bishops whom the Arian Vandal king Huneric summoned to Carthage in 484 and then exiled. Pius Bonifacius Gams,

No longer a residential bishopric, Coeliana is today listed by the Catholic Church as a titular see.
