= Sidi Merouane =

Coordinates: 36°32′N 1°20′E

- Commune and town
- Interactive map of Sidi Merouane
- Country: Algeria
- Province: Mila Province

Population (1998)
  - Total: 20,018
- Time zone: UTC+1 (CET)

Sidi Merouane (Greek: Σίντι Μερουάν, Sínti Merouán) is a town and commune in Mila Province, Algeria. At the 1998 census it had a population of 20,018.

A substantial proportion of the Greek speaking inhabitants of Cargèse on Corsica emigrated to Sidi Merouane in Algeria between 1874 and 1876. Of the total population of 1078 in 1872, it is estimated that 235 emigrated, all of them Greek speakers. According to anecdotal evidence from some Greeks in France and Corsican Greek descendants living in Greece, most of the Greek inhabitants of Sidi Merouane who survived the Algerian War of Independence resettled in Southern France following Algeria's independence from France in 1962, having largely assimilated with other French and European Pied-Noir settlers in Algeria, although a small number are known to have settled in Greece or emigrated to the United States.

== Sources ==
- Nicholas, Nick (2005), "A history of the Greek colony of Corsica", Journal of the Hellenic Diaspora, 31 (1), New York: 33–78.
- Stephanopoli de Comnène, Michel (2002), Histoire des Grecs–Maniotes en Corse: III. Cargèse 1776-1894 (in French), Athens: Études Laconiennes, ISBN 978-960-86254-3-3.
