= Zeghaia =

Zeghaia زغاية ⵣⴻⴴⴰⵢⴰ
- Commune and town
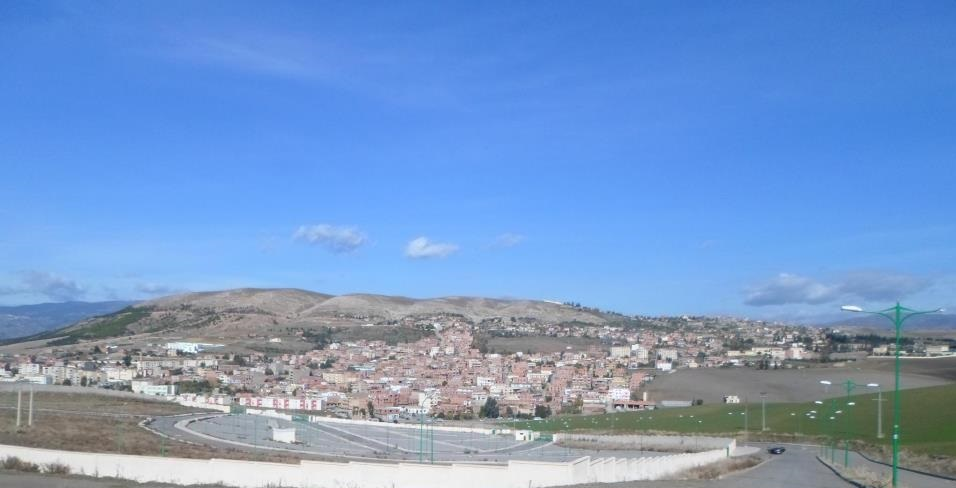

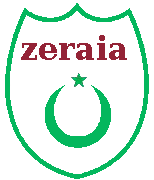
- Coat of arms

- Location within Algeria
- Coordinates: 36°28′5″N 6°10′21″E
- Country: Algeria
- Province: Mila Province

Area
  - Total: 23 sq mi (60 km^{2})

Population (2023)
  - Total: ≈ 39,000
- Time zone: UTC+1 (CET)

Zeghaia (Arabic: زغاية) is a town and commune in Mila Province, Algeria. As of the 1998 census, it had a population of 38,372.
