= Hamala, Algeria =

Coordinates: 36°34′N 6°20′E

- Commune and town
- Interactive map of Hamala, Algeria
- Country: Algeria
- Province: Mila Province

Population (1998)
  - Total: 10,810
- Time zone: UTC+1 (CET)

Hamala, Algeria is a town and commune in Mila Province, Algeria. At the 1998 census it had a population of 10,810.
