= Chigara =

Coordinates: 36°33′36″N 6°13′21″E

Chigara Zouagha
- Commune and town
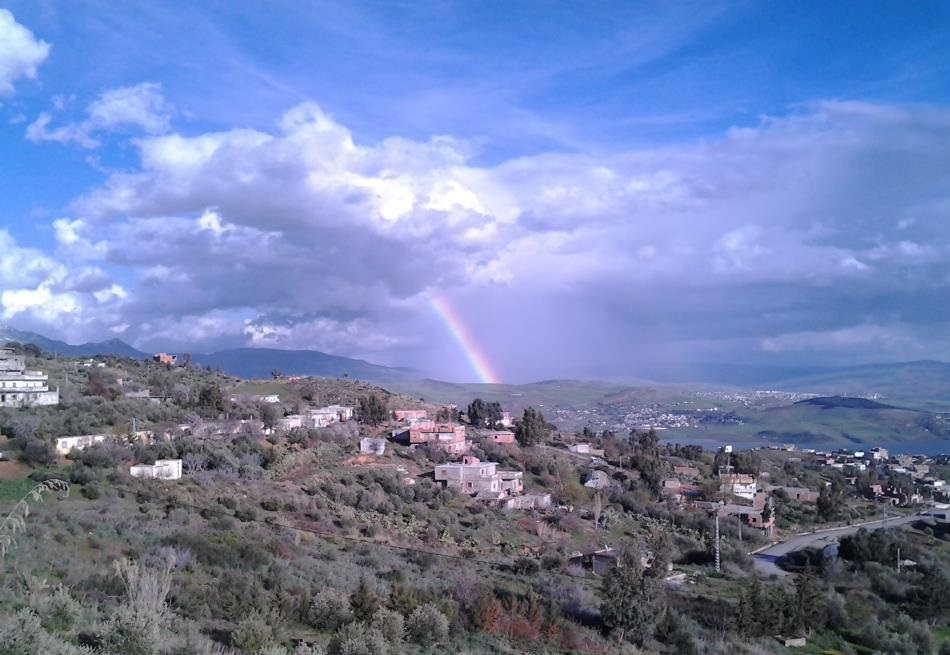

- Country: Algeria
- Province: Mila Province

Population (1998)
  - Total: 13,609
- Time zone: UTC+1 (CET)

Chigara is a town and commune in Mila Province, Algeria. At the 1998 census it had a population of 13,609.
