= Ferdjioua =

Ferdjioua (ⴼⴻⵔⵊⵉⵡⴰ) Fedj M'zala (imzalen)
- District and town
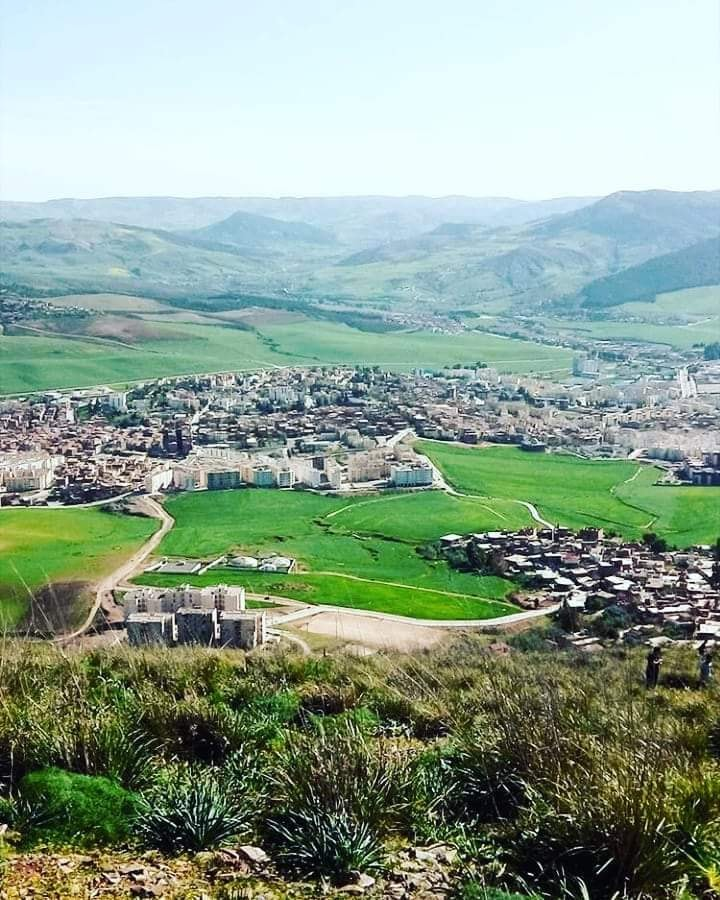

- Location within Algeria
- Country: Algeria
- Province: Mila Province
- District: dayra n ferğiwa

Population (2008)
  - Total: 61 894
- Time zone: UTC+1 (CET)

Ferdjioua is a city in Algeria, formerly called Fedj M'zala in kabyle ferğiwa / ⴼⴻⵔⵊⵉⵡⴰ , town and commune in Mila Province part of chawia. At the 2024 census it had a population of 71,994.
