= Grarem =

Coordinates: 36°31′N 6°20′E

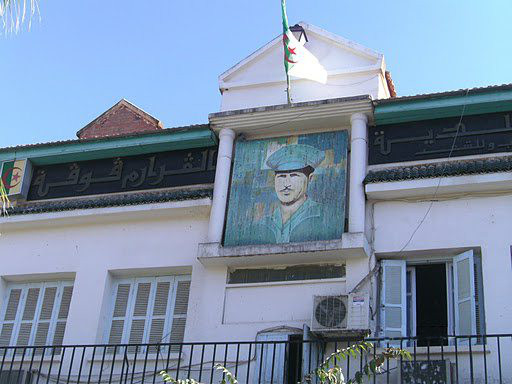

Grarem is a municipality in Mila Province, Algeria. Its administrative center is Grarem Gouga. At the 2008 census, the municipality had a population of 28,552.

It took its name from two different entities. Grarem comes from the word guroum, which means rock or pebble. Gouga is the name of a native hero of the War of Independence, after whom the town was renamed following independence.
