= Yahia Beniguecha =

Yahia Beni-Guecha
- Commune and town
- Interactive map of Yahia Beni-Guecha
- Coordinates: 36°23′32″N 5°59′32″E
- Country: Algeria
- Province: Mila Province

Population (1998)
  - Total: 10,681
- Time zone: UTC+1 (CET)

Yahia Beni-Guecha (formerly Lucet) is a town and commune in Mila Province, Algeria. At the 1998 census it had a population of 10,681.
