= Amira Arras =

Coordinates: 36°32′15″N 6°3′55″E

Amira Arras عميرة آراس ⵄⴻⵎⵉⵔⴰ ⴰⵔⴻⵙ
- Commune and town
- Interactive map of Amira Arras
- Country: Algeria
- Province: Mila Province

Population (1998)
  - Total: 18,722
- Time zone: UTC+1 (CET)

Amira Arras (Arabic: عميرة آراس) is a town and commune in Mila Province, Algeria. At the 1998 census it had a population of 18,722.
