= Benyahia Abderrahmane =

Coordinates: 36°14′N 6°01′E

- Commune and town
- Interactive map of Benyahia Abderrahmane
- Country: Algeria
- Province: Mila Province
- District: Tadjenanet District

Population (1998)
  - Total: 10,222
- Time zone: UTC+1 (CET)

Benyahia Abderrahmane is a town and commune in Mila Province, Algeria. At the 1998 census it had a population of 10,222.
