= Minar Zarza =

Coordinates: 36°19′03″N 5°32′24″E

- Commune and town
- Interactive map of Minar Zarza
- Country: Algeria
- Province: Mila Province

Population (1998)
  - Total: 20,620
- Time zone: UTC+1 (CET)

Minar Zarza is a town and commune in Mila Province, Algeria. According to the 1998 census it had a population of 20,620. It is relatively isolated to other towns of the wilaya. It is also well known for its hard geographical location, limited investments and weak infrastructure. Most people travel out of the town looking for jobs to improve their living conditions. Recently, local authorities are working hard to pave new roads, rebuild the town hall, facilitate services, create new job opportunities and housing projects.

== History ==
During the French colonization, the people of Minar Zareza fought against the colons with simple arms. One of the most prominent militants was Minar Amar who was one of the 1954 revolution commanders in this region. The French army retaliated to Mujahid's attacks using heavy and chemical weapons. According to witnesses, the French army has used toxic gases to kill a group of Mujahids and citizens, when they hided in a cave, most of them were killed with cold blood.

Until recently, Minar Zareza was a commune of Jijel. Now, it is that of the Wilaya of Mila.

== Economy ==
The commune suffers from isolation, unemployment and lack of health services. Zareza is famous with olive tree with no significant revenues i.e. for local consumption. The commune has no productive institutions for lack of investments and funds. Most of nowadays projects do not sufficiently create new job opportunities for young people.
