= Bouhatem =

Coordinates: 36°18′14″N 6°00′51″E

Boukhatem
- Commune and town
- Interactive map of Boukhatem
- Country: Algeria
- Province: Mila Province

Population (1998)
  - Total: 19,193
- Time zone: UTC+1 (CET)

Boukhatem, also known as Bouhatem, is a town and commune in Mila Province, Algeria. At the 1998 census it had a population of 19,193.
