= Ahmed Rachedi, Mila =

Ahmed Rachedi
- Commune and town
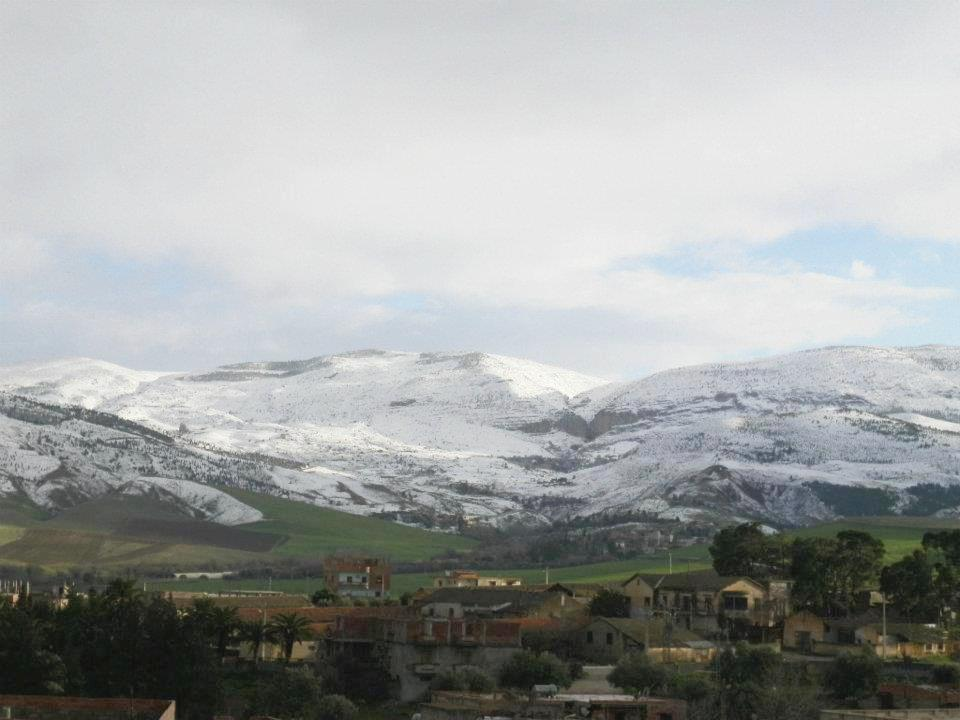

- Location within Algeria
- Country: Algeria
- Province: Mila Province

Population (1998)
  - Total: 14,489
- Time zone: UTC+1 (CET)

Ahmed Rachedi is a town and commune in Mila Province, Algeria. At the 1998 census it had a population of 14,489.
