= Tiberguent =

Coordinates: 36°24′34″N 6°02′23″E

- Commune and town
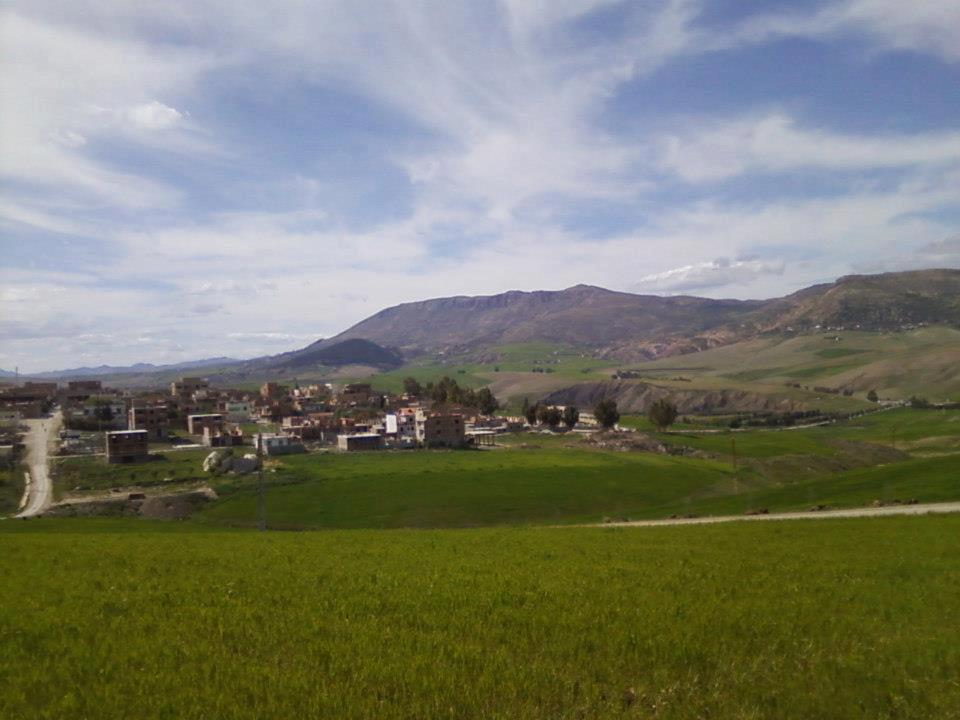
- Tiberguent
- Interactive map of Tiberguent
- Country: Algeria
- Province: Mila Province

Population (1998)
  - Total: 8,286
- Time zone: UTC+1 (CET)

Tiberguent is a town and commune in Mila Province, Algeria. At the 1998 census, it had a population of 8,286.
