= Oued Endja =

Coordinates: 36°30′00″N 6°04′17″E

Oued Endja وادي النجاء in arabic
- Commune
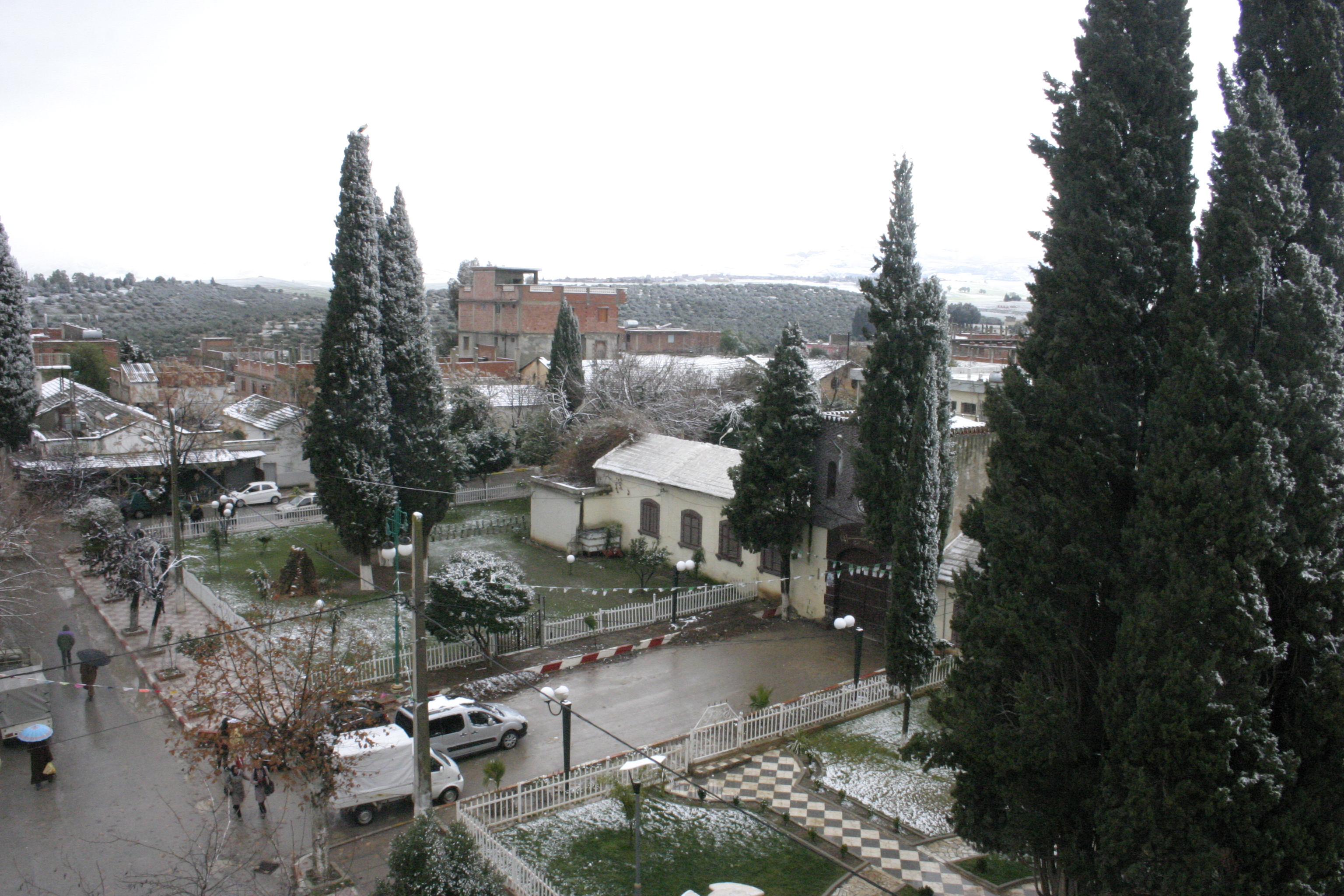

- Country: Algeria
- Province: Mila Province

Area
  - Total: 20.61 sq mi (53.39 km^{2})

Population (2008)
  - Total: 19,739
  - Density: 960/sq mi (370/km^{2})
- Time zone: UTC+1 (CET)
- Postal code: 43346

Oued Endja وادي النجاء is a commune in Mila Province, Algeria. Redjas town is the capital. At the 2008 census it had a population of 19739.

There are 7 named mountains in Oued Endja District, with Koudiat Zouacha the highest point. The most prominent mountain is Djebel Essatour.
