= Sidi Khelifa =

Coordinates: 36.349690°N 6.300383°E

Sidi Khelifa (سيدي خليفة)
- Commune and town
- Interactive map of Sidi Khelifa
- Country: Algeria
- Province: Mila Province

Population (1998)
  - Total: 4,505
- Time zone: UTC+1 (CET)

Sidi Khelifa is a town and commune in Mila Province, Algeria. At the 1998 census it had a population of 4,505.
