= Mila (city) =

Mila ميلة ⵎⵉⵍⴰ
- city
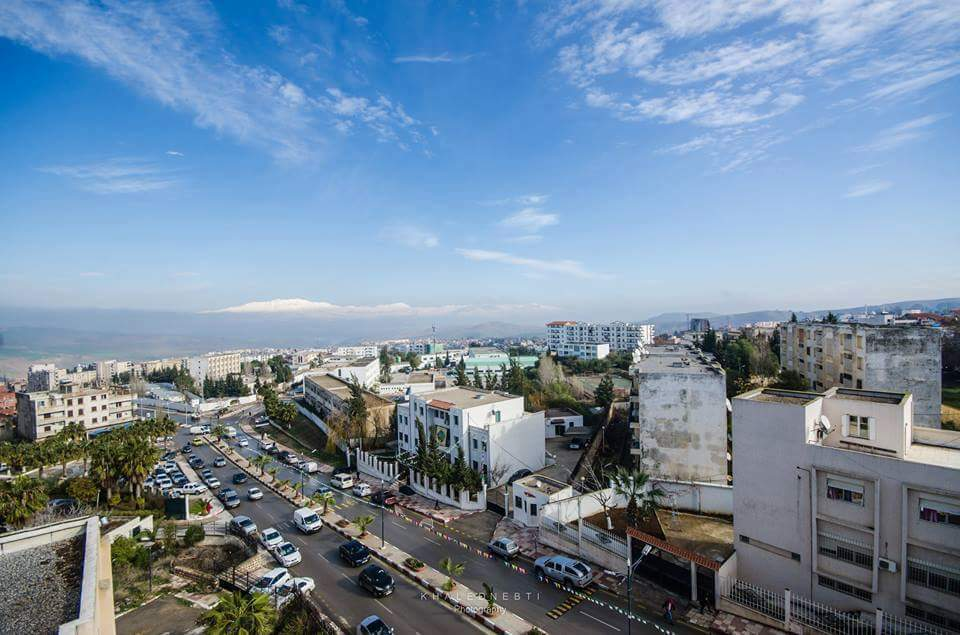
- Mila city

- city Mila in Mila Province

- Location within Algeria
- Coordinates: 36.45°N 6.266667°E
- Country: Algeria
- Province: Mila Province
- District: Mila District
- Established: 255 AD

Area
  - Total: 129.89 km^{2} (50.15 sq mi)

Population (2008)
  - Total: 69,052
- Time zone: UTC+1 (CET)
- Postal code: 43000

Mila (Arabic: ميلة, mīla, [miːla]) is a city in the northeast of Algeria and the capital of Mila Province. In antiquity, it was known as Milevum (in Latin; as such still a Latin Catholic titular see) or Miraeon, Μιραίον (in Ancient Greek) and was situated in the Roman province of Numidia.

== History ==
=== Ancient history ===
In Ptolemy's Geography, IV, iii, 7, the city is mentioned under the name of Mileum or Mireon. During the Roman era it was called Colonia Sarnensis Milevitana, after the River Sarnus in Campania, whence the colonists had emigrated. This name is often found in the inscriptions of the city. Together with Cirta, Collo and Rusicade, Milevum formed the confederation known as the Four Colonies, the territory of which was very extensive. In the 6th century the Byzantine Emperor Justinian had Milevum enclosed by a fortified wall, which still stands and forms a rampart for the Muslim city of Mila. It has yielded quite a number of Latin inscriptions from this city and a colossal statue of Saturn.

=== Under Arab Islamic rule ===
Between 665 and 682 the city was conquered by the Umayyad Arabs commanded by the Egyptian general Abu al-Muhajir Dinar.

In multiple book mentioned precisely City Mila conquered by Abu Muhajer General Umayyad Dinar in 675 AD in it, says in "The Berbers: study on the conquest of Africa by the Arabs, according to the printed Arabic texts. "Volume 1 by Henri Fournel on page The Mosque Sidi Ghanem of Mila was built around 675 by Abu Muhajer Dnar Dinar In the tenth century AD, historian and geographer Abu Ubayd-Allah Abd Al-Bakri quoted the mosque of Sidi Ghanem as "the first Mila mosque adjoining Dar El Imara" (House of Command).

As multiple significant evidence was found of Mila in the Arab period, as standard weight of 745 Umayyad registered with: "'Translation: "In the name of Allah. Among the steps ordered / Emir Abd al-Rahman ibn Habib / Masal ibn Hammad, Wali Mila / twenty ûkîya (once) in the year 127-745)/" The name of the governor mentioned on the standard is well known: 'Abd al-Rahmān ibn Habīb, the grandson of 'Uqba ibn al-Nāfī', who governed the Maghreb between 744 and 754 after returning from Spain, where he had taken refuge following the disastrous battle of Tangiers.

In the 11th-century al-Bakri describes the Mila population as consisting of Arabs, people from the militia, and people of mixed race (Arabic, Roman and Berber).

But according to al-Idrissi it remained in the 11th century that there were 4000 Kutama Berbers throughout Ifriqiya

=== Ottoman rule ===
Finally in the 19th century it was the largest colony Koulouglis of the East-Algeria (Constatinnois) (mix of Turk with Arab or Berber)

=== French colonial era ===
According to the scientist and military E.Carette (1808–1890), author of the tribal map of Algeria, and studies "inquiry into the origin and migration of the main tribes of North Africa, particularly of Algeria '"on page 453 there was a Mila 19th century about 800 ethnic Arabs and 800 ethnic Berbers in the city Milevum, modern Arabic name Mila, was under French colonial rule a city in the department of Constantine in Algeria, with in the early 20th century 8000 inhabitants, 400 of whom are Europeans.

=== Modern history ===
Constantine department later became Constantine Province after the independence of Algeria, of which Mila was dependent till the creation of Mila Province in 1984. At the 1998 census the city had a population of 59,959.

== Ecclesiastical history ==
Milevum was among the many towns of sufficient importance in the Roman province of Numidia, in the papal sway, to become a suffragan diocese.

The historically recorded bishops of this episcopal see were

- Pollianus, present at the Council of Carthage called by Cyprianus of Carthage on the lapsi, Christians who accepted forced pagan sacrificing to avoid martyrdom, himself martyred two years later
- Optatus, noted for his work De schismate Donatistarum (circa 375) against the Donatist heresy; he died in about 385 and is commemorated on 4 June
- Honorius, deposed for incompetence according to Church Father Augustine of Hippo
- Severus, fellow-countryman and correspondent of the above Augustine; attended, with his schismatical Donatist counterpart Adeodato, the Council of Carthage of 411, with other African bishops of both sides
- Morcelli next list Optatus II, who was probably in fact bishop of Vescera
- Bennatus participated in the Council of Carthage of 484, called by king Huneric of the Vandal Kingdom, after which he was exiled, like most Catholic bishops
- Restitutus, who attended the Fifth Œcumenical Council in Constantinople in 553.

Two church councils were held at Milevum, one in 402 and the other in 416. The second appealed to Pope Innocent I for repression of the Pelagian heresy.

The bishopric is last mentioned, as one of the thirteen subsisting suffragan sees in Numidia, in the Notitiae Episcopatuum in the reign of Byzantine emperor Leo VI (886-912).

=== Titular see ===
The diocese was nominally restored, no later than the 17th century, as Latin titular bishopric of Milevum (Latin) / Milevi (Curiate Italian) / Milevitan(us) (Latin adjective).

It has had the following incumbents, mostly of the fitting Episcopal (lowest) rank, with two archiepiscopal exceptions:

- Joseph Ignace Randrianasolo (1997.10.24 – 1999.06.03)
- José Manuel Piña Torres (1958.05.12 – 1997.07.07)
- Jean-Félix de Hemptinne (1932.03.22 – 1958.02.06)
- Anton Gisler (1928.04.20 – 1932.01.04)
- Titular Archbishop: Acacio Chacón Guerra (1926.05.10 – 1927.08.01)
- Giovanni Borzatti de Löwenstern (1907.03.11 – 1926.02.17)
- James Bellord (1899.02.05 – 1905.06.11)
- Charles Lavigne (1887.09.13 – 1898.08.27)
- Jean-Marie Tissot (1863.08.11 – 1886.09.01)
- William Bernard Allen Collier (1840.02.14 – 1847.12.07)
- Thomas Coen (1816.01.26 – 1831.10.09)
- Wilhelm Joseph Leopold Willibald von Baden (1779.07.12 – 1798.07.09)
- Anton Révay (1754.05.20 – 1776.09.16)
- Caius Asterius Toppi (1728.11.15 – 1754)
- Johann Ignaz Dlouhovesky (1679.04.10 – 1701.01.10)
- Hyacinthus de Saldanha (1675.01.28 – ?)
- Emmanuel a S. Ludovico (1672.02.08 – ?)
- Titular Archbishop Joseph Chennoth (車納德) (born India) (1999.08.24 – ...) as papal diplomat : Chargé d'affaires in PR China (1995.04.26 – 1999.08.24), Apostolic Nuncio (ambassador) to Chad (1999.08.24 – 2005.06.15), Apostolic Nuncio to Central African Republic (1999.08.24 – 2005.06.15), Apostolic Nuncio to Tanzania (2005.06.15 – 2011.08.15), Apostolic Nuncio to Japan (2011.08.15 – ...)

== See also ==
- List of Catholic dioceses in Algeria

== Sources and external links ==
- [ GCatholic - (former and) titular bishopric]
- Herbermann, Charles, ed. (1913). "Milevum" . Catholic Encyclopedia. New York: Robert Appleton Company.

Bibliography

- A. Benabbès: "Les premiers raids arabes en Numidie Byzantine: questions toponymiques." In Identités et Cultures dans l'Algérie Antique, University of Rouen, 2005 (ISBN 2-87775-391-3)
- P. Trousset (2002). Les limites sud de la réoccupation Byzantine. Antiquité Tardive v. 10, p. 143-150.
- Pius Bonifacius Gams, Series episcoporum Ecclesiae Catholicae, Leipzig 1931, p. 467
- Stefano Antonio Morcelli, Africa christiana, Volume I, Brescia 1816, pp. 228–229
- Konrad Eubel, Hierarchia Catholica Medii Aevi, vol. 5, p. 268; vol. 6, p. 289
- J. Mesnage, L'Afrique chrétienne, Paris 1912, pp. 335–336
- H. Jaubert, Anciens évêchés et ruines chrétiennes de la Numidie et de la Sitifienne, in Recueil des Notices et Mémoires de la Société archéologique de Constantine, vol. 46, 1913, pp. 63–64
