= Oued Seguen =

Coordinates: 36.170991°N 6.419985°E

- Commune and town
- Interactive map of Oued Seguen
- Country: Algeria
- Province: Mila Province

Population (1998)
  - Total: 11,792
- Time zone: UTC+1 (CET)

Oued Seguen is a town and commune in Mila Province, Algeria. At the 1998 census it had a population of 11,792.
