= Tessala Lemtai =

Coordinates: 36°34′09″N 5°59′09″E

- Commune and town
- Interactive map of Tessala Lemtai
- Country: Algeria
- Province: Mila Province

Population (1998)
  - Total: 13,849
- Time zone: UTC+1 (CET)

Tessala Lemtai is a town and commune in Mila Province, Algeria. At the 1998 census it had a population of 13,849.
