= Rouached =

Coordinates: 36°27′30″N 6°02′23″E

Rouached ghomriane
- Commune and town
- Interactive map of Rouached
- Country: Algeria
- Province: Mila Province

Population (1998)
  - Total: 25,399
- Time zone: UTC+1 (CET)

Rouached is a town and commune in Mila Province, Algeria. At the 1998 census it had a population of 25,399.
