= Teleghma =

Coordinates: 36°07′N 6°22′E

- Commune and town
- Interactive map of Teleghma
- Country: Algeria
- Province: Mila Province

Population (2008)
  - Total: 48,846
- Time zone: UTC+1 (CET)

Teleghma (also Telerghma and Telergma) is a town and commune in Mila Province, Algeria. At the 2008 census it had a population of 48,846.

In late Antiquity and early Middle Ages the town was a centre of Byzantine Christianity.

== Climate ==
Climate data for Teleghma
Month	Jan	Feb	Mar	Apr	May	Jun	Jul	Aug	Sep	Oct	Nov	Dec	Year
Mean daily maximum °C (°F)	12 (53)	11 (51)	14 (58)	20 (68)	24 (76)	29 (85)	36 (96)	33 (92)	31 (88)	22 (71)	14 (57)	12 (53)	22 (71)
Mean daily minimum °C (°F)	−1 (31)	0 (32)	2 (36)	7 (45)	9 (48)	13 (56)	18 (64)	16 (61)	15 (59)	9 (49)	4 (40)	3 (37)	8 (47)
Average precipitation mm (inches)	13 (0.5)	38 (1.5)	30 (1.2)	86 (3.4)	5.1 (0.2)	25 (1)	0 (0)	5.1 (0.2)	18 (0.7)	36 (1.4)	36 (1.4)	38 (1.5)	330 (12.8)
Source: Weatherbase
