= Mila Province =

Province of Algeria

Mila Province ولاية ميلة
- Province
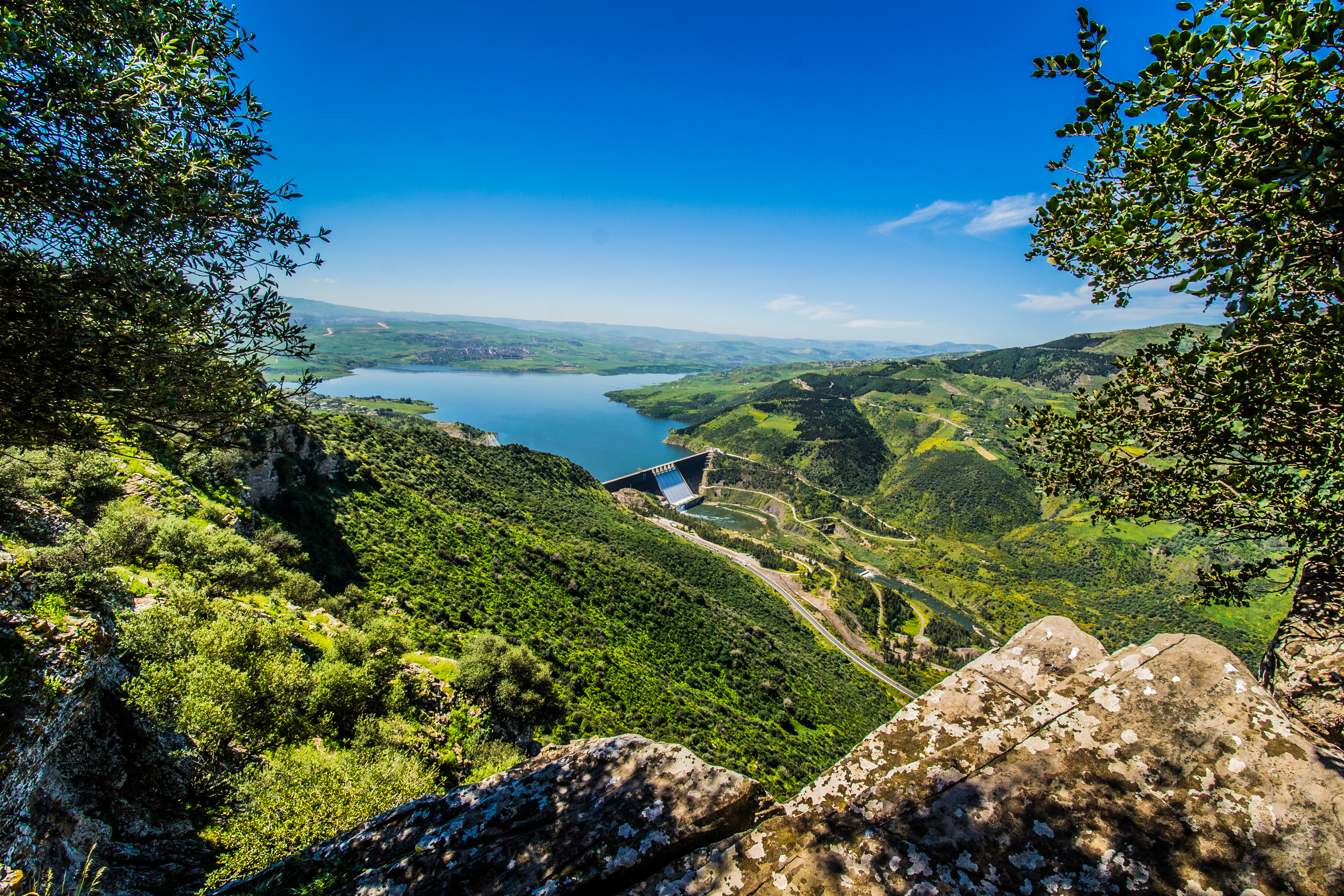

- Map of Algeria highlighting Mila
- Coordinates: 36°27′N 06°16′E
- Country: Algeria
- Capital: Mila

Area
  - Total: 9,375 km^{2} (3,620 sq mi)

Population (2008)
  - Total: 768,419
  - Density: 81.96/km^{2} (212.3/sq mi)
- Time zone: UTC+01 (CET)
- Area Code: +213 43, +213 31
- ISO 3166 code: DZ-43
- Districts: 13
- Municipalities: 32

Mila (Arabic: ولاية ميلة, wilāya mīla) is a province (wilayah) of Algeria, whose capital is Mila. Other localities include Teleghma, Grarem Gouga, Hamala and Rouached.

== History ==
The province was created from parts of Constantine Province, Jijel Province, Oum el Bouaghi Province and Sétif Province in 1984.

== Administrative divisions ==
The province is divided into 13 districts (daïras), which are further divided into 32 communes or municipalities.

=== Districts ===
1. Aïn Beida Harriche
2. Bouhatem
3. Chelghoum Laïd
4. Ferdjioua
5. Grarem Gouga
6. Mila
7. Oued Endja
8. Rouached
9. Sidi Merouane
10. Tadjenanet
11. Tassadane Haddada
12. Teleghma
13. Terrai Bainen

=== Communes ===
1. Ahmed Rachedi
2. Aïn Beida Harriche
3. Aïn Mellouk
4. Aïn Tine
5. Amira Arras
6. Benyahia Abderrahmane
7. Bouhatem
8. Chelghoum Laïd
9. Chigara
10. Derradji Bousselah
11. El Mechira
12. Elayadi Barbes
13. Ferdjioua
14. Grarem Gouga
15. Hamala
16. Mila
17. Minar Zarza
18. Oued Athmania
19. Oued Endja
20. Oued Seguen
21. Ouled Khalouf
22. Rouached
23. Sidi Khelifa
24. Sidi Merouane
25. Tadjenanet
26. Tassadane Haddada
27. Teleghma
28. Terrai Bainen
29. Tessala Ldematai
30. Tiberguent
31. Yahia Beniguecha
32. Zeghaia
