= Ziyadat Allah =

Ziyadat Allah (Arabic: زيادة الله, romanized: Ziyādat Allāh) can refer to:

- Ziyadat Allah I of Ifriqiya, third Aghlabid emir of Ifriqiya (817–838)
- Ziyadat Allah II of Ifriqiya, seventh Aghlabid emir of Ifriqiya (863–864)
- Ziyadat Allah III of Ifriqiya, eleventh and last Aghlabid emir of Ifriqiya (903–909)
