= Qantrara =

Historical city

Qantrara was an important Ibadite city and the chief town of Rustamid controlled Qastiliya located in the vicinity of Nefta on the Souf road. It was mainly populated by the Nafusa.

== Aghlabid attack ==
After the battle of manu, the Aghlabids attacked Qantrara and later attacked Nafzawa. In August–September 897, Ibrahim's son Abu l-'Abbas returned and attacked the Nafusa. Its in these campaign where around 300 or 500 inhabitants including 80 ibadi scholars were imprisoned and brought back to Ifriqiya where they were executed.

== See also ==
- Rustamid Dynasty
- Aghlabids
