= Sousse–Kairouan Decauville railway =

Rail line in Tunisia

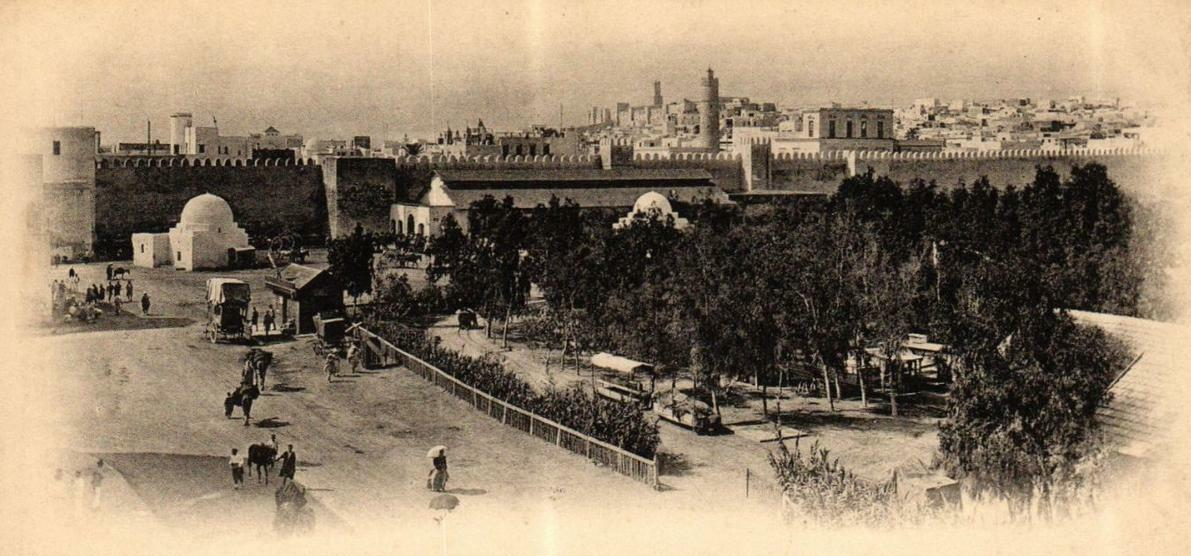

Technical
- Line length: 64 kilometres (40 mi)
- Track gauge: 600 mm (1 ft 11 5/8 in)

The Sousse–Kairouan Decauville railway was a 64 km (40 mi) long 600 mm (1 ft 11 5/8 in) gauge Decauville military railway from Sousse to Kairouan in Tunisia. It operated from 1882 to 1896, before it was re-gauged to 1,000 mm (3 ft 3 3/8 in).

== History ==
The French army occupied Kairouan in 1881. Pioneers then built the narrow gauge railway from Sousse on the coast to the former capital Kairouan within 3½ months. It ran mainly on an old Roman road.

The open-sided carriages arrived before 1 January 1882 in Sousse. The first train transported wounded soldieres on 3 February 1882 from Kairouan to Sousse. The waggons were initially drawn by horses and later by steam locomotives. The railway was regauged from 600 mm (1 ft 11 5/8 in) to 1,000 mm (3 ft 3 3/8 in) gauge in 1896.
