= Muhammad II of Ifriqiya =

Emir of Ifriqiya (864–875)

Muhammad II ibn Ahmad محمد بن أحمد
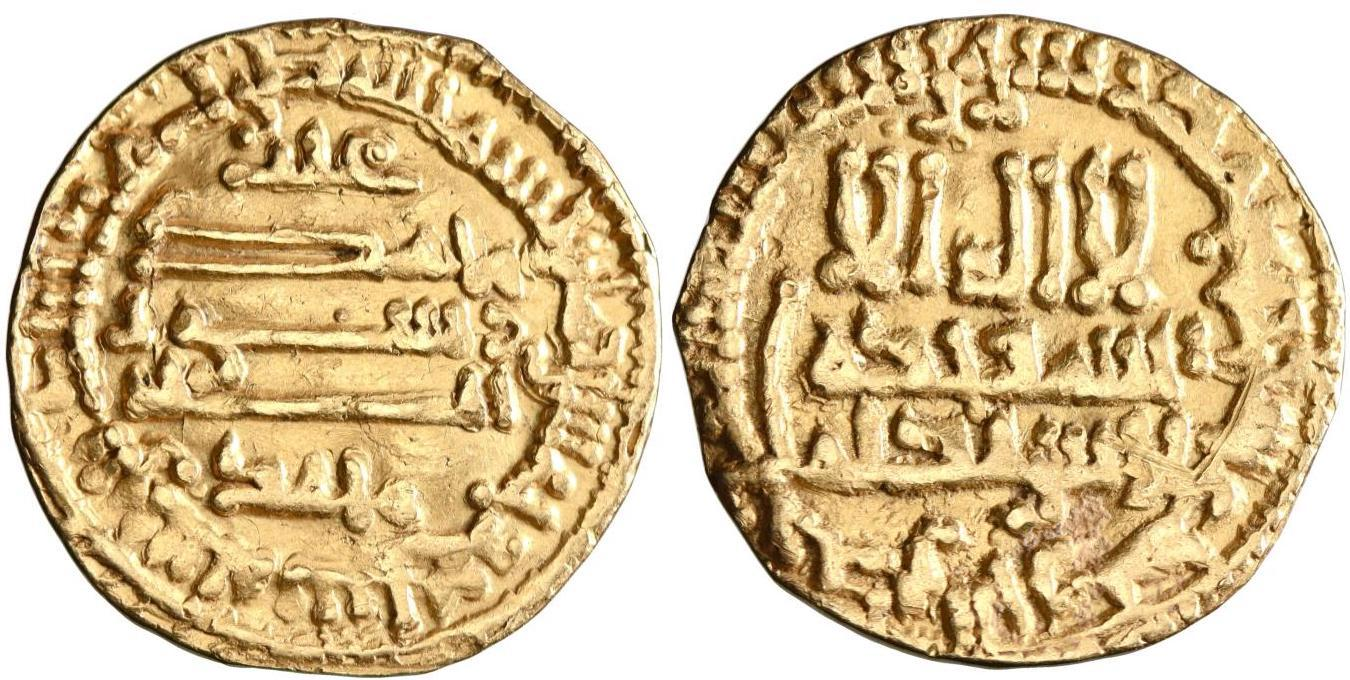
- Gold dinar under Muhammad ibn Ahmad 257 AH

Emir of Ifriqiya, Sicily and Malta
- Reign: December 864 – 875
- Predecessor: Ziyadat Allah ibn Muhammad
- Successor: Ibrahim II
- Born: unknown date
- Died: c. 875
Names
- Abu 'l-Gharaniq Muhammad ibn Ahmad ibn Muhammad
- House: Aghlabid
- Father: Ahmad ibn Muhammad
- Religion: Islam
- Military career
- Service years: c. 865 – 875
- Conflicts: Arab conquest of Sicily, Siege of Melite, Siege of Salerno

Abu 'l-Gharaniq Muhammad II ibn Ahmad (Arabic: أبو الغرانيق محمد الثاني بن أحمد) (died 875) was the eighth Emir of Ifriqiya from 864 to 875.

He succeeded his uncle Ziyadat Allah II (863–864), inheriting from his predecessors a stable and prosperous state. An aesthete fond of wine and hunting, he felt able to devote himself to extravagance and displays of pomp. His reign saw the conquest of Malta, the siege of Salerno and continuous raids into mainland Italy, forcing Pope John VIII to pay tribute.

Towards the end of his reign a caravan of pilgrims from Mecca introduced the plague into Ifriqiya – this, and an ensuing famine led to severe depopulation and the weakening of the emirate.

On 20 July 875, Abbasid caliph al-Mu'tamid formally arranged for the governance of the state and his succession: Ja'far, given the honorific name al-Mufawwid ila-llah, was named heir-apparent and assigned the western half of the Caliphate, while al-Mu'tamid's brother, Abu Ahmad, known as al-Muwaffaq, received the eastern provinces and was named second heir, except for the event that the Caliph died while al-Mufawwid was still a minor. Al-Mufawwid was thus nominally responsible for Ifriqiya, Egypt, Syria, the Jazira and Mosul, Armenia, Mihrajanqadhaq and Hulwan, with Musa ibn Bugha as his deputy. Nevertheless, it was al-Muwaffaq (his uncle) who held the actual power in the state.

Muhammad was succeeded by his brother Abu Ishaq Ibrahim II (875–902).
