= Ziyadat Allah II ibn Muhammad =

Emir of Ifriqiya (856–863)

Ziyadat Allah II ibn Muhammad زيادات الله بن محمد

Emir of Ifriqiya, Sicily and Malta
- Reign: 28 December 863 – 23 December 864
- Predecessor: Abu Ibrahim Ahmad ibn Muhammad
- Successor: Muhammad II
- Died: 23 December 864
Names
- Ziyadat Allah ibn Muhammad
- House: Aghlabid
- Father: Muhammad I ibn al-Aghlab
- Religion: Islam

Ziyadat Allah II ibn Muhammad (Arabic: أبو محمد زيادة الله بن محمد) was the seventh Aghlabid emir of Ifriqiya, ruling from 28 December 863 to his death on 23 December 864.

Ziyadat Allah rule Ifriqiya during the Extreme instability in Abbasid Caliphate. He succeeded his brother, Ahmad, and was succeeded by Ahmad's son Muhammad II.

== Sources ==
- Marçais, G. & Schacht, J. (1960). "Ag̲h̲labids or Banu 'l-Ag̲h̲lab". In Gibb, H. A. R.; Kramers, J. H.; Lévi-Provençal, E.; Schacht, J.; Lewis, B. & Pellat, Ch. (eds.). The Encyclopaedia of Islam, Second Edition. Volume I: A–B. Leiden: E. J. Brill. pp. 247–250. doi:10.1163/1573-3912_islam_COM_0024. OCLC 495469456.

Ziyadat Allah II ibn Muhammad Aghlabid dynasty
Preceded by Ahmad	Emir of Ifriqiya; 863–864	Succeeded by Muhammad II
