= Abdallah ibn Ibrahim =

Emir of Ifriqiya (812–817)

Abdallah ibn Ibrahim عبدالله بن ابراهيم
- Emir of Ifriqiya (812 – 25 June 817)
- Predecessor: Ibrahim ibn al-Aghlab
- Successor: Ziyadat Allah
- Died: 25 June 817
- Children: Abbas
Names
- Abu'l-Abbas Abdallah ibn Ibrahim ibn al-Aghlab
- Dynasty: Aghlabids
- Father: Ibrahim ibn al-Aghlab
- Religion: Sunni Islam

Abu al-Abbas Abdallah I ibn Ibrahim I ibn al-Aghlabi (Arabic: أبو العباس عبد الله الأول بن إبراهيم الأول الأغلبي) was the second Aghlabid emir of Ifriqiya, ruling from October/November 812 to his death on 25 June 817.

He was known for his beauty, but also for his arbitrary rule, as he introduced a tax on crops in cash, instead of the usual tithe in kind. This tax was contrary to Quranic precedent and aroused much opposition. When Abdallah died shortly after, it was widely considered as a divine punishment.

He was succeeded by his brother Ziyadat Allah I.

== Sources ==
- Marçais, G. & Schacht, J. (1960). "Ag̲h̲labids or Banu 'l-Ag̲h̲lab". In Gibb, H. A. R.; Kramers, J. H.; Lévi-Provençal, E.; Schacht, J.; Lewis, B. & Pellat, Ch. (eds.). The Encyclopaedia of Islam, Second Edition. Volume I: A–B. Leiden: E. J. Brill. pp. 247–250. doi:10.1163/1573-3912_islam_COM_0024. OCLC 495469456.

Abdallah ibn Ibrahim Aghlabid dynasty
Preceded by Ibrahim I	Emir of Ifriqiya; 812–817	Succeeded by Ziyadat Allah I
