= Kairouan =

Kairouan ٱلْقَيْرَوَان
- City
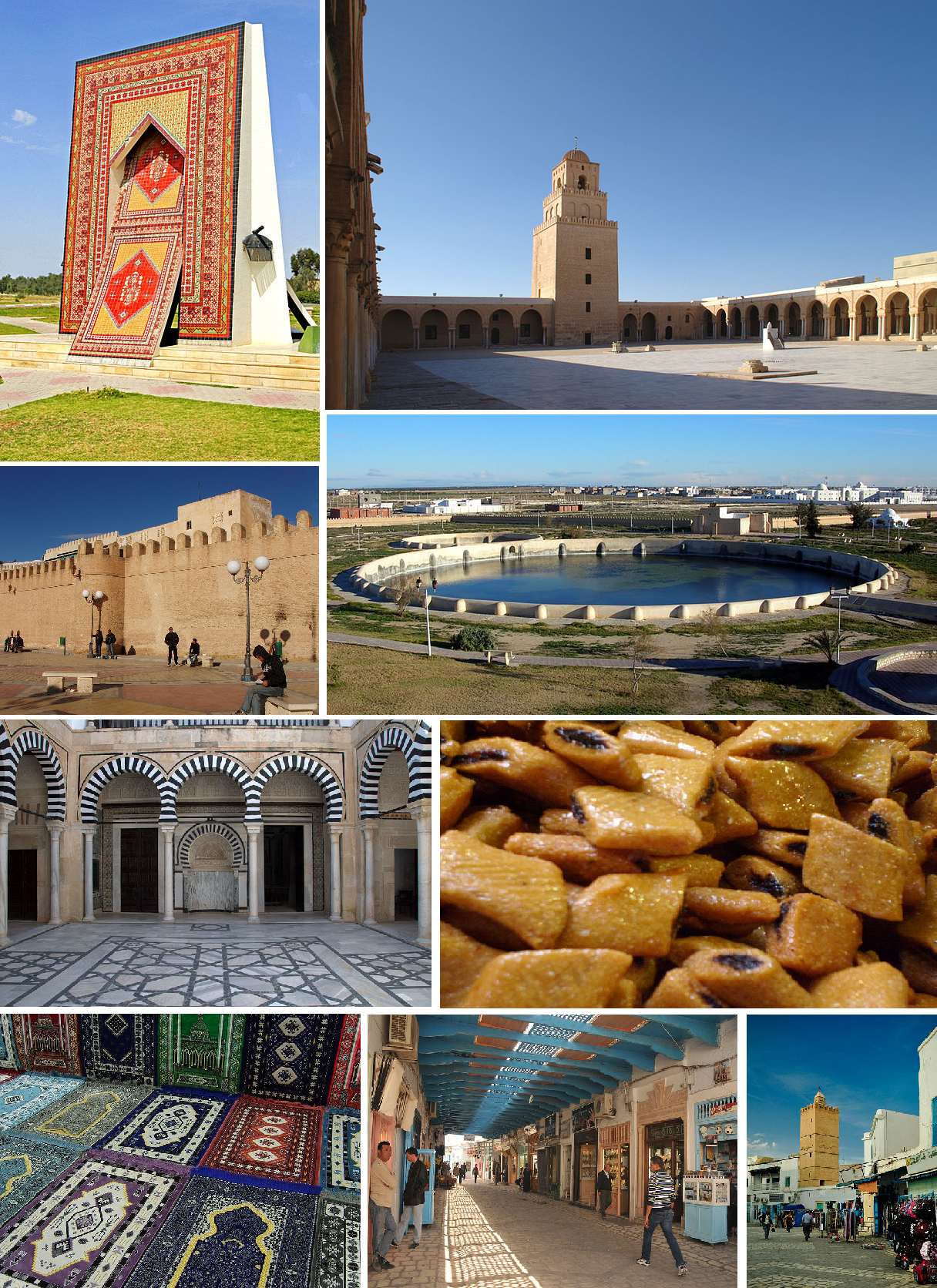
- Top (from left to right): Monument to Kairouan carpets, Great Mosque of Kairouan; Second row: Historic city walls, Aghlabid Basins; Third row: Zawiya of Sidi Abid al-Ghariani, Makroudh; Bottom: Kairouan carpets, Bazaar, Medina quarter

- Location in Tunisia Kairouan (Mediterranean) Kairouan (Africa)
- Coordinates: 35°40′38″N 10°06′03″E
- Country: Tunisia
- Governorate: Kairouan Governorate
- Delegation(s): Kairouan North, Kairouan South
- Founded: 670 CE
- Founder: Uqba ibn Nafi

Government
  - Mayor: Radouane Bouden (Ennahda)
- Elevation: 68 m (223 ft)

Population (2022)
  - Total: 210,313
- Postal code: 3100
- Website: Official website

UNESCO World Heritage Site
- Criteria: Cultural: i, ii, iii, v, vi
- Reference: 499
- Inscription: 1988 (12th Session)
- Area: 68.02 ha (168.1 acres)
- Buffer zone: 154.36 ha (381.4 acres)

Kairouan or Kairwan (UK: /ˌkaɪər(ʊ)ˈwɑːn/ KYRE(-uu)-WAHN, US: /kɛərˈ-/ kair-WAHN), also spelled El Qayrawān (Arabic: ٱلْقَيْرَوَان, romanized: al-Qayrawān, pronounced [æl qɑjrɑˈwæːn]; Tunisian Arabic: قيروان, romanized: Qiyrwān, pronounced [qɪrˈwɛːn]), is the capital of the Kairouan Governorate in Tunisia and a UNESCO World Heritage Site. The city was founded by the Umayyads around 670, in the period of Caliph Mu'awiya (reigned 661–680); this is when it became an important centre for Sunni Islamic scholarship and Quranic learning, attracting Muslims from various parts of the world. The Mosque of Uqba is situated in the city.

== Etymology ==
The name (ٱلْقَيْرَوَان al-Qayrawān) is an Arabic word meaning "military group" or "caravan", borrowed early on from the Middle Persian word kārawān (modern Persian کاروان kârvân), meaning "military column" (kâr "people/military" + vân "outpost") or "caravan" (see caravanserai). In Berber, the city used to be called تيكيروان Tikirwan, thought to be an adaptation of the Arabic name. It has also been romanized as Cairoan in early modern English.

== History ==
=== Foundation and early Islamic period ===
The foundation of Kairouan dates to about the year 670 when the Arab general Uqba ibn Nafi of Caliph Mu'awiya selected a site in the middle of a dense forest, then infested with wild beasts and reptiles, as the location of a military post for the conquest of the West. Formerly, the city of Kamounia was located where Kairouan now stands. It had housed a Byzantine garrison before the Arab conquest, and stood far from the sea – safe from the continued attacks of the Berbers who had fiercely resisted the Arab invasion. Berber resistance continued, led first by Kusaila, whose troops killed Uqba at Biskra about fifteen years after the establishment of the military post, and then by a Berber woman called Al-Kahina who was killed and her army defeated in 702. Subsequently, there occurred a mass conversion of the Berbers to Islam. Kharijites or Islamic "outsiders" who formed an egalitarian and puritanical sect appeared and are still present on the island of Djerba.

In October 741, in the course of the Great Berber Revolt in the Maghreb, the Ifriqiyan army, along with a Syrian force dispatched by the caliph, was destroyed by the Berbers at the Battle of Bagdoura. The governor Kulthum ibn Iyad al-Qasi perished in the field, his nephew and successor Balj ibn Bishr al-Qushayri was holed up with the remnant of the army in Spain, leaving the whole of Ifriqiya open to the advance of the Berber rebels. Not having any more forces at his disposal, the Umayyad Caliph Hisham quickly appointed Handhala ibn Safwan as governor of Ifriqiya, with supervisory authority over all the Maghreb (North Africa west of Egypt) and al-Andalus (Spain), and instructed him to take whatever forces he could gather to defend Ifriqiya and quash the Berber rebellion. Leaving Egypt in the hand of Hafs ibn al-Walid ibn Yusuf al-Hadrami, Handhala set out westwards in February 742, picking up additional forces from Barqa (Cyrenaica) and Tripoli (Tripolitana). He arrived in Kairouan around April, 742. The qadi of Ifriqiya, Abd al-Rahman ibn Oqba al-Ghaffari, had been managing the defense of Kairouan, and succeeded in fending off an attack by the Berber rebel army raised in southern Tunisia by the Sufrite leader Oqasha ibn Ayub al-Fezari. Handhala ibn Safwan arrived in Kairouan just as Oqasha was said to be mounting a new attack, in coordination with another large Berber army coming in from the west, led by Abd al-Wahid ibn Yazid al-Hawwari. The Berber rebel armies were to make junction in front of Kairouan, before launching their final attack on the city. Wasting no time, Handhala dispatched a cavalry force to slow down Abd al-Wahid's progress, and threw the bulk of his forces south, defeating Oqasha in a bloody battle at El-Qarn and taking him prisoner. But Handhala had taken a lot of losses himself, and now faced the unhappy prospect of Abd al-Wahid's gigantic army, said to be some 300,000, ostensibly the largest Berber army ever seen. Hurrying back, Handhala is said to have put the entire population of Kairouan under arms to bolster his ranks, before setting out again. In perhaps the bloodiest encounter in the Berber wars, Handhala ibn Safwan defeated the great Berber army of Abd al-Wahid ibn Yazid at al-Asnam in May 742 (perhaps a little later), just three miles outside of Kairouan. Some 120,000–180,000 Berbers, including Abd al-Wahid, fell in the field of battle in that single encounter.

=== Aghlabid period ===
In 745, Kharijite Berbers captured Kairouan, which was already at that time a developed city with luxuriant gardens and olive groves. Power struggles continued until Ibrahim ibn al-Aghlab recaptured Kairouan at the end of the 8th century.

In 800 Caliph Harun ar-Rashid in Baghdad confirmed Ibrahim as emir and hereditary ruler of Ifriqiya. Ibrahim ibn al-Aghlab founded the Aghlabid dynasty which ruled Ifriqiya between 800 and 909. The new emirs embellished Kairouan and made it their capital. It soon became famous for its wealth and prosperity, reaching the levels of Basra and Kufa and giving Tunisia a period of power and prosperity.

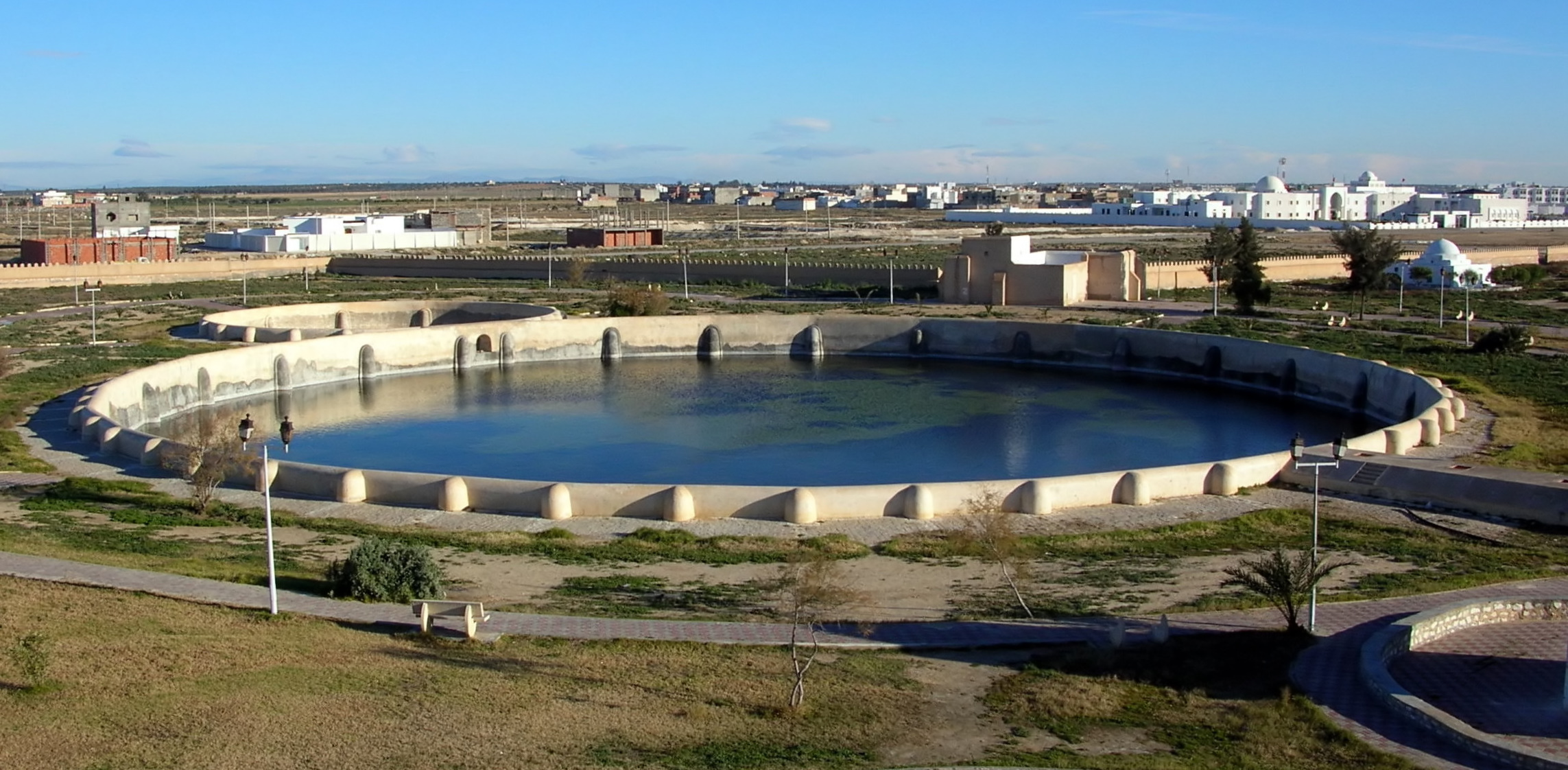
The Aghlabid Basins

The Aghlabids rebuilt the great mosque and established in it a university that was a centre of education both in Islamic thought and in the secular sciences. Its role can be compared to that of the University of Paris in the Middle Ages. In the 9th century, the city became a brilliant focus of Arab and Islamic cultures attracting scholars from all over the Islamic World. In that period Imam Sahnun and Asad ibn al-Furat made of Kairouan a temple of knowledge and a magnificent centre of diffusion of Islamic sciences. The Aghlabids also built palaces, fortifications and fine waterworks of which only the pools remain. From Kairouan envoys from Charlemagne and the Holy Roman Empire returned with glowing reports of the Aghlabid palaces, libraries and gardens – and from the crippling taxation imposed to pay for their drunkenness and sundry debaucheries. The Aghlabids also pacified the country and conquered Sicily in 827.

=== Fatimid and Zirid period ===
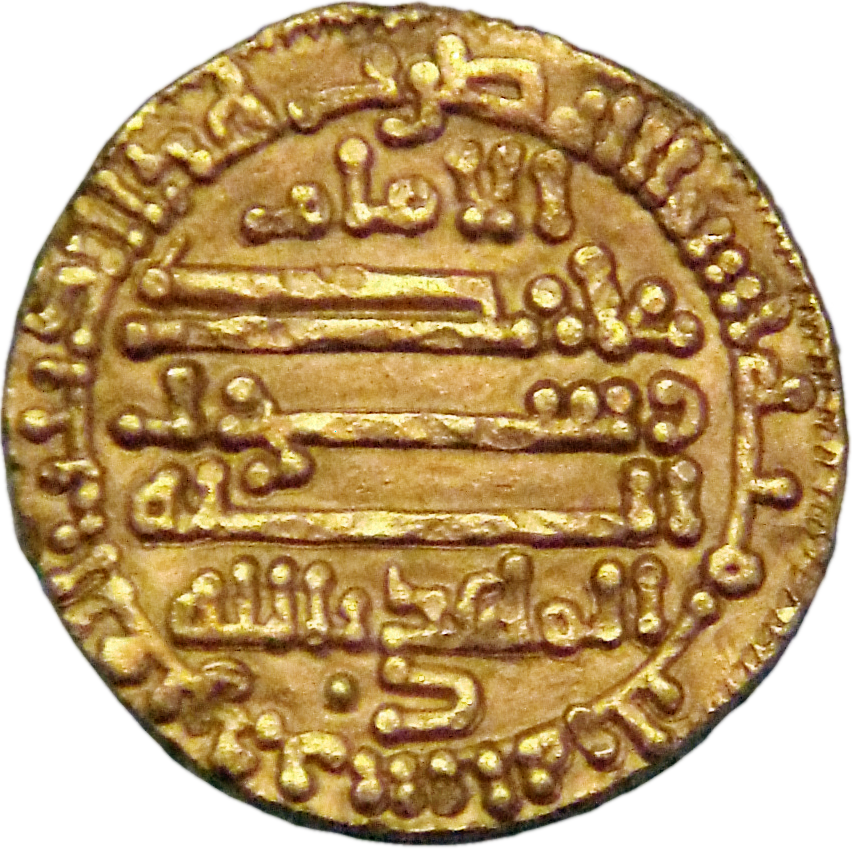
Gold coin of the Fatimid Caliph Al-Mahdi Billah, minted in Kairouan in 912 CE

In 893, through the mission of Abdullah al Mahdi, the Kutama Berbers from the west of the country started the movement of the Shiite Fatimids. The year 909 saw the overthrow of the Sunni Aghlabids who ruled Ifriqiya and the establishment of the Fatimid dynasty. During the rule of the Fatimids, Kairouan was neglected and lost its importance: the new rulers resided first in Raqqada but soon moved their capital to the newly built Al Mahdiyah on the eastern coast of Tunisia. After succeeding in extending their rule over all of central Maghreb, an area consisting of the modern countries of Morocco, Algeria, Tunisia and Libya, they eventually moved east to Egypt to found Cairo making it the capital of their vast Caliphate and leaving the Zirids as their vassals in Ifriqiya. Governing again from Kairouan, the Zirids led the country through another artistic, commercial and agricultural heyday. Schools and universities flourished, overseas trade in local manufactures and farm produce ran high and the courts of the Zirids rulers were centres of refinement that eclipsed those of their European contemporaries. When the Zirids declared their independence from Cairo and their conversion to Sunni Islam in 1045 by giving allegiance to Baghdad, the Fatimid Caliph Ma'ad al-Mustansir Billah sent as punishment hordes of troublesome Arab tribes (Banu Hilal and Banu Sulaym) to invade Ifriqiya. These invaders so utterly captured Kairouan from the Zirids in 1057 and destroyed it that it never regained its former importance and their influx was a major factor in the spread of nomadism in areas where agriculture had previously been dominant. Some 1,700 years of intermittent but continual progress was undone within a decade as in most part of the country the land was laid to waste for nearly two centuries.

=== Later history ===
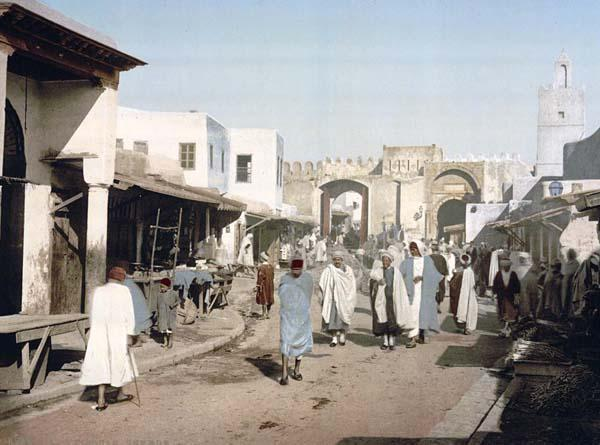
Bab Chouhada Street in 1899

Al-Idrisi described the city in the 12th century:

The city of Kairouan is the mother of settlements and the capital of regions. It was once the greatest city of the West in its expanse, the most populous, the wealthiest, the most prosperous, the most finely built, and the most ambitious, with the most profitable trade, the highest tax revenues, the most flourishing markets, and the greatest commercial gains, while its people were also the most rebellious and the most arrogant of the ignorant, yet among its virtuous elite, the dominant qualities were adherence to righteousness, fulfillment of covenants, avoidance of doubtful matters, abstention from prohibitions, mastery of refined sciences, and an inclination toward moderation. But God Almighty afflicted it with the Arabs, and calamities befell it one after another, until nothing remained of it but fading ruins and obliterated traces. In our present time, only a portion of it is enclosed by an earthen wall. Its rulers are Arabs, who collect whatever revenues remain. A few people still reside there, engaged in modest trade with meager benefits. Scholars speculate that it will soon return to its former state of prosperity and grandeur. Its water supply is scarce, and its inhabitants drink from the great cistern (majel) within the city. This cistern is an architectural marvel, as it is built in a square shape with a tower-like structure rising in the center. Each side measures two hundred cubits, and it remains filled with water. Kairouan was originally two cities: one was Kairouan itself, and the other was Sabra. Sabra was the royal residence, and at the height of its prosperity, it contained three hundred baths—most of them private, while the rest were public for all people. Sabra, however, is now in complete ruin, devoid of any inhabitants.

In the 13th century under the prosperous Hafsids dynasty that ruled Ifriqiya, the city started to emerge from its ruins. It is only under the Husainid dynasty that Kairouan started to find an honorable place in the country and throughout the Islamic world.

In 1881, Kairouan was taken by the French, after which non-Muslims were allowed access to the city. The French built the 600 mm (1 ft 11 5/8 in) Sousse–Kairouan Decauville railway, which operated from 1882 to 1996, before it was regauged to 1,000 mm (3 ft 3 3/8 in) gauge.

The old city of Kairouan and its associated historic monuments became a UNESCO World Heritage Site in 1988.

In December 2023, about 30m of wall near the Gate of the Leather Workers collapsed during restoration. Three masons were killed, and several others injured.

== Geography ==
=== Location ===
Kairouan, the capital of Kairouan Governorate, lies west of Sousse, 50 km (31 mi) from the east coast, 75 km (47 mi) from Monastir and 184 km (114 mi) from Tunis.

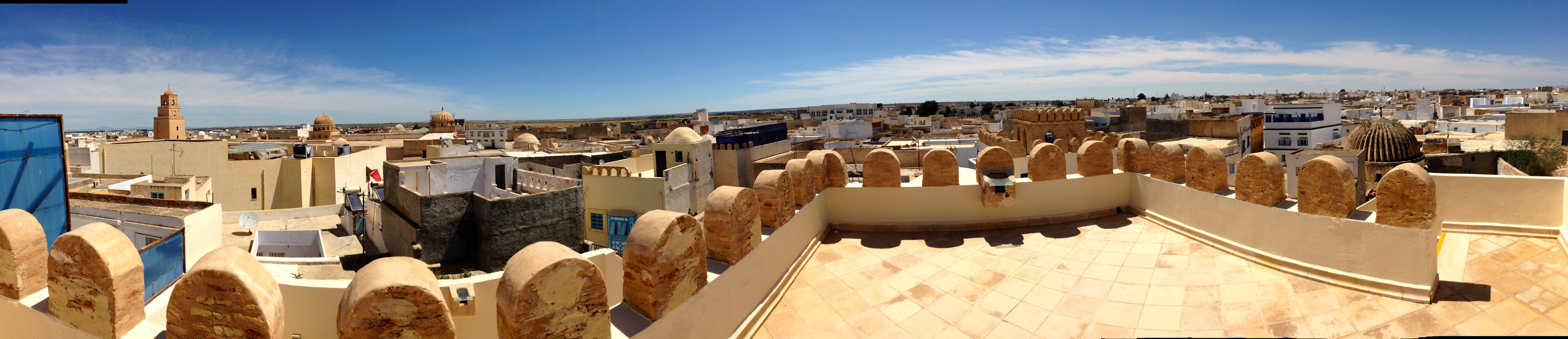
Paranoma of the old city of Kairouan

=== Climate ===
Kairouan has a hot semi-arid climate (Köppen climate classification BSh).

Climate data for Kairouan (1991-2020, extremes 1901-2023)
| Month | Jan | Feb | Mar | Apr | May | Jun | Jul | Aug | Sep | Oct | Nov | Dec | Year |
|---|---|---|---|---|---|---|---|---|---|---|---|---|---|
| Record high °C (°F) | 30.0 (86.0) | 37.3 (99.1) | 39.2 (102.6) | 37.8 (100.0) | 44.6 (112.3) | 48.0 (118.4) | 49.2 (120.6) | 50.3 (122.5) | 45.0 (113.0) | 41.3 (106.3) | 36.0 (96.8) | 30.9 (87.6) | 50.3 (122.5) |
| Mean daily maximum °C (°F) | 17.8 (64.0) | 18.6 (65.5) | 21.7 (71.1) | 24.9 (76.8) | 29.7 (85.5) | 34.7 (94.5) | 38.1 (100.6) | 37.9 (100.2) | 32.6 (90.7) | 28.2 (82.8) | 22.8 (73.0) | 18.8 (65.8) | 27.1 (80.8) |
| Daily mean °C (°F) | 12.6 (54.7) | 13.2 (55.8) | 15.8 (60.4) | 18.6 (65.5) | 22.9 (73.2) | 27.4 (81.3) | 30.5 (86.9) | 30.7 (87.3) | 26.8 (80.2) | 22.7 (72.9) | 17.5 (63.5) | 13.8 (56.8) | 21.0 (69.8) |
| Mean daily minimum °C (°F) | 7.4 (45.3) | 7.8 (46.0) | 9.9 (49.8) | 12.4 (54.3) | 16.0 (60.8) | 20.0 (68.0) | 22.9 (73.2) | 23.5 (74.3) | 21.0 (69.8) | 17.3 (63.1) | 12.2 (54.0) | 8.8 (47.8) | 14.9 (58.8) |
| Record low °C (°F) | −4.5 (23.9) | −3.0 (26.6) | −3.0 (26.6) | 0.0 (32.0) | 4.0 (39.2) | 6.5 (43.7) | 8.0 (46.4) | 12.0 (53.6) | 9.0 (48.2) | 5.5 (41.9) | −3.0 (26.6) | −3.5 (25.7) | −4.5 (23.9) |
| Average precipitation mm (inches) | 24.4 (0.96) | 19.9 (0.78) | 32.6 (1.28) | 27.0 (1.06) | 24.6 (0.97) | 12.2 (0.48) | 5.0 (0.20) | 16.4 (0.65) | 56.1 (2.21) | 41.0 (1.61) | 25.4 (1.00) | 27.5 (1.08) | 312.1 (12.29) |
| Average precipitation days (≥ 1.0 mm) | 3.4 | 3.4 | 4.4 | 4.3 | 3.4 | 1.9 | 0.6 | 2.2 | 5.0 | 3.7 | 3.1 | 3.8 | 38.8 |
| Average relative humidity (%) | 64 | 62 | 62 | 61 | 58 | 53 | 49 | 53 | 59 | 65 | 65 | 65 | 60 |
| Mean monthly sunshine hours | 192.9 | 194.6 | 226.9 | 242.8 | 292.6 | 316.7 | 350.4 | 320.5 | 248.6 | 230.7 | 203.7 | 185.7 | 3,006.1 |
| Mean daily sunshine hours | 6.0 | 6.8 | 7.3 | 8.4 | 9.7 | 10.8 | 11.7 | 10.8 | 9.0 | 7.6 | 6.9 | 6.0 | 8.4 |
Source 1: Institut National de la Météorologie (humidity 1961-1990, sun 1981–2010, extremes 1951–2017) (Note: The Station ID for Kairouan is 33535111.)
Source 2: NOAA (humidity/daily sun 1961–1990), Deutscher Wetterdienst (extremes, 1901–1990)

== Demographics ==
In 2014, the city had about 187,000 inhabitants.

== Religion ==
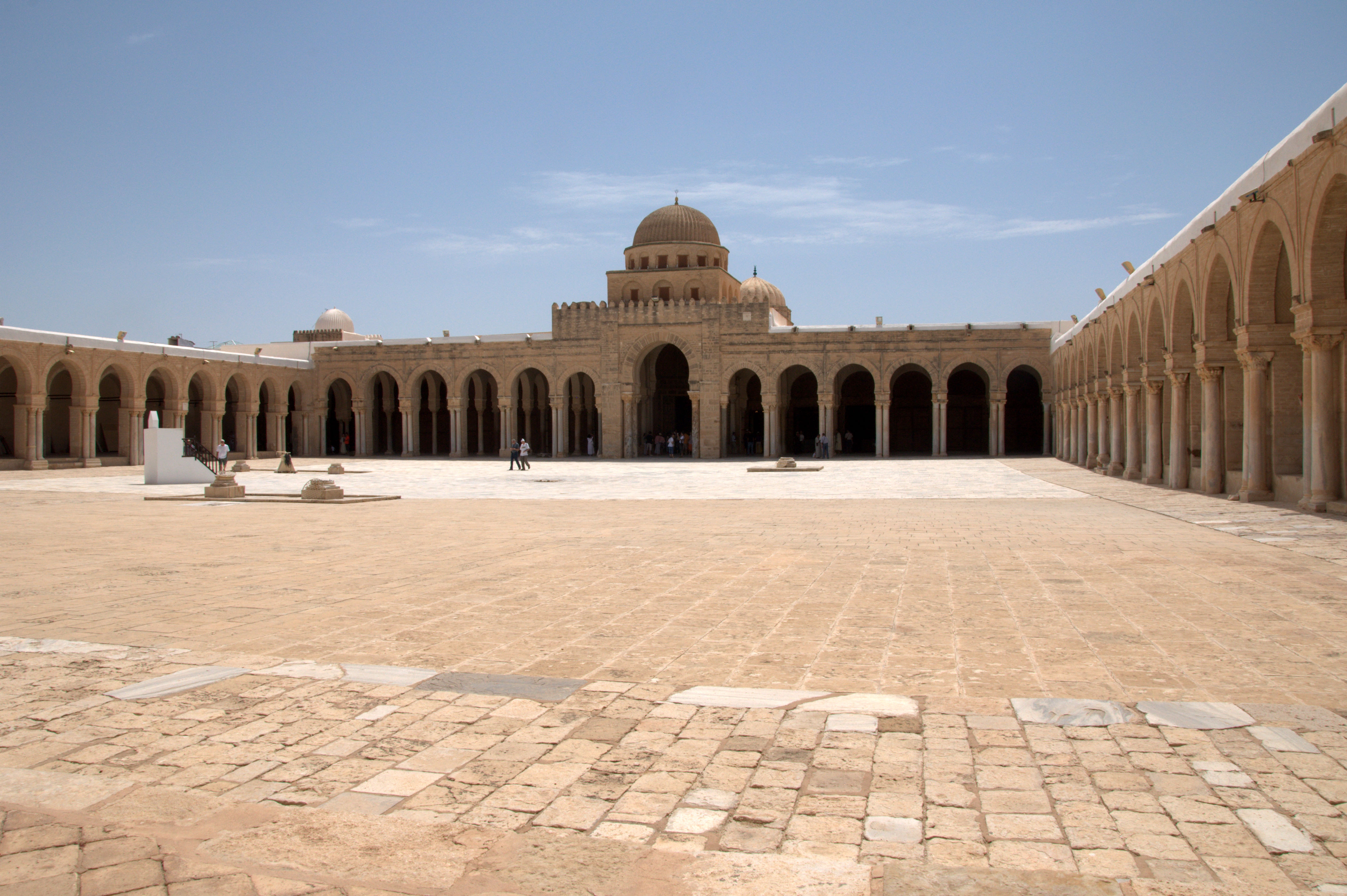
The Great Mosque of Kairouan also known as the Mosque of Uqba (Great Mosque of Sidi-Uqba)

Between the 9th and 11th centuries AD, Kairouan functioned as one of the great centers of Islamic civilization and gained a reputation as a hotbed of scholarship across the entire Maghreb. During this period, the Great Mosque of Kairouan became both a place of prayer and a center for teaching Islamic sciences under the Maliki current. A unique religious tradition practiced in Kairouan was the use of Islamic law to enforce monogamy by stipulating it in the marriage contract. Local tradition holds that seven pilgrimages to the Great Mosque equals one pilgrimage to Mecca. According to some, this makes Kairouan the fourth holiest city in Islam after Mecca, Medina and Jerusalem. (Note: Various other cities across the world are also claimed to be the fourth holiest city in Islam, including Damascus, Hebron, Bukhara, and Harar.) As of 2004, the city contained 89 mosques. Sufi festivals are held in the city in memory of saints.

Before the arrival of the French in 1881, non-Muslims were forbidden from living in Kairouan. A Christian community had existed during the early 11th century alongside Jews who were among the original settlers of Kairouan. The Jewish community's golden era began in the late 8th century and lasted until the early 11th century during which time it played an important role in Jewish history, having been a world center of Talmudic and Halakhic scholarship for at least three generations. The Banu Hilal conquest of Kairouan in 1057 led to the decline of the medieval community with Jews only returning after Tunisia was established as a French protectorate in 1881. By the 1960s the community had disappeared, and all that remains is their dilapidated cemetery.

== Main sights ==
=== Great Mosque of Kairouan ===
The city's main landmark is the Great Mosque of Sidi-Uqba (also known as the Great Mosque of Kairouan) which is one of the most impressive and largest Islamic monuments in North Africa. Originally built when Kairouan was founded in 670 AD. The Great Mosque underwent several renovations and expansions before being substantially rebuilt under the Aghlabid dynasty in the 9th century. The mosque currently occupies an area of over 9,000 square metres (97,000 sq ft) and is one of the oldest places of worship in the Islamic world. The mosque became a center of education both in Islamic thought and in the secular sciences and helped the city to develop and expand.

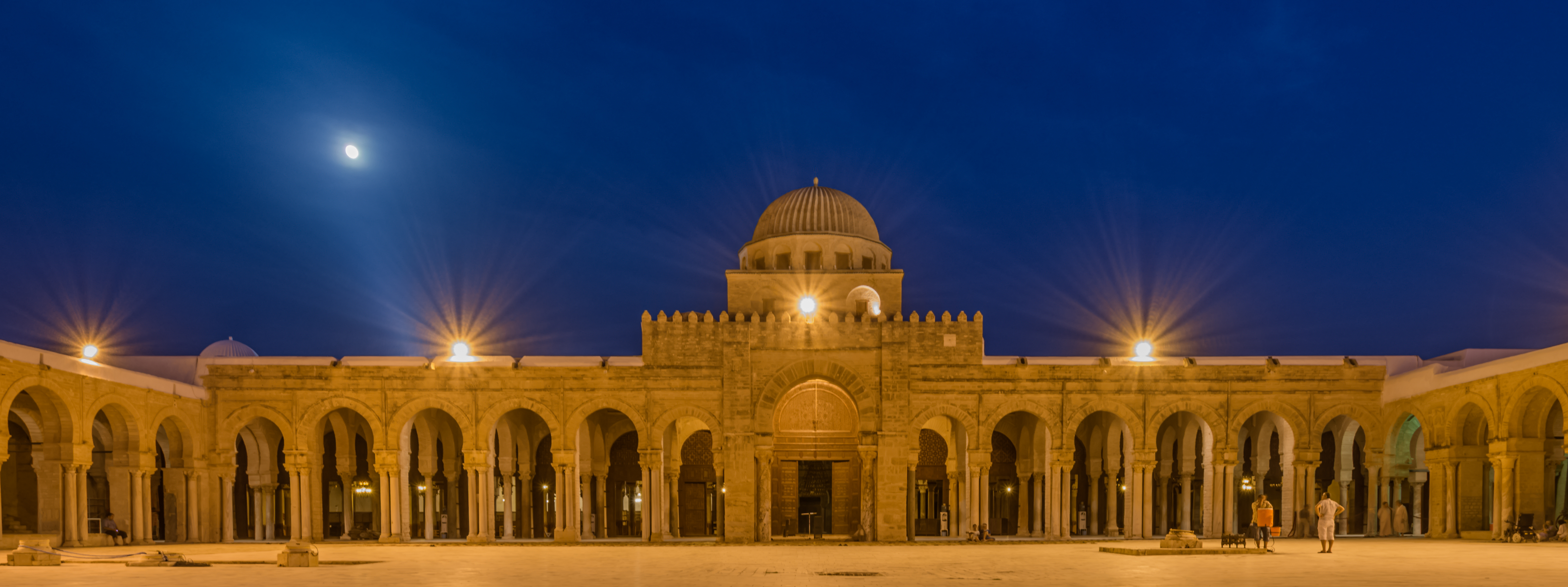
Paranoma of Great Mosque of Kairouan

=== Mosque of the Three Doors ===
The Mosque of the Three Doors was founded in 866 during the Aghlabid period. Its façade is a notable example of Islamic architecture. It has three arched doorways surmounted by three inscriptions in Kufic script, interspersed with floral and geometrical reliefs and topped by a carved frieze; the first inscription includes the verses 70–71 in the sura 33 of Quran. The small minaret was added during the restoration works held under the Hafsid dynasty. The prayer hall has a nave and two aisles, divided by arched columns, parallel to the qibla wall.

=== Mosque of the Barber ===
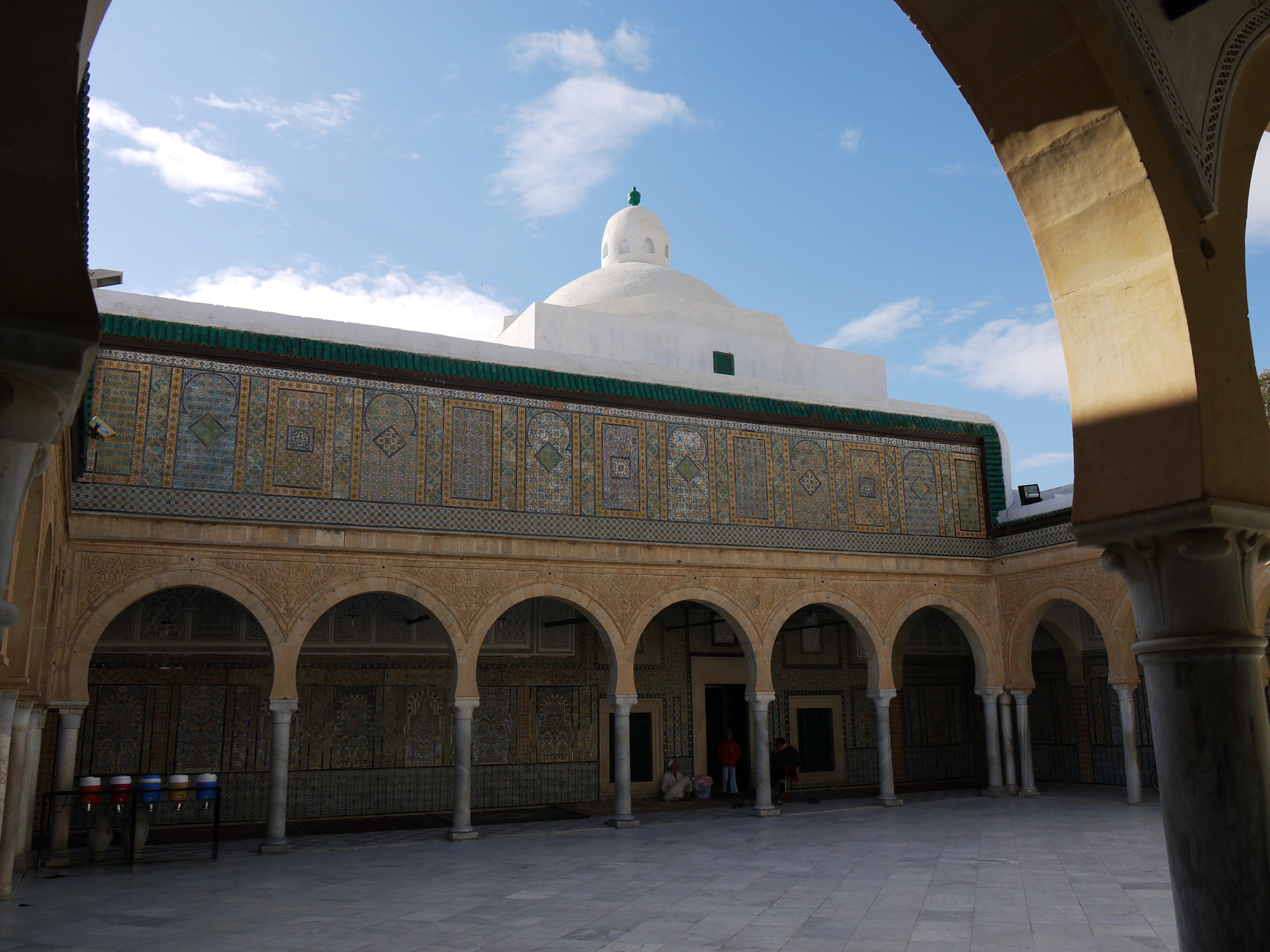
Mosque of the Barber

The Zawiya of Sidi Sahib, also known as the Mosque of the Barber, is a religious complex containing the mausoleum of Abu Zama' al-Balawi, a companion of the Islamic prophet Muhammad, who, according to legend, had saved for himself three hairs of Muhammad's beard, hence the edifice's name. The complex was first built up in the 14th century under the Hafsids, but in its present state it dates from the 17th century, under the Muradids. The tomb chamber is accessed from a cloister-like court with rich tile and stucco decoration. In addition to the mausoleum, the complex includes a madrasa and several other facilities.

=== Aghlabid basins ===
The Aghlabid basins are a Tunisian historical monument located in Kairouan. Dating from the 9th century and located outside the ramparts of the medina of Kairouan, they are considered to be the most important hydraulic systems in the history of the Muslim world. The structure covers an area of 11,000 square meters and consists of a small settling basin, a large basin for storing water and two drawing tanks, all having a total storage capacity of 68,800 cubic meters.

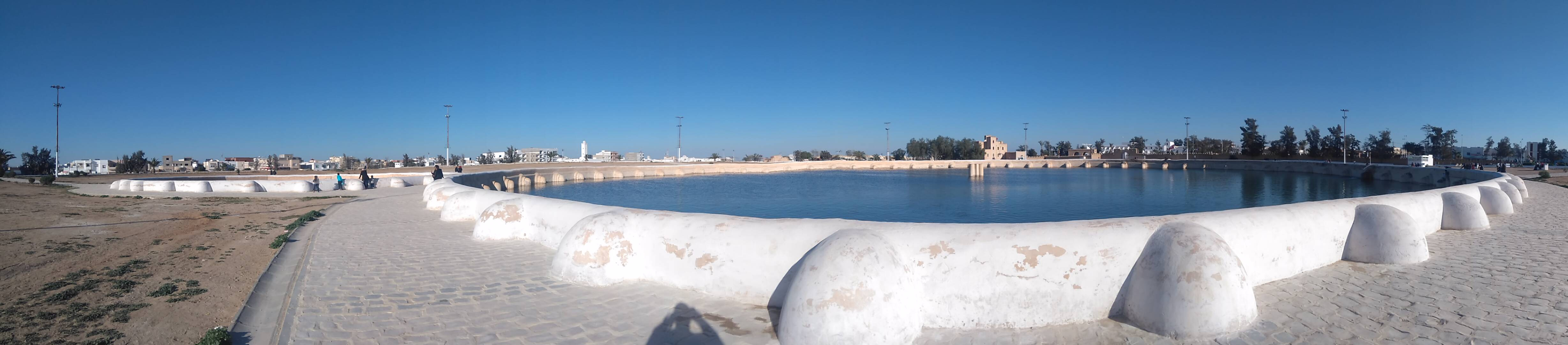
The Aghlabid Basins

== Economy ==
The primary economic sectors in Kairouan are industry, agriculture and tourism.

=== Industry ===
The Kairouan region currently has 167 industrial companies offering more than 10,000 jobs, of which 33 are fully exporters. The industrial activities of the region are quite diversified, although the agrifood industry sector is preeminent with 91 units.

=== Agriculture ===
The governorate of Kairouan is known mainly for the production of vegetables (peppers, tomatoes) and fruits (apricots, almonds and olives). It is the leading national producer of chili peppers with nearly 90,000 tonnes in 2019, as well as apricots with more than 15,000 tonnes.

=== Tourism ===
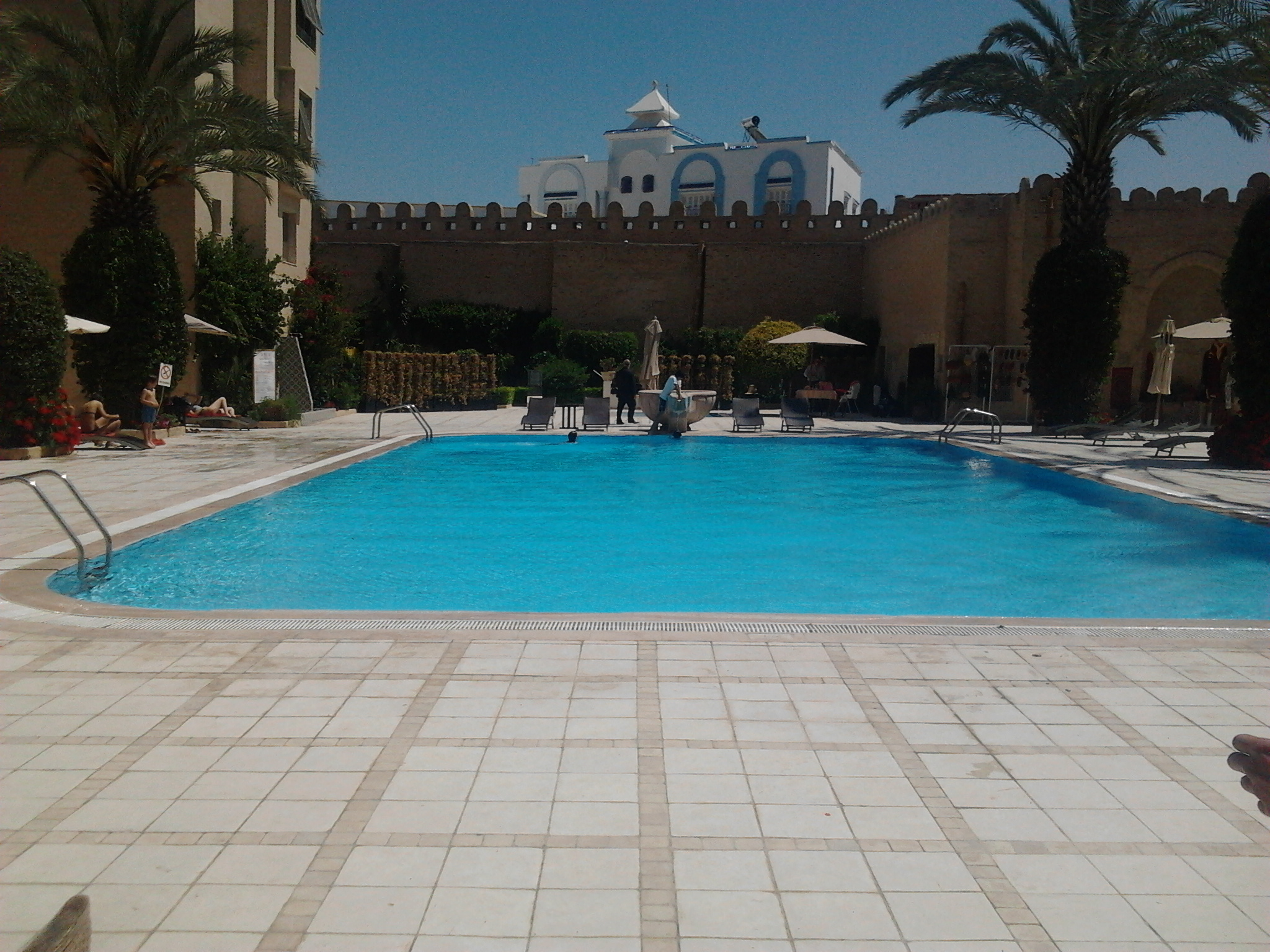
Kasba Hotel

Kairouan is one of the four most visited sites in Tunisia along with Carthage, El Jem and Le Bardo as historic sites. Tourist activity is focused on the historic sites and monuments of the city of Kairouan.

== Food ==
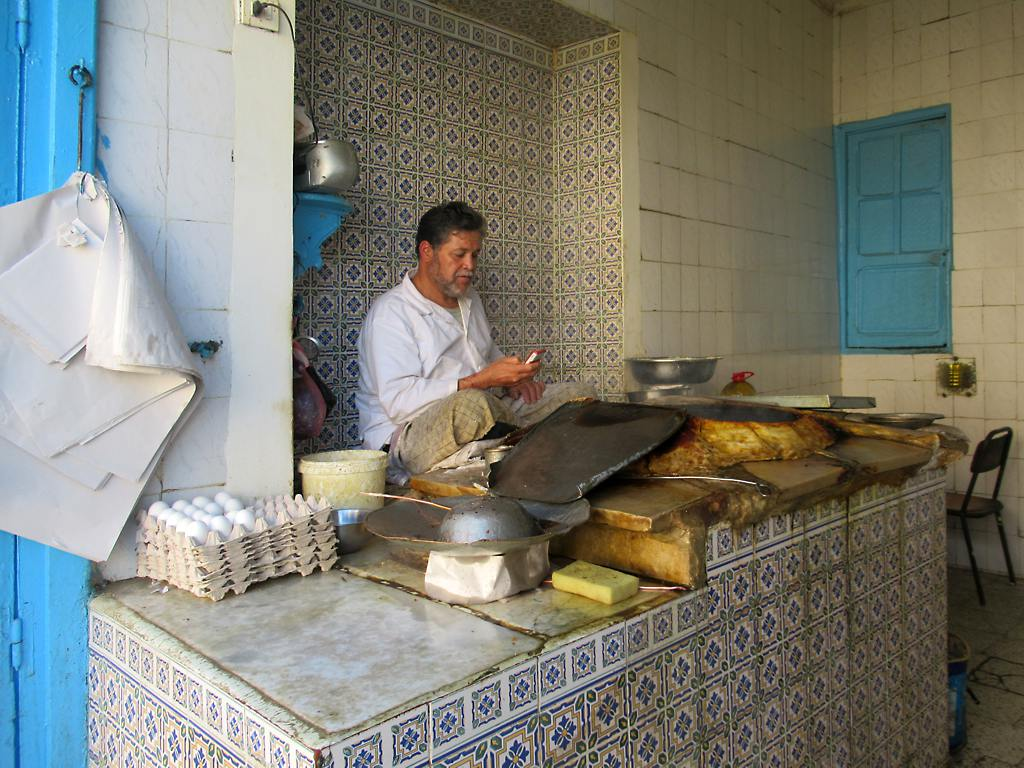
Traditional fast food maker in Kairouan

Kairouan is known for its pastries (e.g. zlebia and makroudh).

== In popular culture ==
Kairouan was used as a filming location for the 1981 film Raiders of the Lost Ark, standing in for Cairo. As the film is set in 1936, television antennas throughout the city were taken down for the duration of filming.

== Notable people ==
- Su'da – historically attested Berber princess supposedly died there.
- Najla Bouden – 17th Prime Minister of Tunisia (first female prime minister in the Arab world).
- Habib Galhia, boxer
- Habiba Ghribi, athlete
- Fatima al-Fihriya, founder of the first university in the world.
- Salih al-Souissi al-Qayrawani (1871–1941), writer and activist

== Twin towns ==
| Fès, Morocco, since 22 October 1965; Tlemcen, Algeria, since 28 May 1969; Córdoba, Spain, since 10 June 1969; Cairo, Egypt, since 14 March 1976 | Samarkand, Uzbekistan, since 5 October 1977; Timbuktu, Mali, since 2 June 1986; Bursa, Turkey, since 26 December 1987; Nishapur, Iran, since 26 December 1987 |

== Gallery ==
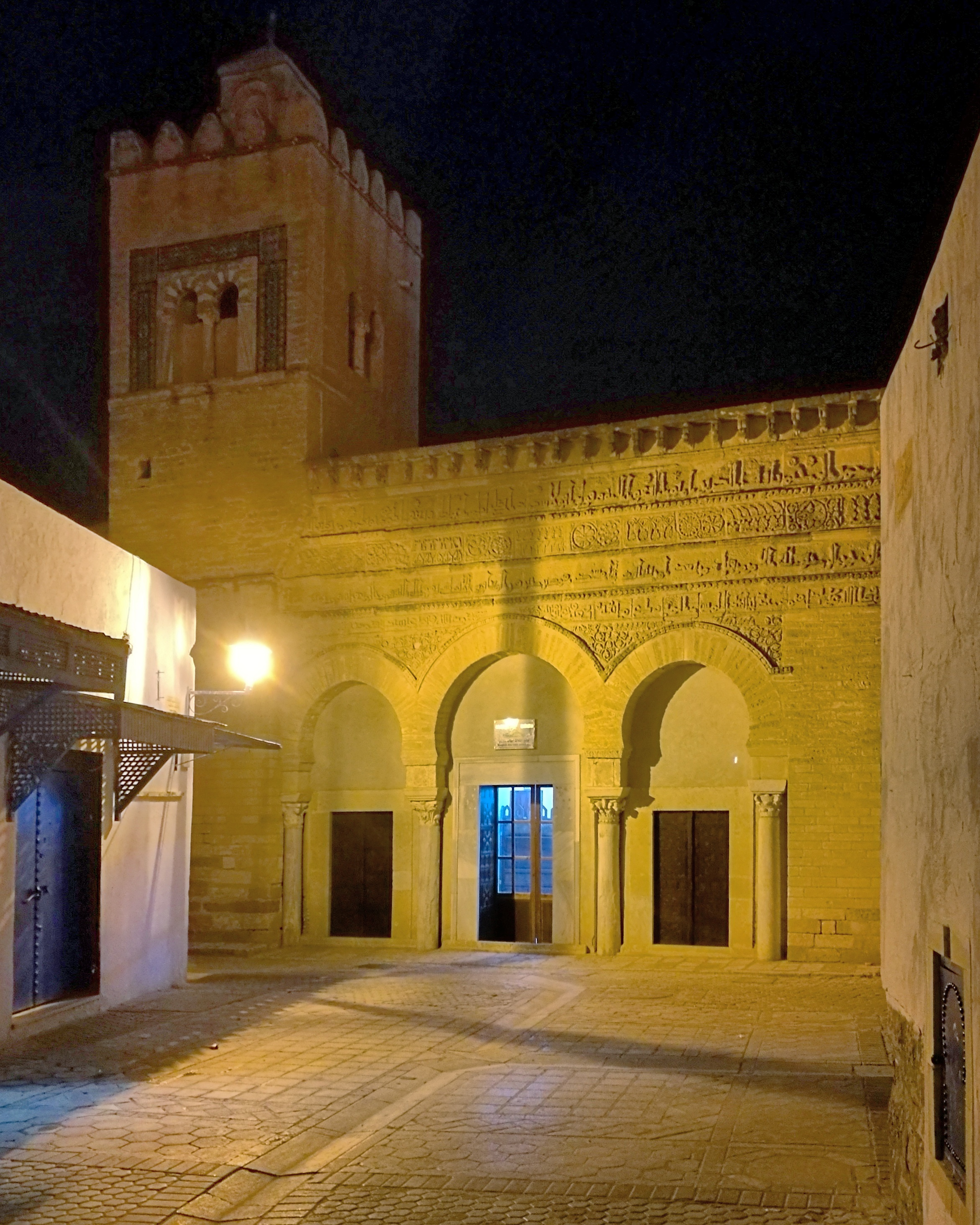
Mosque of the Three Doors

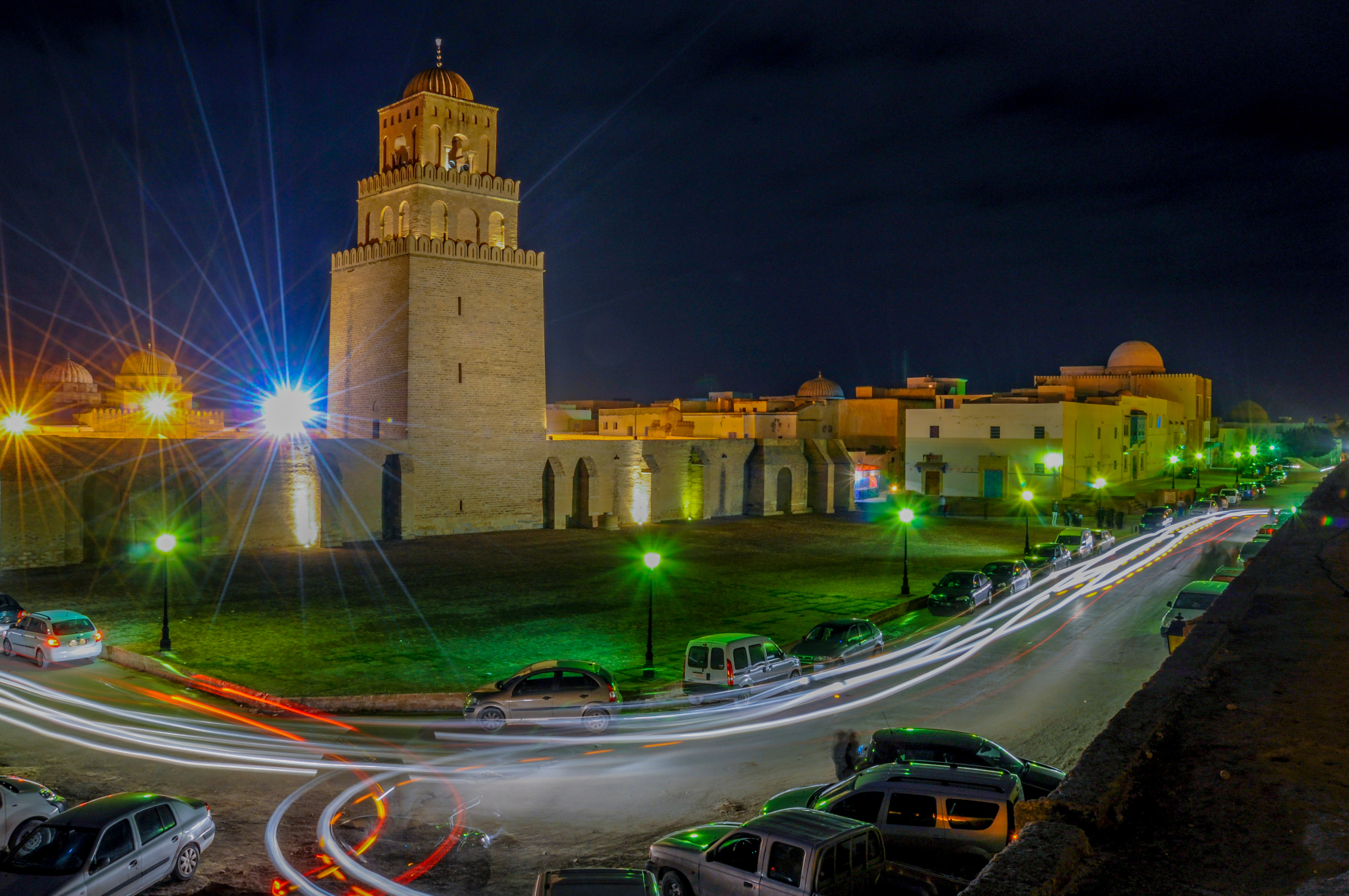
Great Mosque in night

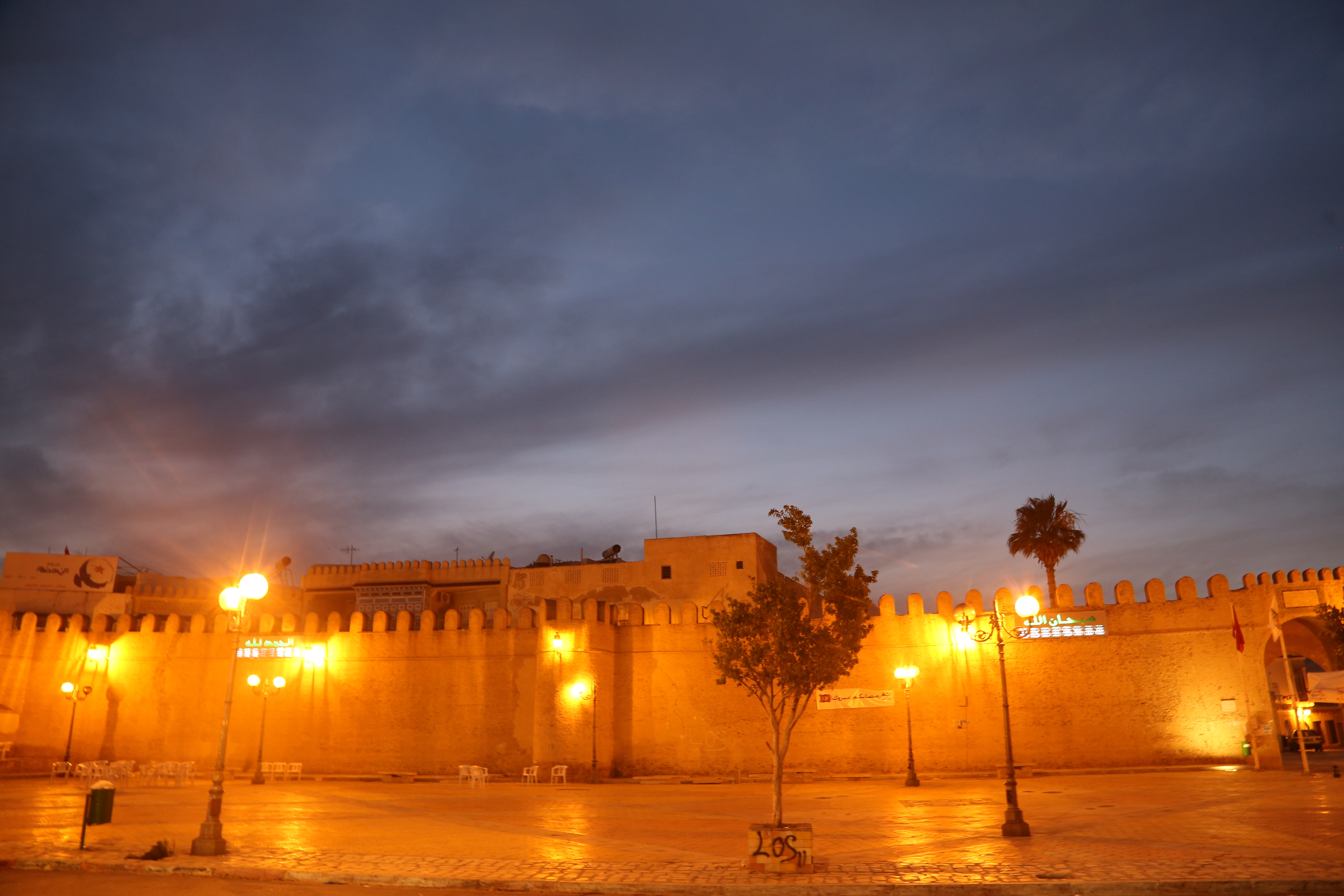
Remparts en flame

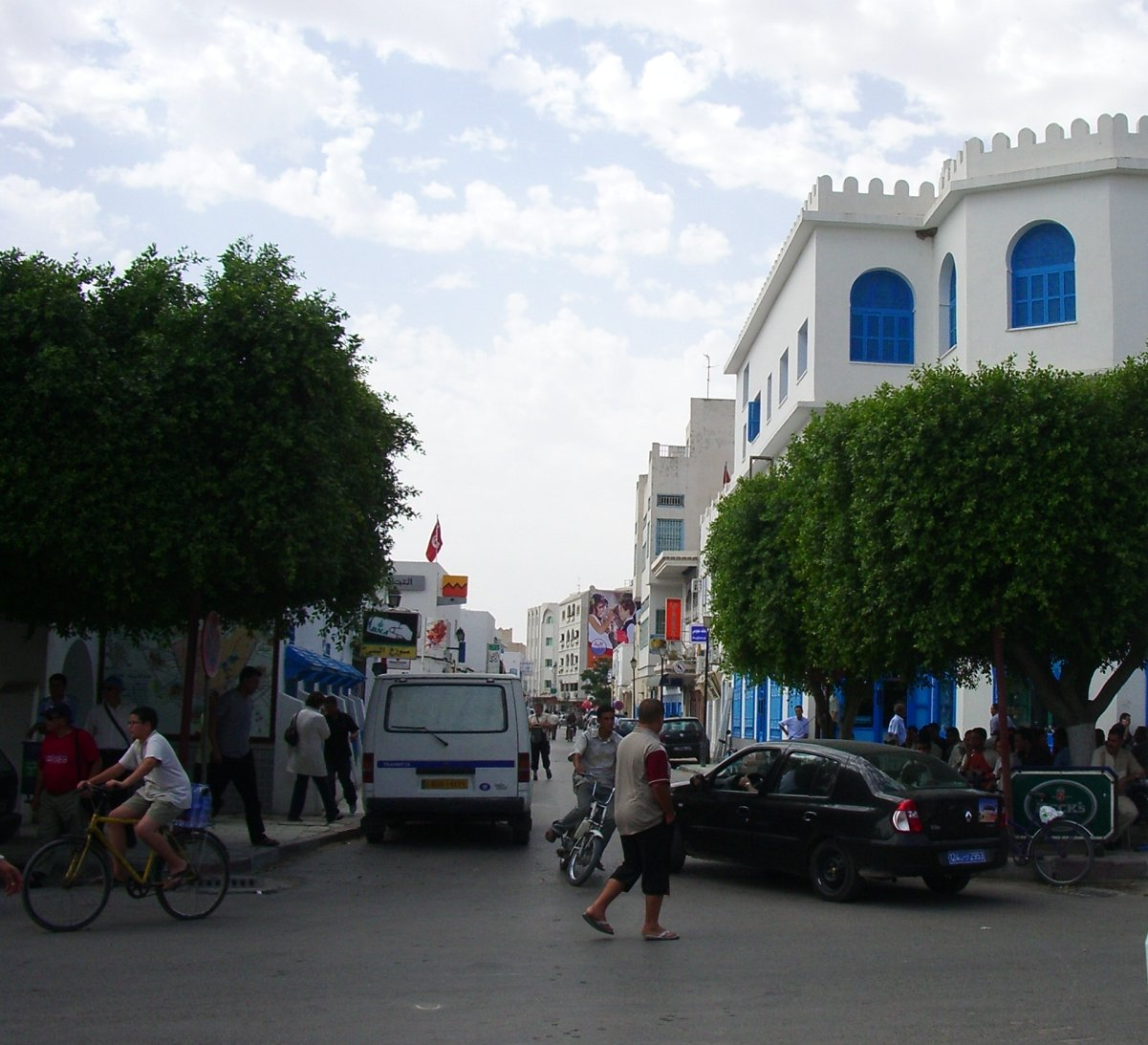
Kairouan Center-Ville

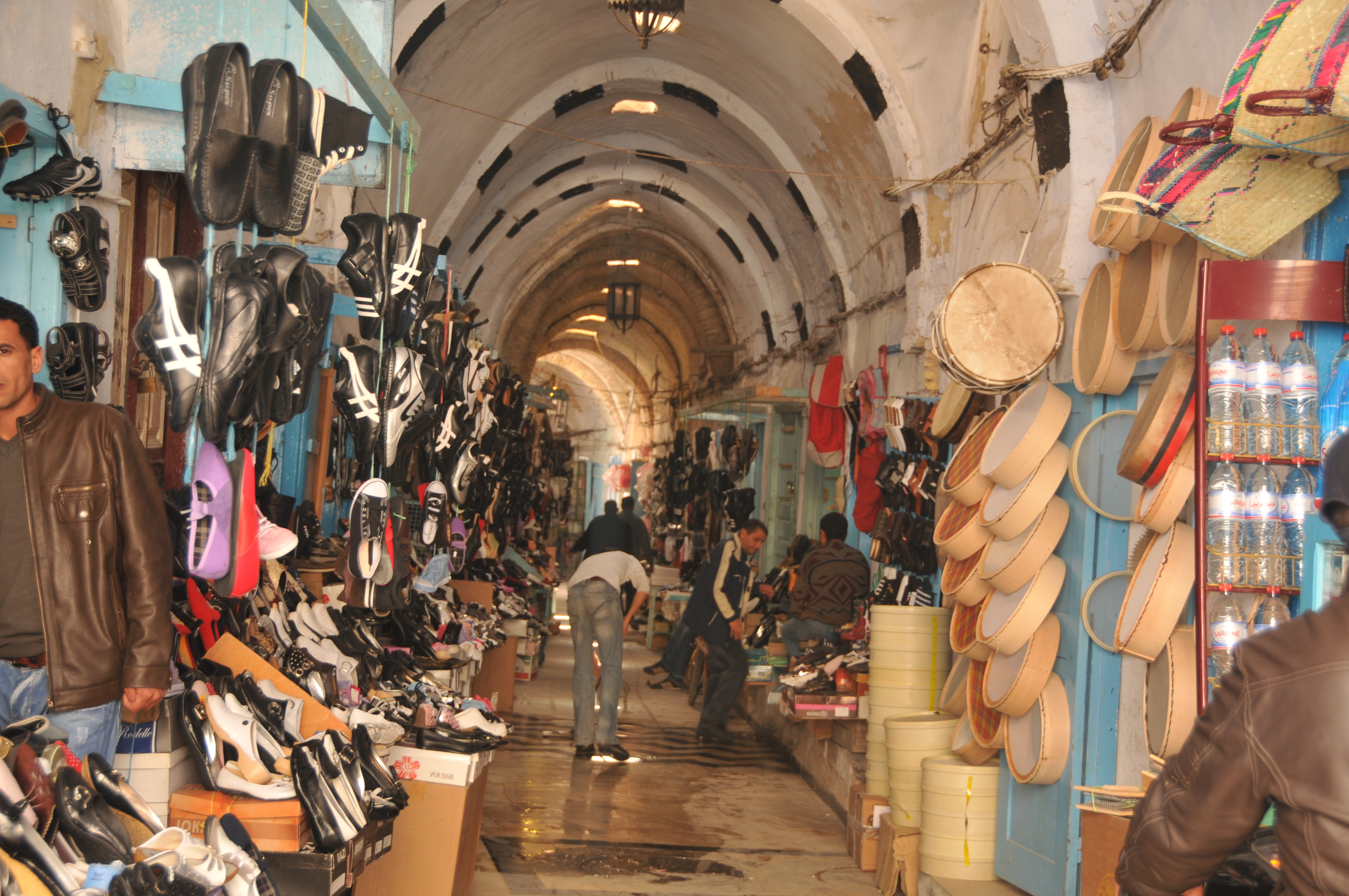
Souk of Kairouan

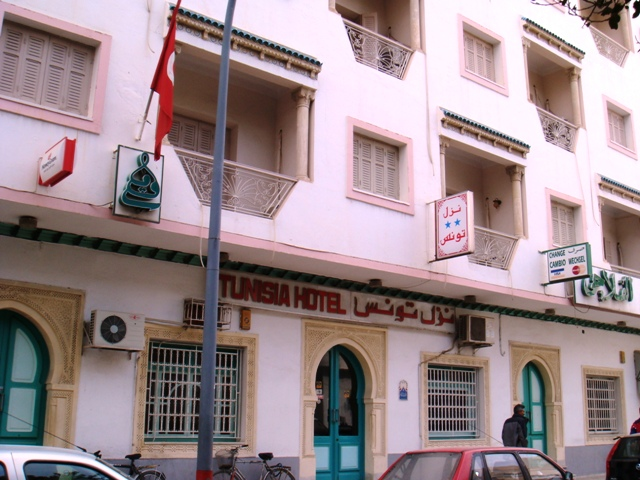
Tunisia Hotel

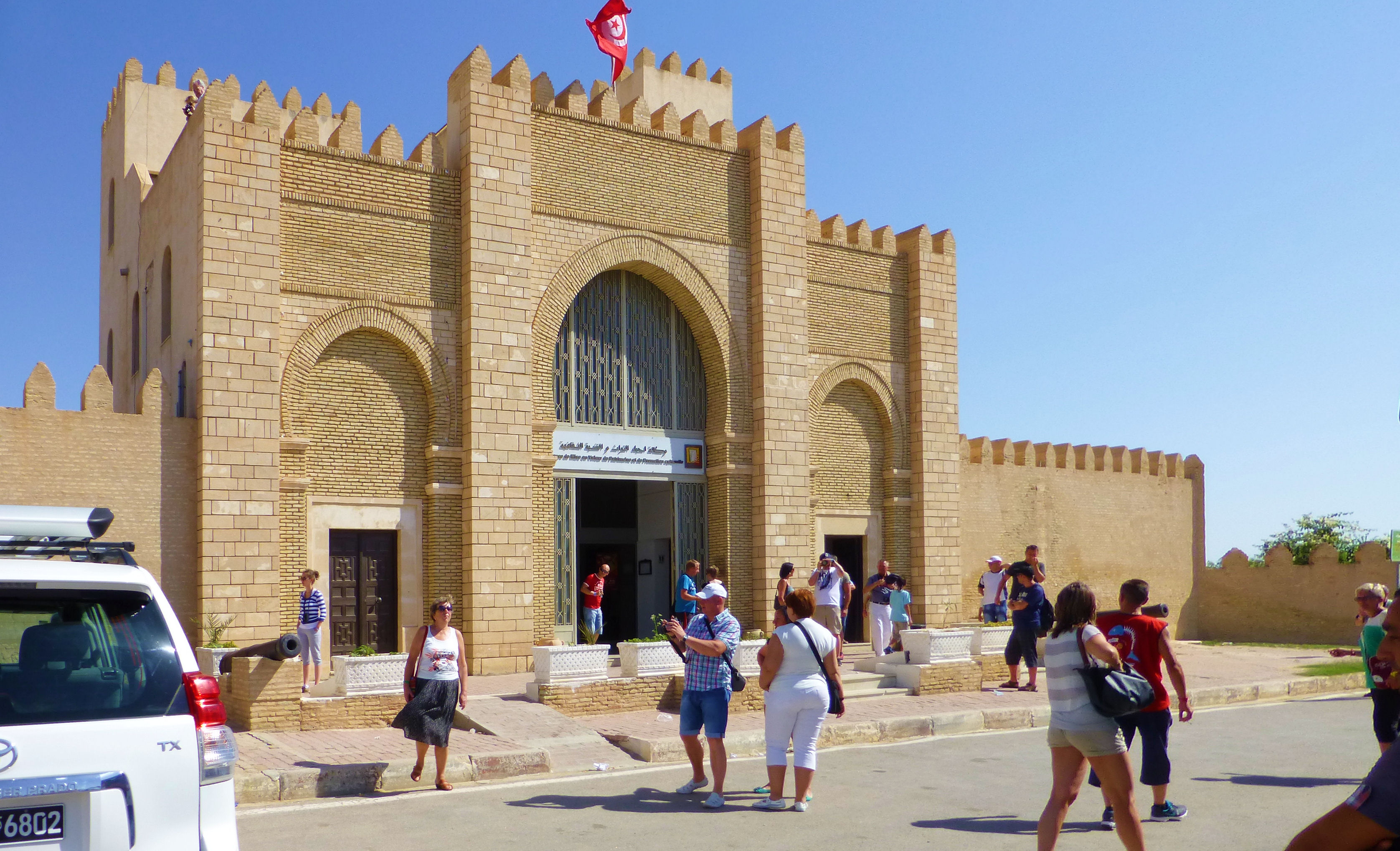
Piscines des Aghlabides

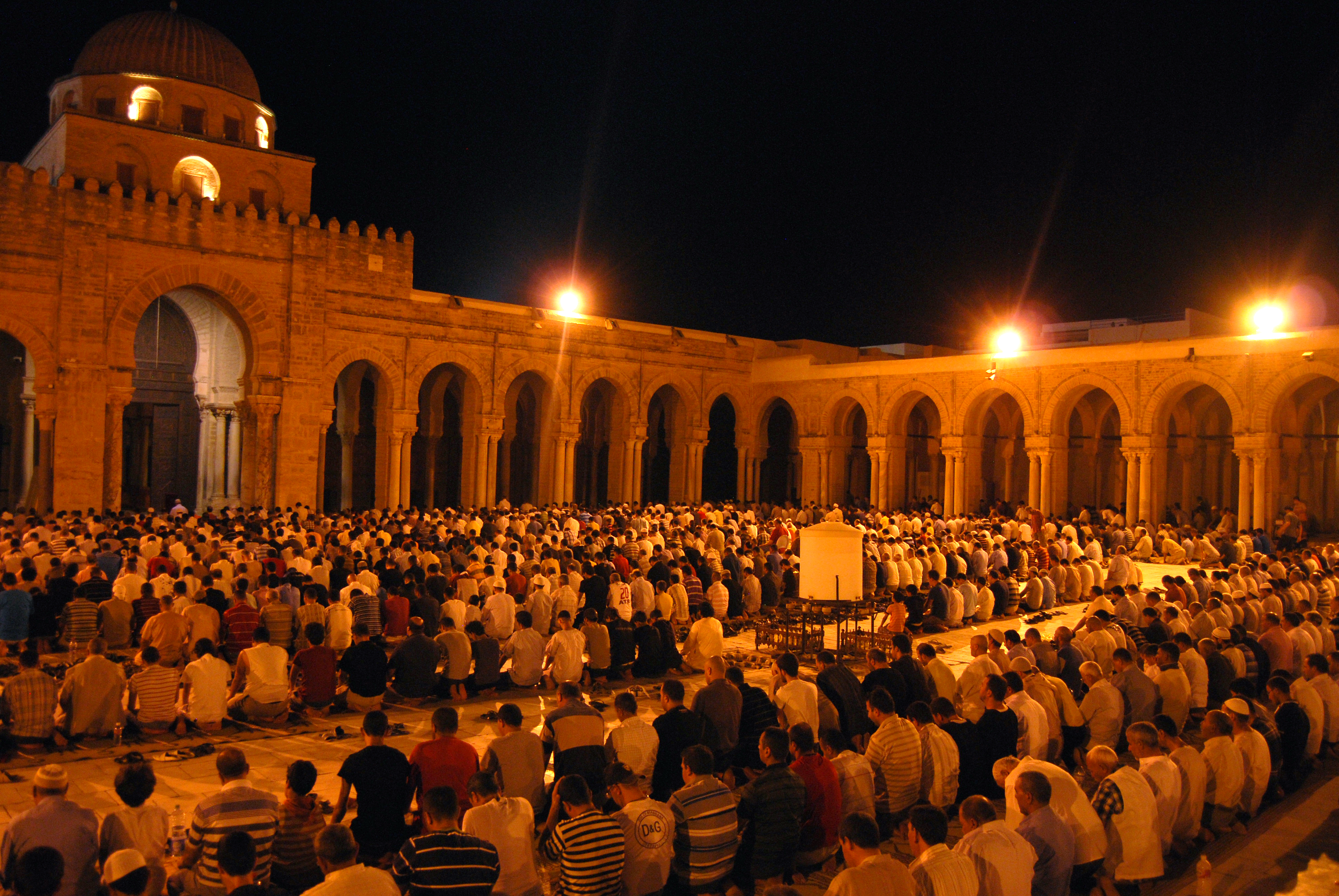
Salat of Tarawih in Great Mosque

== See also ==
- Kairouan's significance in Islam
- List of mosques in Kairouan
