= Battle of Manu =

9th c. military engagement

Date	3 or 4 May 896
Location	Manu, (present-day Libya)
Result	Aghlabid victory

Belligerents
Aghlabids	Nafusa

Commanders and leaders
Ibrahim II	Aflah ibn al-Abbs

Strength
Unknown	20,000

Casualties and losses
Unknown	12,000 including 400 scholars and jurists

The Battle of Manu was a major battle that was fought in early May 896 near the fort of Manu (Ad Ammonem site, modern Mellita 24 km west of Sabratha, Libya) between the forces of the Aghlabid Emir Ibrahim II and the forces of the Nafusa tribe.

== Aftermath ==
After the battle, the Aghlabids attacked Qantrara, a city and a Rustamid locality located in the vicinity of Nefta and later attacked Nafzawa. In August–September 897, Ibrahim's son Abu l-'Abbas returned and attacked the Nafusa. During this campaign, several hundred inhabitants (including 80 scholars) were imprisoned and brought back to Ifriqiya, where they were massacred and gruesomely executed by Ibrahim.

The disaster at Manu marked the end of Rustamid rule over Jebal Nafusa, as the Nafusa deposed their Rustamid governor Aflah ibn al-Abbas and replaced him with his cousin (who himself was later replaced by Aflah). In the years following the defeat at Manu, Abdallah ibn al-hayr became the Hakim of Jebel Nafusa.
