= Muhammad I ibn al-Aghlab =

Emir of Ifriqiya (841–856)

Abu'l-Abbas Muhammad ibn al-Aghlab

Emir of Ifriqiya, Sicily and Malta
- Reign: February 841 – 856
- Predecessor: Abu Iqal al-Aghlab ibn Ibrahim
- Successor: Abu Ibrahim Ahmad ibn Muhammad
- Born: c. 788
- Died: c. 856
Names
- Abu'l-Abbas Muhammad I ibn al-Aghlab
- House: Aghlabid
- Military career
- Service years: c. 845 – 856
- Conflicts: Arab raid of Rome

Abu'l-Abbas Muhammad I ibn al-Aghlab (Arabic: أبو العباس محمد الأول بن الأغلب) (died 856) was the fifth emir of the Aghlabid dynasty, who ruled over Ifriqiya, Malta, and most of Sicily from 841 until his death. He also led the raid of Rome.

Muhammad I was the son of the dynasty's fourth emir, Abu Iqal (838–841). Muhammad I turned out to be a great commander and economic strategist, like his uncle Ziyadat Allah I of Ifriqiya and his rival Asad ibn al-Furat. Under his reign, the Aghlabids continued their expansion into the Mediterranean, conquering Messina, Taranto, large parts of Apulia and supporting Emir Kalfün with the establishment of an Islamic Bari.

Naples allied with his preceding rulers and asked for their support to repel the siege of Lombard troops coming from the Duchy of Benevento, but, despite the previous Muslim-Christian alliance, Abul Abbas sacked Miseno, but only for Khums purposes (Islamic booty), without conquering the territories of Campania.

Notable was his raid on Rome, history's first Muslim invasion of the Caput Mundi and the central administration of the Catholic Church. In 846, Abul Abbas landed at Porto and Ostia with his enormous army. Having surpassed the Tiber, he continued to strike in the Ostiense and Portuense, while the Roman militia swiftly retreated to the safety of the Roman walls. Simultaneously, his other forces landed at the Tyrrhenian Sea port of Civitavecchia. The Vatican Hill was plundered, but Abul Abbas was unsuccessful in storming the protective Aurelian walls of Rome. However, his forces managed to loot huge amount of wealth St. Peter's Basilica and Basilica of Saint Paul Outside the Walls.

In Ifriqiya and Malta, during his rule, agriculture and trade flourished and new urban construction was observed, most notably the Great Mosques of Sousse and Sfax. Muhammad's reign was briefly interrupted by his brother Abu Ja'far Ahmad, who, like his Abbasid contemporary Al-Wathiq, supported the Mu'tazili and persecuted their Sunni opponents, executing some and imprisoning others, most notably the Maliki scholar and jurist Sahnun.

== Death ==
Muhammad I died in Palermo in 856. He was succeeded by his son Ahmad ibn Muhammad (856–863), under whose reign the kingdom of the Aghlabids reached its zenith.

== Sources ==
- Gregorovius, Ferdinand (1988). Storia della città di Roma nel Medioevo (in Italian). Vol. 3. Roma: Gherardo Casini Editore. ISBN 9788840381756.
- Marçais, G. & Schacht, J. (1960). "Ag̲h̲labids or Banu 'l-Ag̲h̲lab". In Gibb, H. A. R.; Kramers, J. H.; Lévi-Provençal, E.; Schacht, J.; Lewis, B. & Pellat, Ch. (eds.). The Encyclopaedia of Islam, Second Edition. Volume I: A–B. Leiden: E. J. Brill. pp. 247–250. doi:10.1163/1573-3912_islam_COM_0024. OCLC 495469456.

Muhammad I ibn al-Aghlab Aghlabid dynasty
| Preceded by Abu Iqal al-Aghlab | Emir of Ifriqiya; 841–856 | Succeeded by Abu Ibrahim Ahmad |
