= Abu Iqal al-Aghlab ibn Ibrahim =

Emir of Ifriqiya (838–841)

Abu Iqal al-Aghlab ibn Ibrahim أبو عقال الأغلب بن إبراهيم

Emir of Ifriqiya and Sicily
- Reign: June 838 – February 841
- Predecessor: Ziyadat Allah ibn Ibrahim
- Successor: Muhammad ibn Abu Iqal al-Aghlab
- Died: February 841
- Children: Muhammad
Names
- Abu'l-Abbas Abdallah ibn Ibrahim ibn al-Aghlab
- House: Aghlabid
- Father: Ibrahim ibn al-Aghlab
- Religion: Sunni Islam

Abu Iqal al-Aghlab ibn Ibrahim (Arabic: أبو عقال الأغلب بن إبراهيم) was the fourth Aghlabid emir of Ifriqiya, ruling from 838 to his death in February 841. He was renowned for his erudition and intelligence, and his capable administration. He was succeeded by his son Muhammad I.

== Sources ==
- Marçais, G. & Schacht, J. (1960). "Ag̲h̲labids or Banu 'l-Ag̲h̲lab". In Gibb, H. A. R.; Kramers, J. H.; Lévi-Provençal, E.; Schacht, J.; Lewis, B. & Pellat, Ch. (eds.). The Encyclopaedia of Islam, Second Edition. Volume I: A–B. Leiden: E. J. Brill. pp. 247–250. doi:10.1163/1573-3912_islam_COM_0024. OCLC 495469456.

Abu Iqal al-Aghlab ibn Ibrahim Aghlabid dynasty
| Preceded by Ziyadat Allah I | Emir of Ifriqiya; 838–841 | Succeeded by Muhammad I |
