= Abu Ibrahim Ahmad ibn Muhammad =

Emir of Ifriqiya (856–863)

Abu Ibrahim Ahmad ibn Muhammad أبو إبراهيم أحمد بن محمد

Emir of Ifriqiya, Sicily and Malta
- Reign: 856 – 28 December 863
- Predecessor: Muhammad ibn al-Aghlab
- Successor: Ziyadat Allah ibn Muhammad
- Died: 28 December 863
- Children: Ibrahim, Muhammad
Names
- Abu Ibrahim Ahmad ibn Muhammad
- Father: Muhammad
- Religion: Islam

Abu Ibrahim Ahmad ibn Muhammad (Arabic: أبو إبراهيم أحمد بن محمد) was the sixth Aghlabid emir of Ifriqiya, ruling from 856 to his death on 28 December 863. He succeeded his uncle, Muhammad I, and was succeeded by his brother, Ziyadat Allah II ibn Muhammad. His reign was peaceful, and mostly remembered for his public works.

== Sources ==
- Marçais, G. & Schacht, J. (1960). "Ag̲h̲labids or Banu 'l-Ag̲h̲lab". In Gibb, H. A. R.; Kramers, J. H.; Lévi-Provençal, E.; Schacht, J.; Lewis, B. & Pellat, Ch. (eds.). The Encyclopaedia of Islam, Second Edition. Volume I: A–B. Leiden: E. J. Brill. pp. 247–250. doi:10.1163/1573-3912_islam_COM_0024. OCLC 495469456.

Abu Ibrahim Ahmad ibn Muhammad Aghlabid dynasty
Preceded by Muhammad I	Emir of Ifriqiya; 856–863	Succeeded by Ziyadat Allah II
