= Aghlabid dynasty =

800–909 Arab dynasty of North Africa and South Italy

Aghlabid dynasty الأغالبة (Arabic) Banū al-Aghlab
- 800–909
- Maximum extent of Aghlabid authority (Note: The occupation of Sardinia by the Aghlabids is debated among historians. See article for details.)
- Status: Vassal of the Abbasid Caliphate
- Capital: Kairouan, with royal court at: al-Abbasiyya (800–876); Raqqada (876–909)
- Common languages: Arabic
- Religion: Sunni Islam (Hanafi, Mu'tazila)
- Government: Hereditary monarchy
- Emir
  - 800–812: Ibrahim ibn al-Aghlab
  - 903–909: Ziyadat Allah III
- History
  - Established: 800
  - Overthrown by the Fatimids: 909
  - Disestablished: 909
- Currency: Aghlabid Dinar
| Preceded by | Succeeded by |
| Abbasid Caliphate | Fatimid Caliphate |

The Aghlabid dynasty (Arabic: الأغالبة) was an Arab dynasty that ruled Ifriqiya (Note: Roughly present-day Tunisia, northeastern Algeria and northwestern Libya.) from 800 to 909, nominally as vassals of the Abbasid Caliphate. During this time, they also conquered Sicily, Malta, parts of southern Italy, and possibly Sardinia. The dynasty originated from the tribe of Banu Tamim and was founded by Ibrahim ibn al-Aghlab, who was appointed by the Abbasid caliph in 800 to rule this province.

The Aghlabids adhered to the Mu'tazilite rationalist doctrine within Hanafi Sunni Islam, which they imposed as the state doctrine of Ifriqiya. They sponsored the construction of mosques and civic infrastructure, major examples of which have survived to the present day as some of the oldest Islamic-era monuments in the region. Their rule ended when they were overthrown by the new power of the Fatimids in 909.

== History ==
=== Independence and consolidation ===
In 800, the Abbasid Caliph Harun al-Rashid appointed Ibrahim I ibn al-Aghlab, son of a Khurasani Arab commander from the Banu Tamim tribe, as hereditary emir of Ifriqiya, in response to the anarchy that had reigned in that province following the fall of the Muhallabids. At that time there were perhaps 100,000 Arabs living in Ifriqiya, although the Berbers still constituted the great majority. Most of the Arab immigrants had come from Syria and Iraq, both of which had consistently contributed a significant number of migrants to the Maghreb region from the start.

Ibrahim was to control an area that encompassed what is now eastern Algeria, Tunisia and Tripolitania. The territory granted to Ibrahim was not demarcated, as it theoretically encompassed the entire Maghreb west of Cyrenaica, including any newly conquered territories. Although independent in all but name, his dynasty never ceased to recognise Abbasid overlordship. The Aghlabids paid an annual tribute of 800,000 dirhams to the Abbasid Caliph and their suzerainty was referenced in the khutba at Friday prayers.

After the pacification of the country, Ibrahim ibn al-Aghlab established a residence at a new capital, al-Abbasiyya, founded outside Kairouan in 800 and built between 801 and 810. This was done partly to distance himself from the opposition of the Malikite jurists and theologians, who condemned what they saw as the luxurious life of the Aghlabids (not to mention the fact that the Aghlabids were Mu'tazilites in theology, and Hanafis in fiqh), and disliked the unequal treatment of the Muslim Berbers. Additionally, border defenses such as ribats were set up, including in coastal cities like Sousse (Susa) and Monastir. The Aghlabids also built up the irrigation of the area and enhanced the public buildings and mosques of Ifriqiya. Slaves were obtained through the trans-Saharan trade, through Mediterranean commerce, and from raids on other lands like Sicily and Italy.

The Aghlabid army was composed of two main elements. The first was the jund, or Arab troops descended from the Arab tribesmen who had participated in the early Muslim conquests of North Africa. The other component of the army was recruited from slaves, put in place partly to counterbalance to the power of the jund. It was recorded that 5,000 black Zanj slaves were stationed in Abbasiya as part of its garrison. Under Ziyadat Allah I (r. 817–838) came a revolt of Arab troops (the jund) in 824, the last but most serious episode of confrontation between them and the Aghlabid emirs. The rebellion was led by a commander named Mansur ibn Nasr al-Tunbudhi, who owned a fortress near Tunis. By September 824 the rebels had occupied Tunis and Kairouan, but the Aghlabids managed to repel them from Kairouan a month later and killed Mansur. Another chief, Amir ibn Nafi', took over leadership of the rebels and inflicted a severe defeat on Ziyadat Allah's forces. Eventually, the emir was able to gain the upper hand with the help of the Ibadite Berbers of the Nafwaza region and finally crushed the rebellion in 827. In 838/839 (224 AH) the southwestern province of Qastiliya (the Djerid region), largely inhabited by Ibadi Muslims, revolted, prompting the Aghlabids to recapture Tozeur, its main city, that year.

=== Conquest of Sicily ===
In 827, soon after Ziyadat Allah defeated the rebellion, the Aghlabid conquest of Sicily began. Asad ibn al-Furat, a qadi from Kairouan, was appointed as commander of the Aghlabid forces. The pretense for this invasion was an internal revolt in Byzantine Sicily led by a military commander named Euphemios who requested support from the Aghlabids.

Despite the political differences and rivalry between the Aghlabids, who served under the Abbasid Caliphate, and the Umayyad Emirate of Córdoba, the Muslims of al-Andalus (in the Iberian Peninsula) also sent a fleet under Asba' ibn Wakil to aid the Aghlabid conquest of Sicily. Ibn Kathir recorded that a joint force of 300 Umayyad and Aghlabid ships were present. The Aghlabid garrison at Mineo managed to get into contact with the Andalusian Umayyads, who immediately agreed to the alliance, provided that Asba' was recognized as the overall commander, and, together with fresh troops from Ifriqiya, they marched on Mineo. Theodotus retreated to Enna and the siege of Mineo was broken in July or August 830. The combined Ifriqiyan and Andalusian army then torched Mineo and laid siege to another town, possibly Calloniana (modern Barrafranca). However, a plague broke out in their camp, causing the death of Asba' and many others. The town fell later, in autumn, but the Arabs' numbers were depleted to the point where they were forced to abandon it and retreat west. Theodotus launched a pursuit and inflicted heavy casualties, and, thereafter, most of the Andalusians departed the island. However, Theodotus too was killed at this time, possibly in one of these skirmishes.

The conquest of Sicily proceeded slowly and at an uneven pace, progressing roughly from west to east through multiple campaigns over many years. Palermo was conquered in 831 and became the capital of Muslim rule on the island and the base for further conquests. Messina was besieged and captured in 842 or 843, possibly with the support of some Neapolitans, and became a base for further campaigns into the Italian mainland. Syracuse was captured in 878. The conquest of the island was not fully completed until 902, when Taormina was conquered. Even after this, however, some patches of local Byzantine/Christian resistance continued until 967, long after the Aghlabid dynasty had ended.

=== Italian Peninsula ===
Even as the conquest of Sicily was ongoing, the Aghlabids began campaigning on the Italian mainland. Their invasions of Calabria and Apulia, as well as their attacks on other central Mediterranean islands, were probably undertaken as an extension of their conquest of Sicily, aiming to aid the latter by attacking other Byzantine positions in the region. The first major expeditions to the peninsula took place between 835 and 843. Amantea was taken in 839 or 846 and occupied until 886, when the Byzantines retook it. Taranto was captured in 840 and occupied until 880. Bari was captured by Muslims either in 840 or 847. Rome was raided by a Muslim force in 846, although it is not certain that the raiders came from Aghlabid territory. Another attack towards Rome took place in 849, leading to a great naval battle near Ostia during which a fleet of Muslim ships was destroyed, marking a halt to Muslim advances on the peninsula.

Many of the Muslim forces that operated on the peninsula or occupied some of its cities seem to have had only tenuous allegiances to the Aghlabid dynasty. Some Muslim mercenaries even entered into the service of Naples or local Lombard rulers at various times. The early Muslim occupiers of Bari, for example, appear to have served as mercenaries of Radelchis I of Benevento. The Emirate of Bari, which existed from 847 to 871, had its own rulers whose relations to the Aghlabids are not clearly known.

=== Malta, Sardinia, and Corsica ===
Elsewhere in the central Mediterranean, the Aghlabids conquered the island of Malta in 870. They also attacked or raided Sardinia and Corsica. Some modern references state that Sardinia came under Aghlabid control around 810 or after the beginning of the conquest of Sicily in 827. The historian Corrado Zedda argues that the island hosted a Muslim presence during the Aghlabid period, possibly a limited foothold along the coasts that forcibly coexisted with the local Byzantine government. In contrast, the historian Alex Metcalfe argues that the available evidence for any Muslim occupation or colonisation of the island during this period is limited and inconclusive, and that Muslim attacks were limited to raids. According to Fabio Pinna, most Sardinian historians and archaeologists studying this period of the island's history have reached the same conclusion, denying that a Muslim conquest and occupation of Sardinia took place, due to insufficient supporting evidence from archaeology and local historical records.

=== Apogee in Ifriqiya ===
The expansion campaign into Sicily, which Ziyadat Allah launched right after defeating the jund rebellion that started in 824, gave the restless Arab troops of Ifriqiya a new outlet for their military energies. It also brought in new revenues to the Aghlabid state. At home, the Aghlabid emirs faced significant criticism from Maliki religious scholars, who held great influence as religious elites in the region. They dealt with this problem by drawing the Maliki scholars into the orbit of the state and granting them appointments to high religious offices. They also countered criticism of their wealth and privilege by publicly dispensing charity to the poor and sponsoring the construction and expansion of mosques. All of these factors led to greater internal stability and peace in Ifriqiya after 827. Agriculture and trans-Saharan trade were further developed under Aghlabid rule, leading to economic expansion and a growing urban population.

The Aghlabid emirs sponsored building projects, notably the rebuilding of the Great Mosque of Kairouan, and the kingdom developed an architectural style which combined Abbasid and Byzantine architecture. In 876, Ibrahim II ibn Ahmad moved his residence from al-Abbasiya to a new palace-city that he founded, called Raqqada. The new city contained a mosque, baths, a market, and several palaces. For the rest of his life, Ibrahim II resided in a palace called Qasr al-Fath (Arabic: قصر الفتح, lit. 'Palace of Victory'), which also remained the residence of his successors (except for some periods when they moved to Tunis).

=== Decline and fall ===
The decline of the dynasty began under Ibrahim II (875–902). An attack by the Tulunids of Egypt had to be repelled and a revolt of the Berbers put down with much loss of life. In 893 there began amongst the Kutama Berbers the movement of the Isma'ili Fatimids, led by Abu Abdallah al-Shi'i, the dā'ī of the future caliph Abdallah al-Mahdi, although it took almost a decade before they were able to seriously threaten Aghlabid power.

In 902 Ibrahim II became the only Aghlabid emir to personally lead a military campaign in Sicily and the Italian mainland. While he was away in Sicily, Abu Abdallah struck the first significant blow against Aghlabid authority in North Africa by attacking and capturing the city of Mila (present-day eastern Algeria). This news triggered a serious response from the Aghlabids, who sent a punitive expedition of 12,000 men from Tunis in October of the same year. Abu Abdallah's forces were forced to flee their base at Tazrut and re-establish themselves at Ikjan.

Ibrahim II died in October 902 while besieging Cosenza in Italy and was succeeded by Abdallah II. On 27 July 903 Abdallah was assassinated and his son Ziyadat Allah III took power, basing himself in Tunis. These internal Aghlabid troubles gave Abu Abdallah the opportunity to recapture Mila and then go on to capture Setif by October or November 904. Further Aghlabid attempts to crush his movement had little success. In 907, in response to the growing threat, Ziyadat Allah III moved his court back to Raqqada, which he fortified. Later in 907 the heavily fortified city of Baghaya, on the southern Roman road between Ifriqiya and the central Maghreb, fell to the Kutama. This opened a hole in the wider defensive system of Ifriqiya and created panic in Raqqada. Ziyadat Allah III stepped up anti-Fatimid propaganda, recruited volunteers, and took measures to defend the weakly-fortified city of Kairouan. In 908 he personally led his army in an indecisive battle against the Kutama army near Dar Madyan (probably a site between Sbeitla and Kasserine), with neither side gaining the upper hand. During the winter of 908-909 Abu Abdallah conquered the region around Chott el-Jerid. An Aghlabid counterattack against Baghaya failed.

On 25 February 909, Abu Abdallah set out from Ikjan with an army of 200,000 men for a final invasion of Kairouan. The remaining Aghlabid army, led by an Aghlabid prince named Ibrahim Ibn Abi al-Aghlab, met them near al-Aribus on 18 March. The battle lasted until the afternoon, when a contingent of Kutama horsemen outflanked the Aghlabid army and finally caused a rout. When news of the defeat reached Raqqada, Ziyadat Allah III packed his valuable treasures and fled towards Egypt. The population of Kairouan looted the abandoned palaces of Raqqada. When Ibn Abi al-Aghlab arrived on the scene after his defeat, he called on the population to mount a last-ditch resistance, but they refused. On 25 March 909 (Saturday, 1 Rajab 296), Abu Abdallah entered Raqqada and took up residence here. That same year his forces retrieved the Fatimid caliph, Abdallah al-Mahdi, from Sijilmasa (in the western Maghreb) and brought him to Ifriqiya, thus establishing the Fatimid Caliphate.

== Religion ==
The Aghlabids adhered to the Mu'tazilite theological movement within Hanafi Sunni Islam. The Aghlabids adopted the Mu'tazilite rationalist doctrine after it became the official doctrine of the Abbasid Caliphate of Baghdad during the reign of caliph al-Ma'mun (813–833). The officialization of this doctrine faced strong opposition from the Maliki majority of Ifriqiya, particularly due to the Mu'tazilite rejection of the orthodox belief that the Qur'an was God's eternal word and therefore uncreated. Although the Aghlabids recognized the political influence of the Maliki religious leaders, they were both unable and unwilling to alter their governmental system to align with their beliefs. The qāḍī (judge) of Kairouan adhered to the Hanafi school and endorsed the concept of Khalq al-Qur'an (createdness of the Qur'an). The Aghlabids consistently favored Iraqis as their higher-ranking judges, while the viziers had affiliations with the Maliki school.

Nonetheless, the Aghlabids were able to bolster their religious standing and counter criticisms directed against them. Some Malikis were persecuted for rejecting Mu'tazilite beliefs, such as Sahsun, who suffered persecution during the reign of Muhammad I ibn al-Aghlab (841–856) for rejecting the Mu'tazilite concept that the Qur'an was created. The Aghlabids also displayed great generosity in their spending on religious buildings, such al-Zaytuna Mosque, which they had reconstructed by 864.

As Sunni Muslims, the Aghlabids were vassals of the Abbasid caliphs of Baghdad, representing the influence and presence of the Abbasids throughout Ifriqiya. The Aghlabids maintained strained relations with the Rustamid dynasty of Tahert, who adhered to the Kharijite Ibadi sect. Their relations with the Idrisid dynasty of Fez were always tense, as the Idrisids were Zaydi Shi'ites who had expansionist ambitions on the relatively weak Rustamid state. Furthermore, the Aghlabids held a hostile stance towards the Umayyads in the Emirate of Cordoba.

== Architecture ==
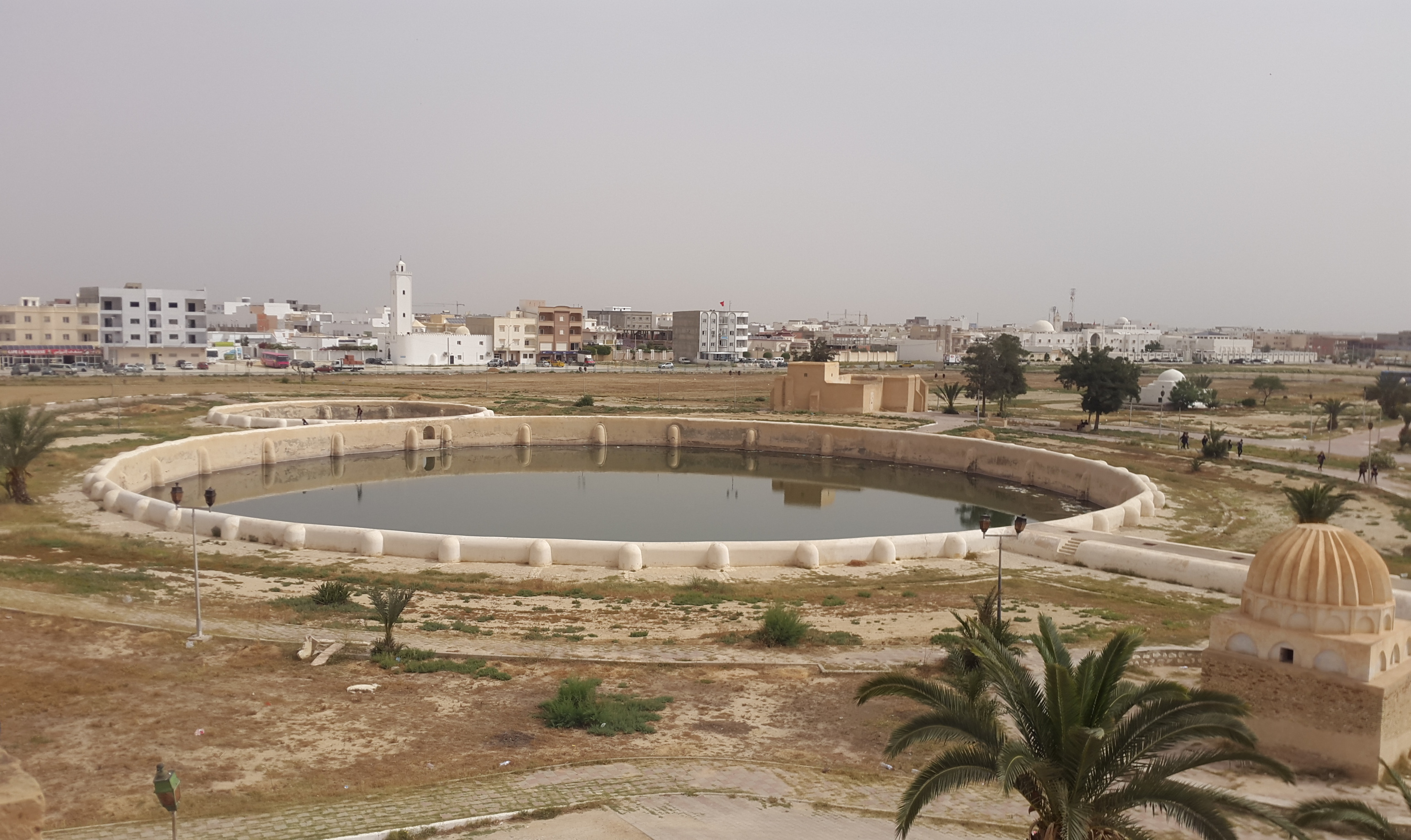
One of the Aghlabid reservoirs in Kairouan

The Aghlabids were major builders and erected many of the oldest Islamic-era monuments in present-day Tunisia, including military structures like the Ribat of Sousse and the Ribat of Monastir, religious buildings like the Great Mosque of Sousse and the Great Mosque of Sfax, and practical infrastructure works like the Aghlabid Reservoirs of Kairouan. Much of their architecture, even their mosques, had a heavy and almost fortress-like appearance, but they nonetheless left an influential artistic legacy.

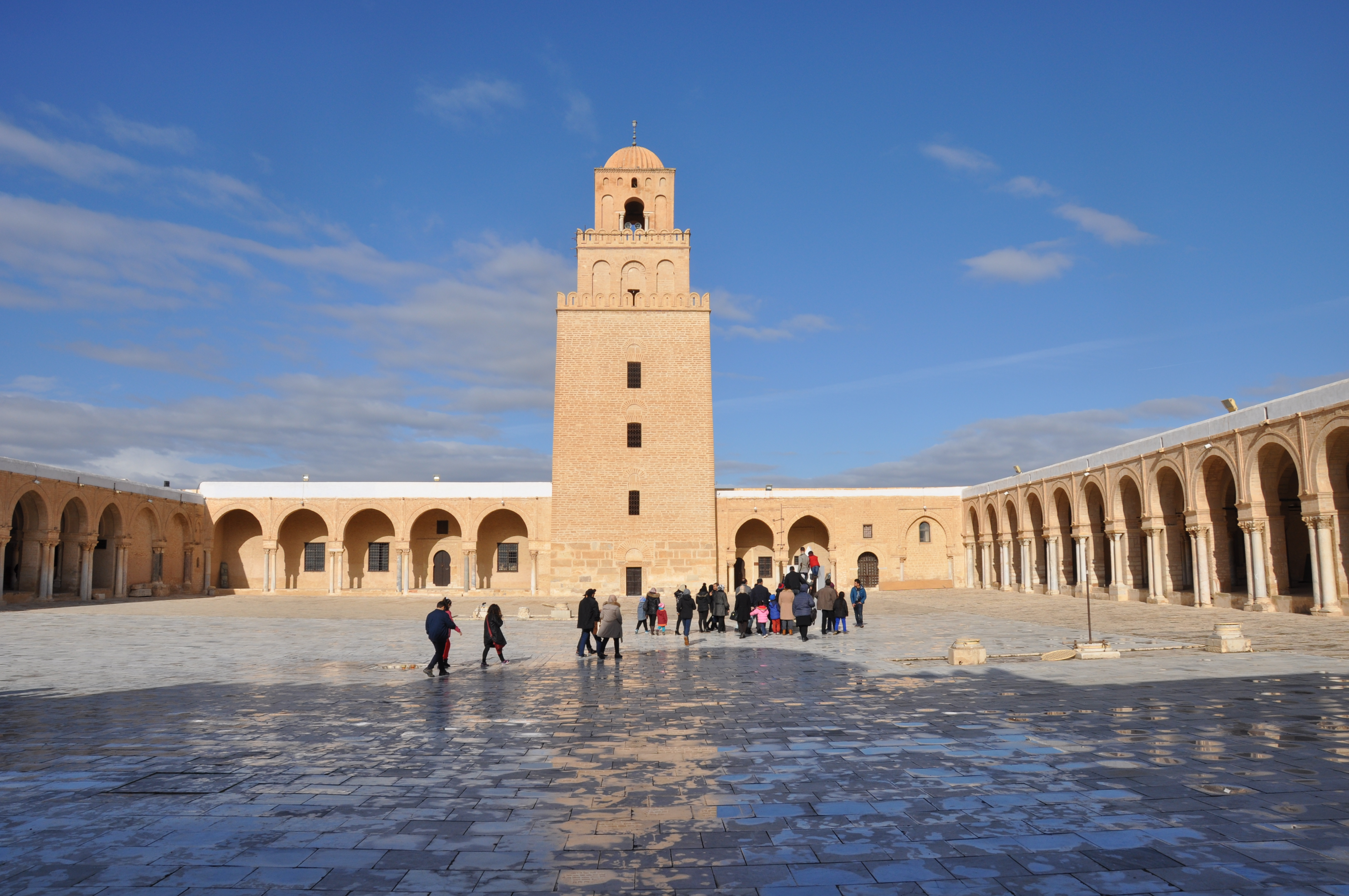
The Great Mosque of Kairouan, rebuilt by Ziyadat Allah I in 836

One of the most important Aghlabid monuments is the Great Mosque of Kairouan, which was completely rebuilt by the emir Ziyadat Allah I in 836, although various additions and repairs were effected later which complicate the chronology of its construction. The mosque features an enormous rectangular courtyard, a large hypostyle prayer hall, and a thick three-story minaret (tower from which the call to prayer was issued). The minaret is the oldest surviving one in North Africa and its shape may have been modeled on existing Roman lighthouses. The mihrab (niche symbolizing the direction of prayer) of the prayer hall is among the oldest examples of its kind, richly decorated with marble panels carved in high-relief vegetal motifs and with ceramic tiles with overglaze and luster. Next to the mihrab is the oldest surviving minbar (pulpit) in the world, made of richly-carved teakwood panels. Both the carved panels of the minbar and the ceramic tiles of the mihrab are believed to be imports from Abbasid Iraq. An elegant dome in front of the mihrab wall is an architectural highlight of this period. Its light construction contrasts with the bulky structure of the surrounding mosque and the dome's drum is elaborately decorated with a frieze of blind arches, squinches carved in the shape of shells, and carved low-relief motifs.

The Mosque of Ibn Khayrun (also known as the "Mosque of the Three Doors") possesses an external façade featuring carved Kufic inscriptions and vegetal motifs, which some scholars have called the oldest decorated external façade in Islamic architecture and which may contain the oldest foundation inscription crediting a private individual (rather than a ruler) for a mosque's construction. The al-Zaytuna Mosque in Tunis, which was founded earlier around 698, also owes its overall current form to the Aghlabid emir Abu Ibrahim Ahmad (r. 856–863).

== Aghlabid rulers ==
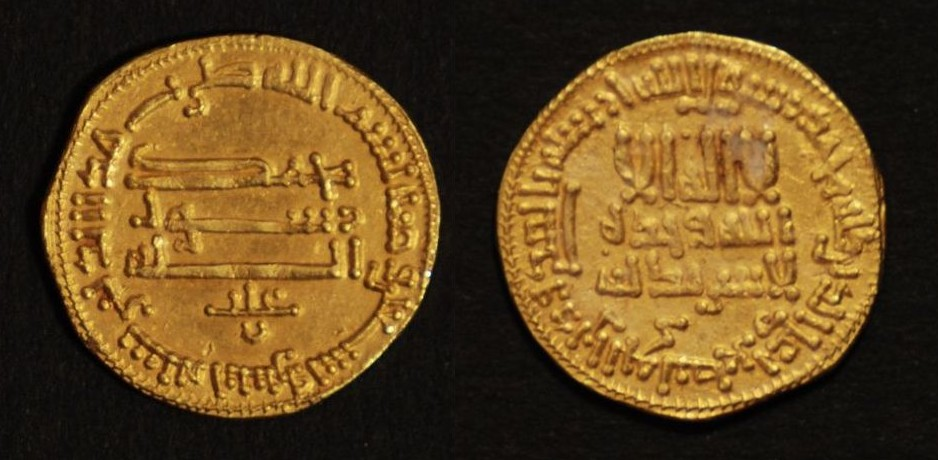
Gold dinar of Ibrahim I ibn al-Aghlab (184–196 AH), anonymous (but dynastic motto 'Ghalab' on the reverse), no mint name (probably Kairouan, Ifriqiya). Struck in 192 AH (807/808 AD). Preserved at the Musée national d'art islamique de Raqqada.

1. Ibrahim I, son of Al-Aghlab ibn Salim, 800–812
2. Abdallah I, son of Ibrahim I, 812–817
3. Ziyadat Allah I, son of Ibrahim I, 817–838
4. Al-Aghlab, son of Ibrahim I, 838–841
5. Muhammad I, son of Al-Aghlab, 841–856
6. Ahmad I, son of Muhammad I, 856–863
7. Ziyadat Allah II, son of Muhammad I, 863–864
8. Muhammad II, son of Ahmad I, 864–875
9. Ibrahim II, son of Ahmad I, 875–902
10. Abdallah II, son of Ibrahim II, 902–903
11. Ziyadat Allah III, son of Abdullah II, 903–909

== Family tree ==
Family tree of the Aghlabid dynasty

Salim
Al-Aghlab
Ibrahim I r. 800–812
Abd Allah I r. 812–817 | Ziyadat Allah I r. 817–838 | Al-Aghlab r. 838–841
Muhammad I r. 841–856
Ahmad r. 856–863 | Ziyadat Allah II r. 863–864
Muhammad II r. 864–875 | Ibrahim II r. 875–902
Abd Allah II r. 902–903
Ziyadat Allah III r. 903–909

== See also ==
- Battle of Manu
- History of medieval Tunisia
- History of Islam in southern Italy
- List of Sunni dynasties
- History of Algeria
- History of Libya
- Early Caliphate navy
