= Ziyadat Allah I of Ifriqiya =

Emir of Ifriqiya (817–838)

Ziyadat Allah I زيادة الله
- Amir
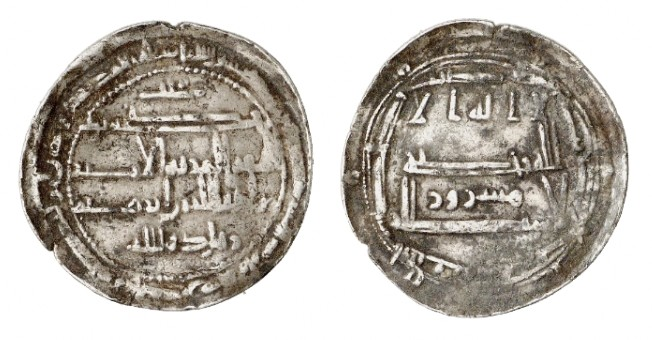
- Silver Dirham of Ziyadat Allah in 824 AD

Emir of Ifriqiya
- Reign: 25 June 817 – 10 June 838
- Predecessor: Abdallah ibn Ibrahim
- Successor: Abu Iqal al-Aghlab ibn Ibrahim

Emir of Sicily
- Reign: September 831 – 10 June 838
- Predecessor: Photeinos (as Strategos of Sicily)
- Successor: Abu Iqal al-Aghlab ibn Ibrahim
- Born: c. 788
- Died: 10 June 838
Names
- Abu Muhammad Ziyadat Allah ibn Ibrahim ibn al-Aghlab
- House: Aghlabid
- Father: Ibrahim ibn al-Aghlab
- Military career
- Service years: 820s – 838
- Conflicts: Arab–Byzantine wars, Arab Conquest of Sicily

Abu Muhammad Ziyadat Allah I ibn Ibrahim ibn al-Aghlab (Arabic: زيادة الله الأول) (d. 10 June 838) was the Aghlabid ruler (amir) of Ifriqiya from 817 until his death in 838. His reign marked a shift towards greater control and stability for the emirs in Ifriqiya.

== Reign ==
Despite being an independent ruler of Ifriqiya, Ziyadat Allah was faced with many of the same issues that his predecessors encountered as governors under the Abbasid Caliphate. While Ziyadat Allah had to deal with what was possibly the largest jund revolt in Ifriqiya, it was the last to ever occur. The revolt broke out in 824 and saw most of Ifriqiya conquered by the jund. Usually emirs had to deal with the jund and Berber problem simultaneously, each group exacerbating the issue of the other. However, it seems that Ziyadat Allah had established a working relationship with the Berbers. With this relationship he employed the Berbers to defeat the rebelling jund. This alliance allowed him to avoid ruin and strengthen his control. To some extent this resembles the relationship that Idrīs b. ʿAbdallāh b. Ḥasan had with the Berbers which allowed the Idrisid state to become a powerful player in the region that sometimes-threatened Aghlabid territory. In the context of North Africa an alliance with the local Berbers lessened an emir's reliance on a strong occupying force like the jund while strengthening the state. With Ziyadat, a positive relationship with the Berbers allowed him not only to avoid losing control but to quash the rebellion and turn Aghlabid energies towards conquest. Some have argued that Ziyadat Allah opened the conquest in Sicily to attract the jihad members of the jund. Another version has Ziyadat already in control of the rebellion and opening the conquest to prevent further revolts and acquire resources to further stabilize his rule. However, this assertion is criticized for its reliance on a source that was written far after the events occurred. The conquest marked a new era for the Aghlabids which is why Ziyadat is sometimes described as the second founder of the Aghlabid regime. His solving of the jund and Berber issue that had faced all emirs preceding him set the region on a new path of a more stable ruling family. The conquest saw Sicily under Aghlabid rule until the Fatimids overthrew the Aghlabids in the early 9th century.

== Context ==
Ifriqiya under the Abbasids was known to be a difficult region to rule. Nasr b. Habiib, the advisor to the emir at the time, wrote of his concerns with governing the region to the caliph saying "...Ifriqiya is a large frontier zone which would not be safe without a strong ruler." There were many reasons for this. Two of the most pressing were the jund and the Berbers.

At the start of Ziyadat Allah's rule in 817, the Abbasid Caliphate was still in a state of strife and uncertainty with no caliph in Baghdad. This caused many of the outer provinces, like Ifriqiya, to their own devices. The Aghlabids, now on their own, had to maintain control of the region as independent rulers. The biggest threat posed was the maintenance of the jund, a military force in Ifriqiya that likely numbered over 100,000. The jund had engaged in multiple insurrections since 765 and were a constant threat to governors of Ifriqiya. When Ifriqiya was under control of the Abbasid Caliphate other provinces like Egypt would sometimes provide support. This helped to decrease the frequency that the jund went unpaid which was likely the cause of their rebellions. However, with the Aghlabid governor Ziyadat Allah now independent of the caliphate and independent of the financial support of the empire.

This jund were not the only cause for concern in Ifriqiya. The indigenous Berber tribes had been another source of rebellion and undermined Abbasid authority in the region. During the Abbasid reconquest of Ifriqiya in 763 many of the towns recaptured had to be wrestled from the control of Ibadi militants, a sect now largely subscribed to by the Berbers. The Berbers were such a threat to the control of emirs in the region that by 770 the emir of Ifriqiya recognized the authority of the Berber-Ibadis over the hinterlands of Ifriqiya. In other regions of North Africa, like Northern Morocco which was ruled by the Idrisids starting in 789 through the time of Ziyadat Allah, the rulers were able to maintain control more consistently and effectively due to strong relationships with the local Berber populations. It would seem that the lack of this relationship in Ifriqiya may have resulted from the Abbasid's enslavement of Berbers which continued to some extent even under the Aghlabids. Another cause is the nature of the Berbers when compared to other conquered groups. They were largely armed and accustomed to warfare and therefore more inclined to wage it. Regardless of the cause, it undermined the ability of emirs to maintain a positive relationship with the group.

Ziyadat Allah inherited these issues upon the passing of his brother 'Abd Allah in 817. Unlike his predecessors he was able to rely on an improved relationship with the Berbers and external exploits to solve the issue of the jund once and for all leading to a more stable rule.

== Historiography ==
One of the major issues confronting modern study of the Aghlabids and Ziyadat Allah is the sources from which the knowledge originates. One of the chief sources utilized in studying the Aghlabids is the works of the Islamic historian al-Tabari. Al-Tabari is primarily concerned with the Abbasid empire and its development. This is due to his close connections with the caliph al-Mu’tazz in Baghdad as a close friend of his and as tutor of his son. The geographical bias stemming from this has infiltrated modern scholarship as scholars will assume the geographical bias of the original source. Scholars adopting views more similar to al-Tabari tend to emphasize the role of the civil war that began in 809 in giving the Aghlabids autonomy. Other scholars acknowledge the existence of a degree of agency on the part of the Aghlabids in becoming autonomous. Scholars adopting the latter approach may be less likely to credit or note the achievements of individuals like Ziyadat Allah or to record them at all which is part of the reason the sourcing for Ziyadat Alllah is so sparse.

Primary sources such as al-Tabari or al-Baladhuri can also raise questions due to not being written by individuals personally familiar with much of what they write about. Al-Baladhuri, for example, wrote about the Aghlabids over a hundred years after their demise. Another reliability question is raised due to the long chains of oral sources Islamic historians cite. Because the intermediary sources are not always verifiable, the degree to which the information that has been given can be trusted is difficult to determine. One such example is an anecdote stemming from al-Bakri over two-hundred years after Ziyadat's death. It claims Ziyadat Allah sent 1,0000 gold dinars minted by the Idrisids to the caliph al-Ma’mun for the purpose of expressing the threat they posed to the caliphate. Scholars doubt this claim and it shows the tendency of later sources to overemphasize the caliph's presence in Ifriqiya. However, the jund rebellion faced by Ziyidat Allah and his response to it shows the lack of an external presence in the region.

Another pervasive issue in studying Islamic history, which Ifriqiya is a part of, is the lack of a common framework specific to the field. Much of the framework used to conceptualize Islamic history comes from European contexts especially when studying regional elites such as Ziyadat. This is an issue because elites of European origin did not necessarily function in the same way those of Islamic origin did. As a result, applying a European framework to Islamic elites can lead to misinterpretation of the reciprocal nature of caliph and emir relationships. While Ziyadat was ostensibly the ruler of an autonomous state, the dynamics at play in Abbasid politics help to contextualize his rule.

== Portrayal ==
Ziyadat Allah, a character played by Kal Naga, in the 5th season of the historical fantasy television series Vikings is loosely based on Ziyadat Allah I.

== Sources ==
- Bennison, Amira K. (2009). The Great Caliphs: The Golden Age of the 'Abbasid Empire. Yale University Press.
- Fenwick, Corisande (September 2022). "How to Found an Islamic State: The Idrisids as Rivals to the Abbasid Caliphate in the Far Islamic West". Islamic History and Civilization. 198.
- Finkel, Joshua; Murgotten, Francis Clark (January 1933). "Al-Baladhuri's Account of the Mohammedan Conquests". The Jewish Quarterly Review. 23 (3): 276–277. doi:10.2307/1451600.
- Hagemann, Hannah-Lena; Mewes, Katharina; Verkinderen, Peter (2020). "Studying Elites in Early Islamic History: Concepts and Terminology". In Stefan Heidemann; Gottfried Hagen; Andreas Kaplony; et al. (eds.). Transregional; and Regional Elites – Connecting the Early Islamic Empire. Boston: De Gruyter.
- Heideman, Stefan (2020). "Introduction". In Stefan Heidemann; Gottfried Hagen; Andreas Kaplony; et al. (eds.). Transregional; and Regional Elites – Connecting the Early Islamic Empire. Boston: De Gruyter.
- Hitti, Philip Khuri (1916). "Introduction: Arabic Historiography with Special Reference to Al-Baladhuri". In The Faculty of Political Science of Columbia University (ed.). The Origins of the Islamic State. New York: Columbia University.
- Kennedy, Hugh (2005). "The War between the Brothers". When Baghdad Ruled the Muslim World. Da Capo Press.
- Kennedy, Hugh (2017). "The Origins of the Aghlabids". In Glaire D. Anderson; Corisande Fenwick; Mariam Rosser-Owen (eds.). The Aghlabids and their Neighbors. Brill.
- Savage, E. (1992). "Berbers and Blacks: Ibāḍī Slave Traffic in Eighth-Century North Africa". The Journal of African History. 33 (3).
- The Editors of Encyclopedia Britannica (September 2023). "Fatimid Dynasty". Encyclopedia Britannica. Encyclopedia Britannica.
- Wansbrough, John (1969). "On Recomposing the Islamic History of North Africa: A Review Article". The Journal of the Royal Asiatic Society of Great Britain and Ireland (2): 161–170. JSTOR 25203138.

Ziyadat Allah I of Ifriqiya Aghlabid dynasty
Preceded by Ibrahim I	Emir of Ifriqiya; 817–838	Succeeded by Abu Iqal
