= Battle of Syracuse (859) =

- Part of the Muslim conquest of Sicily
Date	Autumn 859
Location	Syracuse, Sicily
Result	Aghlabid victory

Belligerents
Aghlabid dynasty	Byzantine Empire

Commanders and leaders
Al-Abbas ibn al-Fadl	Constantine Kontomytes

Strength
Unknown	300 ships

Casualties and losses
3 killed (Per Ibn al-Athir)	100 ships captured

The Battle of Syracuse was a military engagement between the Aghlabids and the Byzantines near Syracuse. The Byzantines launched an expedition to re-establish their control over Sicily. The expedition ended in disaster for the Byzantines.

== Background ==
After the fall of Castrgiovanni to the Aghlabids in 859. News spread to the Christian inhabitants of the island, whether in Muslim control or not. At first, such news struck them with great fear, since for thirty years they had looked to the fortress of Castrogiovanni as a pledge of liberation from the Muslim rule. But the Sicilians were moved to urge Emperor Michael III to make a military effort. The Byzantines prepared an expedition to retake the island. The emperor recruited troops from the theme of Cappadocia. With a large fleet numbering 300 ships. The emperor placed the patriarch, Constantine Kontomytes, as the leader of the expedition. Although Byzantine chronicles do not mention this event.

== Battle ==
The Byzantine navy arrived at Syracuse in the autumn of the same year, 859; the Byzantines landed and soon moved, accompanied by the fleet, toward the northern coast. The Aghlabid governor of Sicily, Al-Abbas ibn al-Fadl ibn Ya'qub al-Fazari, according to the historian Ibn al-Athîr, learned of their approach and left Palermo to meet the enemy. There he intercepted them and managed to rout them utterly. The Byzantines fled back to their ships all while being slaughtered from behind by the Arabs. In the ensuing disaster, the Arabs captured 100 ships of the enemy while losing 3 men killed by arrows, according to Ibn al-Athîr.

== Aftermath ==
Despite the defeat of the Byzantines, their arrival encouraged many Sicilian cities to revolt against the Arabs, such as Paternò, Caltabellotta, Caltavuturo, and also Sutera. The Arabs under Al-Abbas managed to subdue them. Informed of the approach of the Byzantine army, perhaps the remnants of the Cappadocians, swelled by the militia of the island, he marched against them and defeated them at Cefalù. The battle marked the end of the Amorian dynasty's attempt to recapture the island. The Arabs had consolidated their rule over Castrogiovanni and the island. Syracuse remained under Byzantine control, though its capture would mark the complete conquest of the island.

== Sources ==
- Amari, Michele (1854). Storia dei Musulmani di Sicilia, Vol I. (in Italian).
- Vasiliev, Alexander A. (1935). Byzantium and the Arabs. Volume I, The Amorium dynasty (820–867) (in French).
- J. B. Bury (2023), The History of the Byzantine Empire, From the Fall of Irene to the Accession of Basil I.
