= Battle of Reggio (901) =

- Part of the Muslim conquest of Sicily; Arab–Byzantine wars
- Map of the Arab–Byzantine naval conflict in the Mediterranean, 7th–11th centuries
Date	10 June 901
Location	Reggio Calabria
Result	Aghlabid victory

Belligerents
Aghlabid dynasty	Byzantine Empire

Commanders and leaders
Abu 'l-Abbas Abdallah	Unknown

The Battle of Reggio was a military engagement between the Aghlabids and the Byzantines at the city of Reggio Calabria. The Aghlabids defeated the Byzantines and sacked Reggio, ending a Byzantine counterattack against Sicily.

== Background ==
During the early years of the 10th century, Sicily faced unrest during the Aghlabids. In 898, serious fighting broke out between the Arab and Berber factions in the Muslim Sicilian army. The Aghlabid ruler of Ifriqiya, Ibrahim II, gave the task to reunite Sicily to his son Abu 'l-Abbas Abdallah in August 900. The reasons for the conflict between the factions are unknown. The Berbers were based in Agrigento while the Arabs were in Palermo. Both parties send delegations to the Aghlabids for fealty. When negotiations failed, the Palermitans launched a failed attack. The Aghlabids besieged Palermo and took it on August 18, 900.

The civil unrest in Sicily brought the attention of the Byzantines since many Sicilian families escaped to Byzantine territory. The Byzantines were determined to take advantage of these favorable circumstances. And indeed, a patrician was sent with an army to Taormina; large numbers of troops were concentrated at Reggio, and a fleet arrived from Constantinople headed towards Messina. The Aghlabids resumed their war against the Christians. In the same year, they marched against Taormina and Catania. Both attacks failed to bring any results.

== Battle ==
In the next year, 901, the Aghlabids under Abu'l-Abbas marched towards Val Demone. At the same time, he received news of the extensive military preparations the Byzantines were making at Reggio, where large numbers of troops were assembled. He then lifted the attack on Demona and marched towards Messina, from where he quickly departed for Reggio with warships. There he arrived and found the army, which consisted of several Byzantine garrisons in southern Italy and Calabrians. There the Aghlabids entered into a fierce battle and defeated them. The Byzantine army panicked and the survirors retreated across the countryside. Afterwards, the Arabs assaulted Reggio unopposed on June 10th and began sacking the city, killing those who resisted, capturing large quantities of loot, including gold, silver, and goods. A large number of prisoners, numbering 15,000, were captured, including the city's archbishop. The victors loaded their ships with it.

== Aftermath ==
Several neighboring cities sent gifts to Abu'l-Abbas, demonstrating their submission, requesting peace, and offering him a large sum of money as tribute. Initially, the Aghlabids wanted to settle in Reggio, but hearing of the Byzantine naval force in Messina, he sailed back. The Aghlabids defeated them and captured 30 of their ships.

== Sources ==
- Alex Metcalfe (2009), The Muslims of Medieval Italy.
- Alexander Vasiliev (1968), Byzantium and the Arabs, Vol. 2: Political relations between Byzantines and Arabs during the Macedonian Dynasty (In French).
- Michele Amari (1854). Storia dei Musulmani di Sicilia, Vol II. (in Italian).
- Giovanni Fiore (1999), Della Calabria illustrata, Volume III.
