= 902 =

Calendar year

902 in various calendars
Gregorian calendar	902; CMII
Ab urbe condita	1655
Armenian calendar	351; ԹՎ ՅԾԱ
Assyrian calendar	5652
Balinese saka calendar	823–824
Bengali calendar	308–309
Berber calendar	1852
Buddhist calendar	1446
Burmese calendar	264
Byzantine calendar	6410–6411
Chinese calendar	辛酉年 (Metal Rooster); 3599 or 3392 — to — 壬戌年 (Water Dog); 3600 or 3393
Coptic calendar	618–619
Discordian calendar	2068
Ethiopian calendar	894–895
Hebrew calendar	4662–4663
- Hindu calendars
Vikram Samvat	958–959
Shaka Samvat	823–824
Kali Yuga	4002–4003
Holocene calendar	10902
Iranian calendar	280–281
Islamic calendar	289–290
Japanese calendar	Engi 2 (延喜２年)
Javanese calendar	800–801
Julian calendar	902; CMII
Korean calendar	3235
Minguo calendar	1010 before ROC 民前1010年
Nanakshahi calendar	−566
Seleucid era	1213/1214 AG
Thai solar calendar	1444–1445
Tibetan calendar	ལྕགས་མོ་བྱ་ལོ་ (female Iron-Bird); 1028 or 647 or −125 — to — ཆུ་ཕོ་ཁྱི་ལོ་ (male Water-Dog); 1029 or 648 or −124

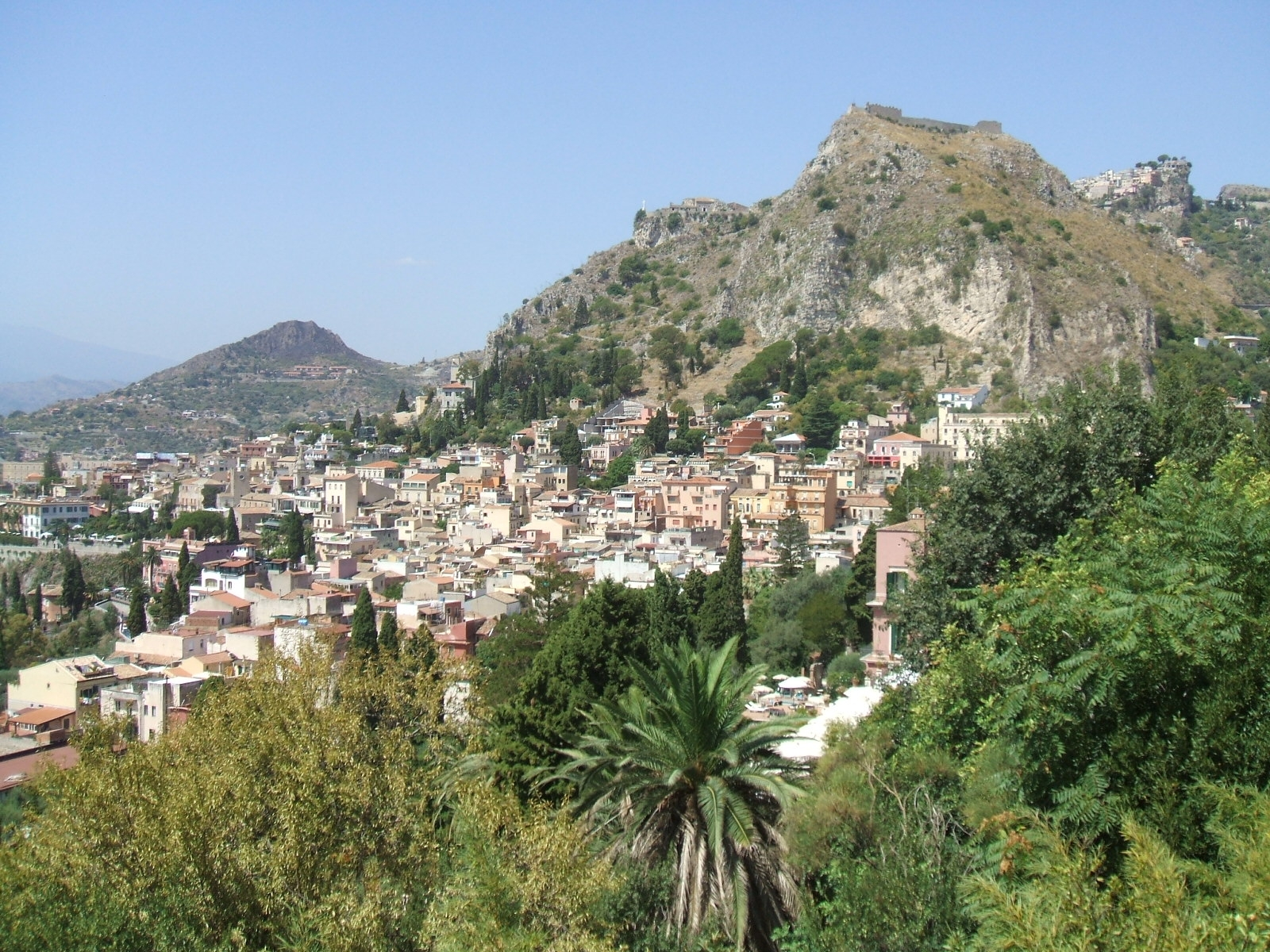
View of Taormina with the Saracen castle.

Year 902 (CMII) was a common year starting on Friday of the Julian calendar.

== Events ==
=== By place ===
==== Europe ====
- Spring – Adalbert II, margrave of Tuscany, revolts against Emperor Louis III ("the Blind"). He helps the deposed King Berengar I to recover the Kingdom of Italy. Louis III is forced to abdicate the Lombard throne and flees to Provence, compelled to promise never to return to Italy.
- February – March – Abu Abbas Abdallah, conqueror of Reggio Calabria, returns from Sicily and succeeds his father Ibrahim II as Aghlabid emir of Ifriqiya.
- June – Ibrahim II lands with an Aghlabid expeditionary force in Trapani, and proceeds to Palermo. He crushes the reinforced Byzantine army at Giardini.
- August 1 – Taormina, the last Byzantine stronghold in Sicily, is captured by the Aghlabid army. After nearly 75 years, all of Sicily is in Aghlabid hands.
- September – Ibrahim II crosses the Strait of Messina into Calabria. He begins his march to conquer the rest of Italy, and lays siege at Cosenza.
- October 23 – Ibrahim II dies of dysentery in a chapel near Cosenza. His grandson, Ziyadat Allah, takes over the army, but lifts the siege.
- Winter – The Balearic Islands are conquered by the Emirate of Córdoba. The Moors improve agriculture with irrigation on the islands.

==== Britain And Ireland ====
- December 13 – Battle of the Holme: The Anglo-Saxon army is defeated by the Danish Vikings under Æthelwold (a son of Æthelred I) at Holme. Æthelwold is killed, ending his revolt against King Edward the Elder.
- Winter – The Norsemen are expelled from Dublin. After a brief foray into Seisyllwg (Wales), a group, under the Viking lord Ingimundr, settle in the Wirral with the agreement of Lady Æthelflæd of the Mercians.

==== Arabian Empire ====
- April 5 – Caliph Al-Mu'tadid dies in Baghdad after a 10-year reign. Possibly poisoned in a palace intrigue, he is succeeded by his eldest son Al-Muktafi as ruler of the Abbasid Caliphate.
- The Kutama tribe under Abu Abdallah al-Shi'i revolt against the Aghlabids. He begins a campaign and dispatches an invitation to the Fatimid spiritual leader Ubayd Allah al-Mahdi Billah to support him.
- Moorish Andalusian merchants set up a trade settlement (so-called emporium) in Oran (modern Algeria).

==== Asia ====
- Spring – Emperor Zhao Zong appoints Yang Xingmi as the overall commander of the Eastern circuits in China. He receives the title of Prince Wuzhong of Wu.
- The Kingdom of Nanzhao in East Asia is overthrown, followed by three dynasties in quick succession, before the establishment of the Kingdom of Dali in 937.

== Births ==
- November 25 – Tai Zong, emperor of the Liao dynasty (d. 947)
- Ælfweard, king of Wessex (approximate date)
- Du, empress of the Song dynasty (approximate date)
- Eadgifu, queen and wife of Charles the Simple
- Han Xizai, Chinese official and calligrapher (d. 970)
- Lady Xu Xinyue, wife of Qian Yuanguan (d. 946)
- Lothar I, Frankish nobleman (d. 929)
- Wang Jun, chancellor of Later Zhou (or 903)

== Deaths ==
- February 16 – Mary the Younger, Byzantine saint (b. 875)
- April 5 – Al-Mu'tadid, Abbasid caliph
- August 14 – Badr al-Mu'tadidi, Abbasid commander-in-chief
- October 23 – Ibrahim II, Aghlabid emir (b. 850)
- December 5 – Ealhswith, queen and wife of Alfred the Great
- December 16 – Wei Yifan, chancellor of the Tang dynasty
- Æthelwold, son of Æthelred of Wessex
- Amr ibn al-Layth, Saffarid emir
- Anscar I, margrave of Ivrea (Italy)
- Li Cunxin, general of the Tang dynasty (b. 862)
- Wang Zongdi, Chinese official and governor
- Yunju Daoying, Chinese Buddhist teacher (b. 830)
