= Siege of Taormina (902) =

Part of the Arab–Byzantine wars and the Muslim conquest of Sicily

- Part of the Arab–Byzantine wars and the Muslim conquest of Sicily
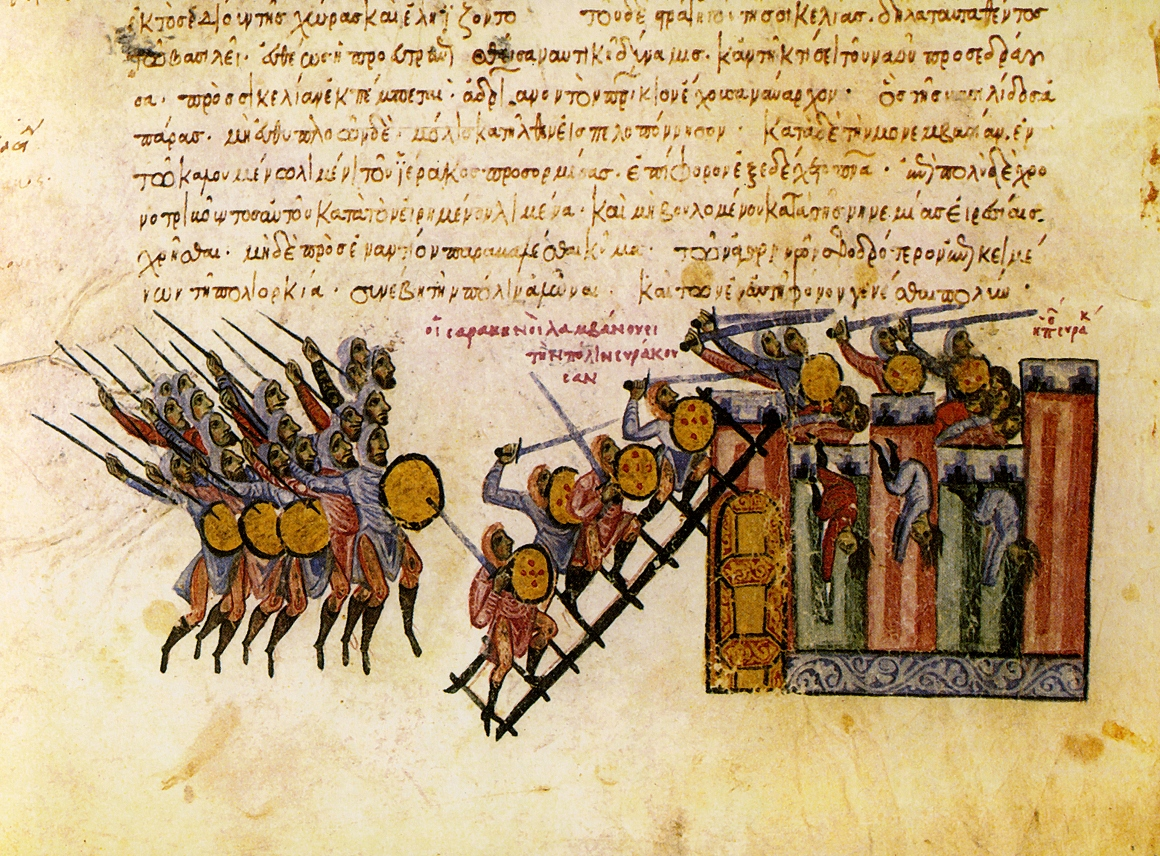
- Arabs capture a Byzantine city in Sicily, miniature from the Madrid Skylitzes
Date	July – 1 August 902
Location	Taormina, Sicily 37°51′25″N 15°16′39″E
Result	Aghlabid-Abbasid victory
Territorial changes	Taormina and much of Val Demone captured by the Aghlabids

Belligerents
Aghlabid Emirate	Byzantine Empire

Commanders and leaders
Ibrahim II	Eustathios, Michael Charaktos, Constantine Karamallos
- Location within Sicily

The siege of Taormina in 902 ended the conquest of the Byzantine city of Taormina, in northeastern Sicily, by the Aghlabids. The campaign was led by the deposed Aghlabid emir, Ibrahim II, as a form of armed pilgrimage and holy war. Ibrahim's forces defeated the Byzantine garrison in a hard-fought battle in front of the city walls, and laid siege to the city. Left unsupported by the Byzantine government, Taormina capitulated on 1 August. The population was massacred or sold into slavery. The fall of this last major Byzantine stronghold signalled the completion of the Muslim conquest of Sicily, which had been ongoing since the 820s, although some minor Byzantine outposts survived until the 960s.

== Background ==
Following the fall of Syracuse to the Aghlabids of Ifriqiya (roughly present day Tunisia) in 878, Byzantine presence in Sicily had been limited to the northeastern third of the island (the "Val Demone"). In the aftermath of their capture of Syracuse, the Aghlabids launched repeated raids against the Val Demone in the 880s, but made little headway. As the main stronghold remaining in Byzantine hands, the city of Taormina and its environs was one of the chief targets of the Aghlabid attacks during this period, being attacked in 879/80, 881/82, 883, 885, and 889. From c. 890 on, the raids ceased, chiefly due to the outbreak of internal quarrels among the Muslims of Sicily, which even resulted in full civil war between the Arab and Berber factions of the Aghlabid army in 898.

The civil war in Sicily prompted the dispatch of Abu'l-Abbas Abdallah, son of the Aghlabid emir Ibrahim II, as the island's governor in 900. When Abu'l-Abbas landed at Sicily, factional strife had mutated to a quarrel between the cities of Palermo and Agrigento, the precise nature of which is unknown. After negotiations failed, Abu'l-Abbas Abdallah marched on Palermo, which he captured on 18 September 900. A great number of the rebels fled the city to the Byzantines in Taormina, with some reaching even Constantinople itself. The Byzantines tried to take advantage of the revolt, and began assembling forces at Messina and Reggio, while a fleet was dispatched from Constantinople under a commander named Michael. Abu'l-Abbas, however, did not tarry and as soon as he had suppressed the rebellion, marched against the Byzantines, ravaging the environs of Taormina and launching an unsuccessful siege of Catania before returning to winter in Palermo. In the next spring, he resumed his attack and assaulted Demona. To disrupt the Byzantine preparations, his forces then crossed over to the Italian mainland, sacking Reggio. On his return to Sicily, Abu'l-Abbas defeated a Byzantine fleet and captured thirty of its ships.

== Ibrahim II's arrival and the fall of Taormina ==
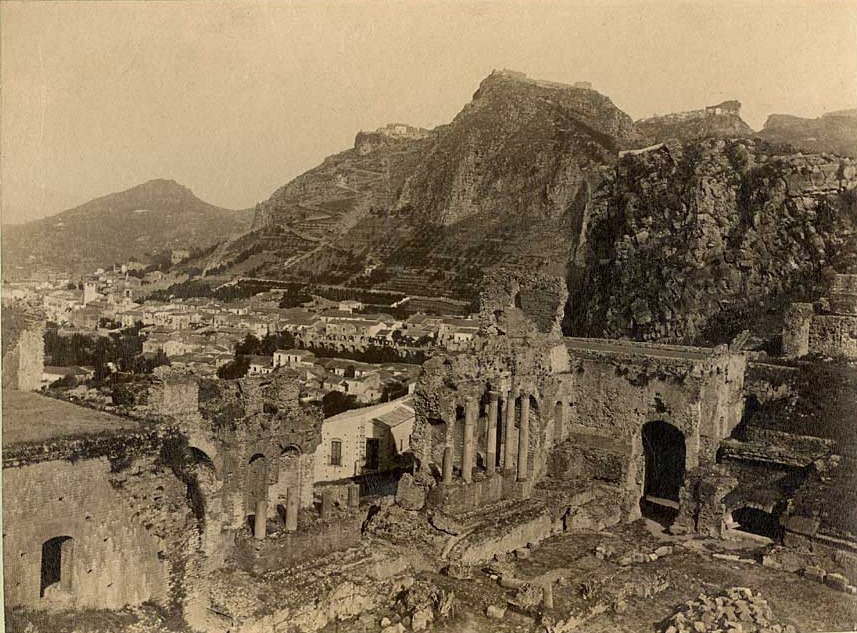
View of the citadel hill (Castello di Monte Tauro) of Taormina from the city's ruined ancient theatre, photo by Wilhelm von Gloeden, c. 1890

In early 902, Emir Ibrahim II was forced into abdication by his subjects, through the intervention of the Abbasid caliph al-Mu'tadid. Abu'l-Abbas was named as his successor, and left Sicily for Ifriqiya, leaving his army under the command of his two sons. Ibrahim, in turn, resolved to make an armed pilgrimage, and took up the mantle of the holy war, aiming to go to Mecca after first conquering Byzantine fortresses in Italy. Donning the simple dress of an ascetic, he went to Sousse, where he declared his intention and started gathering volunteers to join him.

Ibrahim and his followers arrived at Trapani on 8 July, and immediately set their sights on Taormina, the last major Byzantine stronghold on Sicily. The Byzantines had gathered significant forces there, commanded by the droungarios of the Fleet Eustathios, Michael Charaktos (apparently the same as the naval commander who arrived in 901, and now served as strategos of Calabria), and the commandant of Taormina, the patrikios Constantine Karamallos, who was likely also the strategos of Sicily. Rather than waiting to be besieged, the Byzantine commanders led their forces out to meet the Muslims in open combat. According to the Muslim sources, the battle that followed was fiercely contested, and the Byzantines were beginning to gain the upper hand, when Ibrahim ordered the recitation of a line from the al-Hajj sura of the Quran. Crying for help from God, he entered the fray in person, whereupon the Byzantines were defeated with heavy losses. Most of the remaining Byzantine troops either withdrew to the fortress (modern Castello di Mola) or embarked on their ships.

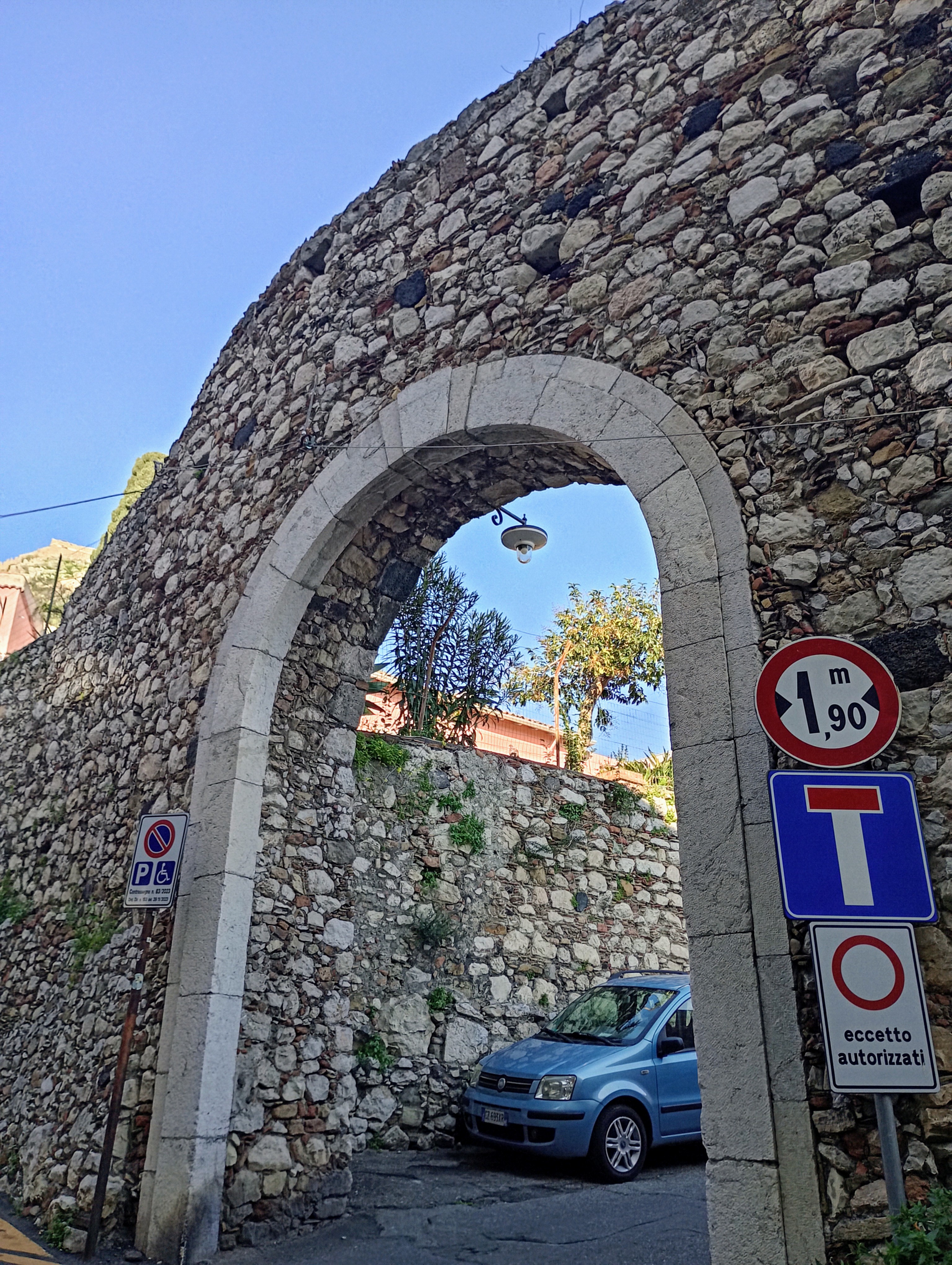
Porta Saracena (Porta Cuseni) where Ibrahim's forces entered Taormina

Ibrahim immediately laid siege to the city, which surrendered on 1 August. The remaining garrison, as well as many of the women and children, were massacred, and the rest sold into slavery. The local bishop, Prokopios, was brought before Ibrahim, who demanded of him to convert to Islam. When the bishop refused, he was tortured and decapitated; his corpse and those of other executed prisoners were burned.

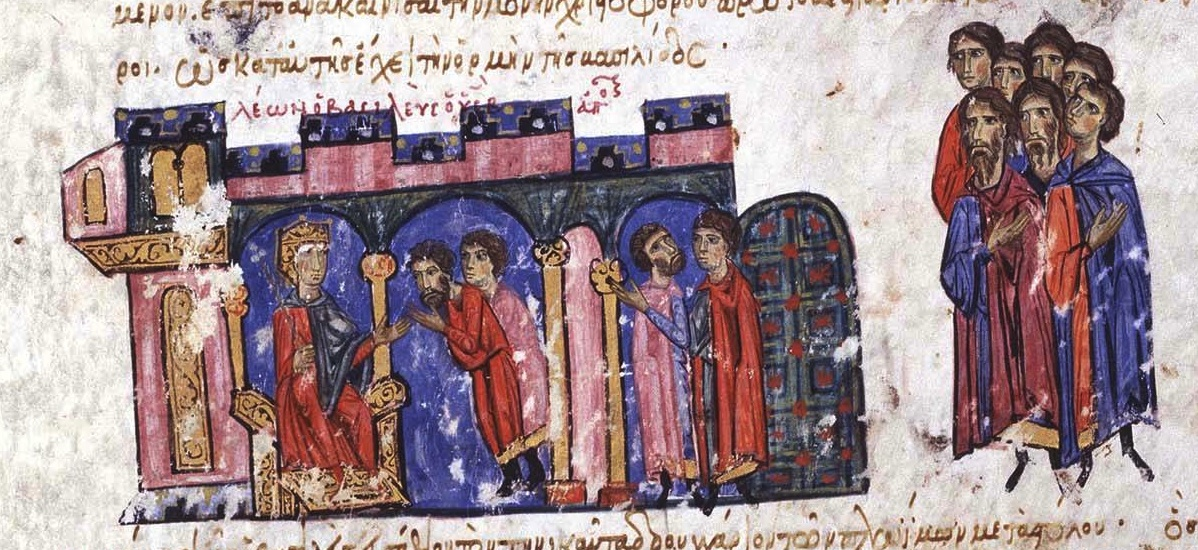
Messengers inform Emperor Leo VI of Arab attacks, miniature from the Madrid Skylitzes

According to an Arab source, the Byzantine emperor Leo VI the Wise mourned the fall of Taormina by refusing to wear his crown for seven days, but the Byzantine sources—Patriarch Nicholas Mystikos and the Continuator of George Hamartolos—are explicit in attributing the loss of Taormina to negligence: according to the latter, the fleet was not sent to relieve the city because it was busy carrying material for the construction of two churches founded by the emperor in Constantinople. The news also spread panic, as a rumour started circulating that Ibrahim intended to march onto Constantinople itself. The Byzantine commanders managed to escape the city and return to Constantinople, but Michael Charaktos accused Eustathios and Constantine Karamallos of treason. The two men were condemned to death, but the intercession of the Patriarch Nicholas Mystikos commuted their sentence to life-long banishment to a monastery.

== Aftermath ==
Ibrahim capitalized on his success by sending raiding parties against various strongholds in the vicinity, forcing either their capitulation and destruction or the payment of tribute. In this manner, Demona, Rometta, and Aci were captured or forced to pay tribute in token of submission. The locals were encouraged to convert to Islam, or, where they had left their forts and fled for the mountains, the walls were torn down and the wells blocked with stones to make them uninhabitable.

Indefatigable, Ibrahim crossed over into the mainland in early September, where cities as far as Naples began to prepare to resist his attack. In the end, his advance was stopped at the siege of Cosenza, where Ibrahim died of dysentery on October 23. Fortunately for the Aghlabids, the inhabitants of Cosenza, unaware of this, offered terms. This allowed Ibrahim's grandson, Ziyadat Allah, to end the military campaign with a token success, and return to Sicily laden with booty.

Although a few strongholds in the northeast remained unconquered and in Christian hands, the fall of Taormina marked the effective end of Byzantine Sicily, and the consolidation of Muslim control over the island. It was not until the 960s that the last Byzantine enclaves—including Taormina and Rometta, which had returned to Byzantine control—would be finally captured, by the Fatimid Caliphate.

== Sources ==
- Eickhoff, Ekkehard (1966). Seekrieg und Seepolitik zwischen Islam und Abendland: das Mittelmeer unter byzantinischer und arabischer Hegemonie (650–1040) (in German). De Gruyter.
- Lilie, Ralph-Johannes; Ludwig, Claudia; Pratsch, Thomas; Zielke, Beate (2013). Prosopographie der mittelbyzantinischen Zeit Online. Berlin-Brandenburgische Akademie der Wissenschaften. Nach Vorarbeiten F. Winkelmanns erstellt (in German). Berlin and Boston: De Gruyter.
- Metcalfe, Alex (2009). The Muslims of Medieval Italy. Edinburgh: Edinburgh University Press. ISBN 978-0-7486-2008-1.
- Tougher, Shaun (1997). The Reign of Leo VI (886–912): Politics and People. Leiden: Brill. ISBN 978-9-00-410811-0.
- Vasiliev, Alexander A. (1968). Byzance et les Arabes, Tome II: Les relations politiques de Byzance et des Arabes à l'époque de la dynastie macédonienne (les empereurs Basile I, Léon le Sage et Constantin VII Porphyrogénète) 867-959 (253-348). Première partie: Les relations politiques de Byzance et des Arabes à l'époque de la dynastie macédonienne. Première période, de 867 à 959. Corpus Bruxellense Historiae Byzantinae (in French). Vol. 2.1. French ed.: Henri Grégoire, Marius Canard. Brussels: Fondation Byzantine.
