= Siege of Enna =

859 siege by the Aghlabids against the Byzantine city of Enna

- Part of the Muslim conquest of Sicily
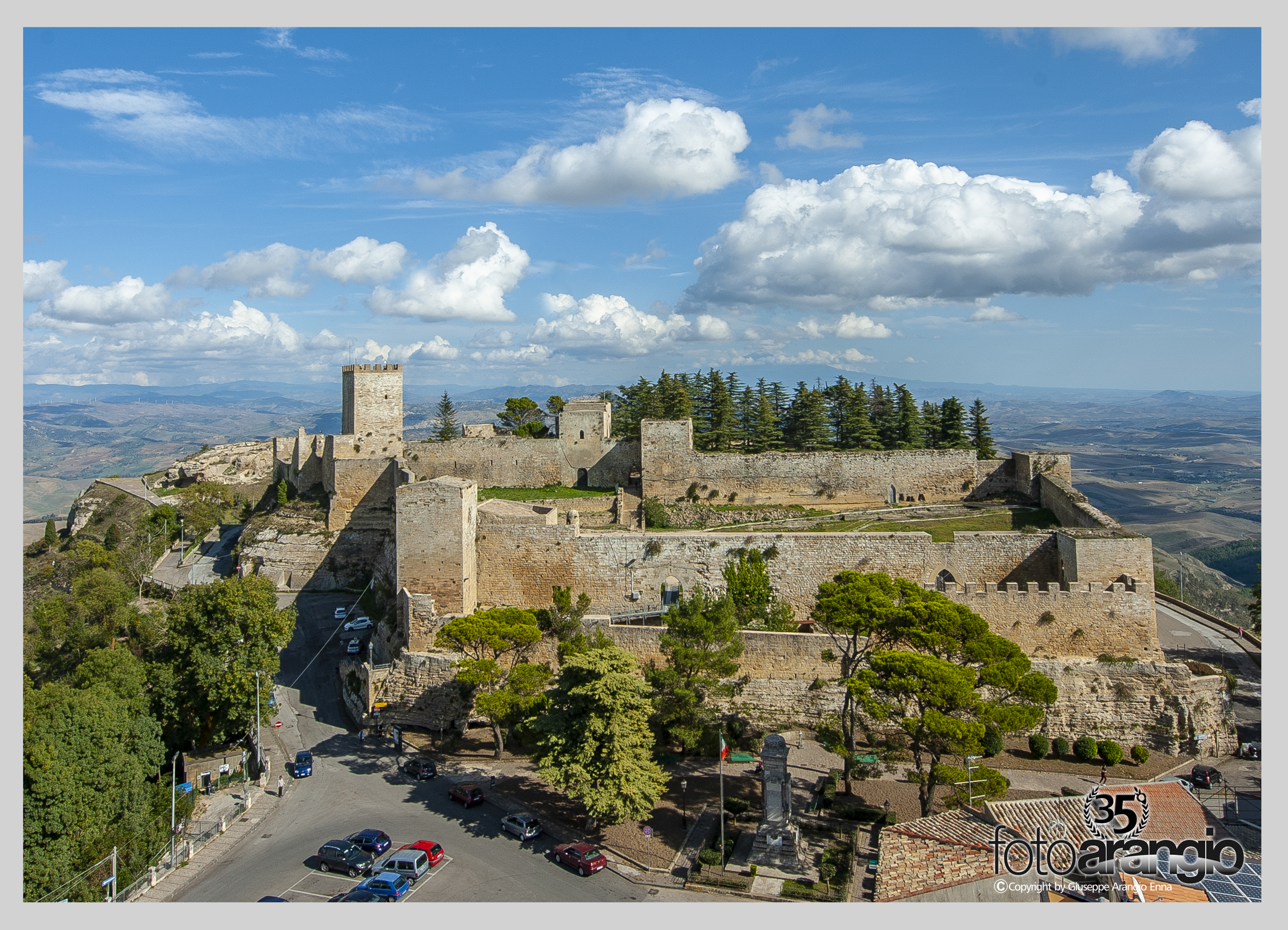
- Castle of Enna
Date	24 January 859
Location	Enna
Result	Aghlabid victory

Belligerents
Byzantine Empire	Aghlabids

Commanders and leaders
Theodotus	Al-Abbas bin Fadhl

Strength
Unknown	2,000 cavalry

Casualties and losses
Unknown	Unknown

The siege of Enna or Castrogiovanni was launched by the Aghlabids against the important Byzantine city of Enna in 859. The Aghlabid forces managed to capture the city.

== Siege ==
Following the fall of Palermo in 831, the key to Byzantine defense became the fortified city of Castrogiovanni (modern-day Enna), governed by Theodotus. The city is on a high mountain, dominating all neighboring heights. Aiming to capture the city, as it was the seat of the Byzantine government of Sicily. Castrogiovanni was accessible by two tortuous and narrow gorges.

A party of Arabs whom the governor, Abbas bin al-Fadhl, had sent to ravage the outskirts of Enna. They managed to capture a Greek prisoner. Abbas ordered him to be executed. The prisoner begged for mercy in exchange for helping them capture Enna, and Abbas agreed to this offer. The Byzantine garrison did not expect any attack and minimized their defenses.

Abbas, with a cavalry force of 2,000, headed towards Castrogiovanni. Taking advantage of the darkness, Abbas dispatched a contingent under his uncle, Rabah, to a secret passage the prisoner had told them about. An aqueduct leads to the center of Castrogiovanni. The Arabs entered the aqueduct, then proceeded to kill the defenders of the city and open the gates for Abbas.

The city fell on January 24. The Arabs captured immense wealth and many prisoners, and part of them were sent to the Abbasid caliph, al-Mutawakkil. Abbas ordered the construction of a mosque to celebrate this victory in the palace of the Patricians.

== Aftermath ==
The capture of Castrogiovanni destroyed the Byzantine power in Sicily and forced them to relocate their seat to Syracuse. Due to this defeat, the Byzantine emperor, Michael III, dispatched a navy of 300 ships to rescue Castrogiovanni under the command of Constantine Kontomytes. The Byzantine Navy suffered a crushing defeat and lost 100 of their ships.

== Sources ==
- Tony Jaques (2006), Dictionary of Battles and Sieges, A Guide to 8,500 Battles from Antiquity Through the Twenty-first Century [3 Volumes].
- Alexander A. Vasiliev, Byzance et les Arabes. Tome I, La dynastie d'Amorium (820–867).
- F. Elie de La Primaudaie, Les Arabes En Sicile Et En Italie: Les Normands En Sicile Et En Italie.
- J. B. Bury (2023), The History of the Byzantine Empire, From the Fall of Irene to the Accession of Basil I.
