= Siege of Syracuse (877–878) =

Capture of Syracuse in Sicily by the Aghlabids

- Part of the Muslim conquest of Sicily (Arab–Byzantine wars)
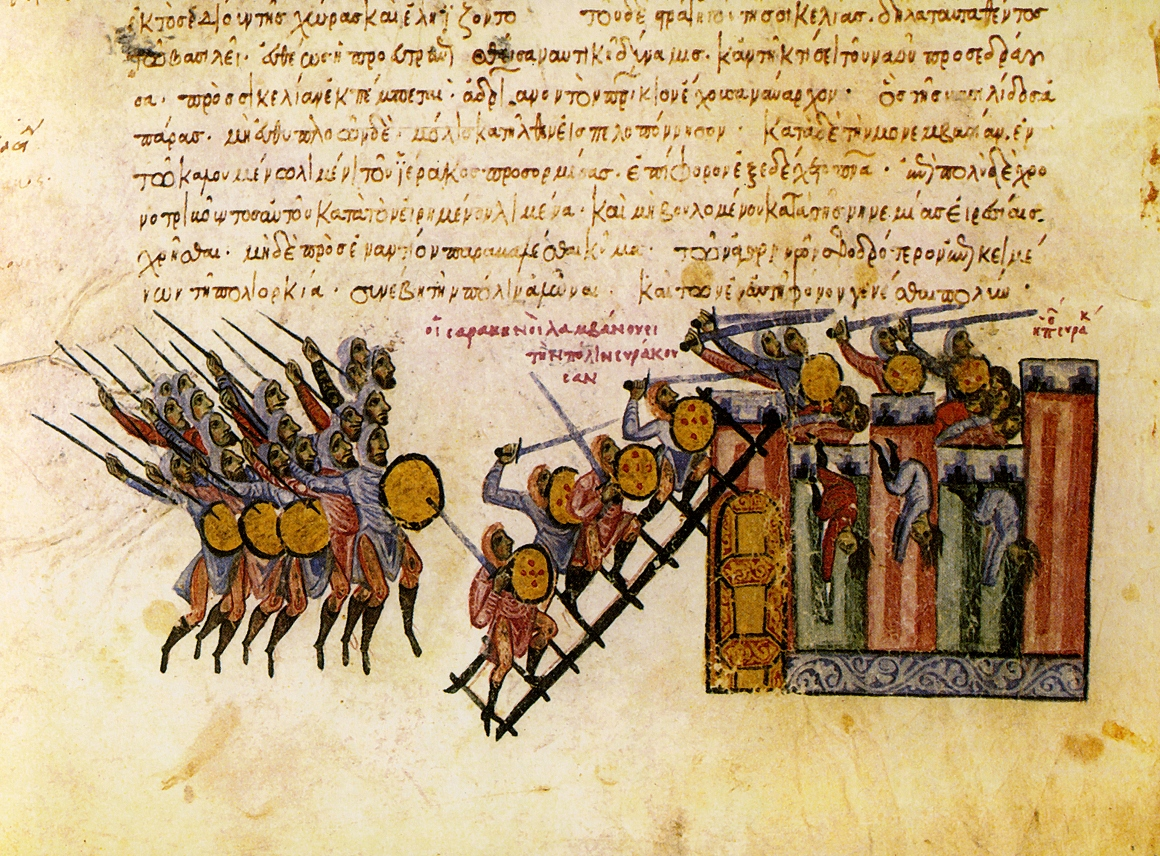
- The capture of Syracuse, miniature from the Madrid Skylitzes
Date	August 877 – 21 May 878
Location	Syracuse, Sicily 37°04′09″N 15°17′15″E
Result	Aghlabid victory

Belligerents
Byzantine Empire	Aghlabid Emirate

Commanders and leaders
Unknown patrikios of city (executed) or Stavarakius (executed)	Ja'far ibn Muhammad; Abu Ishaq; Abu Isa ibn Muhammad ibn Qurhub

Casualties and losses
Extremely Heavy	Unknown

The siege of Syracuse from 877 to 878 led to the fall of the city of Syracuse, the Byzantine capital of Sicily, to the Aghlabids. The siege lasted from August 877 to 21 May 878 when the city, effectively left without assistance by the central Byzantine government, was taken by the Aghlabid forces.

Following their first landing in Sicily in the late 820s, the Aghlabids had tried several times, without success, to capture Syracuse; they were, however, able to gradually take over the western half of the island. In 875, a new and energetic governor, Ja'far ibn Muhammad, was appointed, determined to capture the city. Ja'far began the siege in August 877 but soon left it in charge of his son Abu Ishaq, while he retired to Palermo.

The Arabs were well-supplied with siege weapons, while the inhabitants of Syracuse were left largely unsupported by the Byzantine fleet, which was busy with transporting marble for a new church in Constantinople and was then delayed by adverse weather. Consequently, the besieged populace faced great hardships and famine as described in detail by the eyewitness account of Theodosios the Monk. Finally, the Aghlabids managed to effect a breach in the seaward walls and on 21 May 878 managed to break through it into the city. The defenders were either taken as hostages or fell in battle while some of the populace, including Theodosios, were taken prisoner. According to Chronographiae quae Theophanis Continuati nomine venit, a governor named Estavarakius and his extremely large troops were also defeated and executed by the invaders.

The Byzantine patrikios, who commanded the defense, surrendered with a few of his men, but they were executed after a week, while a handful of soldiers escaped and brought the news east to the fleet that had belatedly set sail to aid the city. The Aghlabids were unable to capitalize upon this success due to internal rivalries, which even led to a full-scale civil war. Small-scale warfare with the Byzantines continued without any side gaining a decisive advantage until the arrival of the deposed Aghlabid emir Ibrahim II, who in 902 rallied the Sicilian Muslims and captured Taormina, effectively completing the Muslim conquest of Sicily, although a few fortresses remained in Byzantine hands until 965.

== Background ==
The Aghlabids had tried and failed to take Syracuse in 827–828, soon after their initial landing on the island. Despite their repulse there, they managed to establish themselves in the western portions of the island, and in the decades that followed they gradually pushed eastward into the central parts of Sicily. During this period they undertook repeated efforts to capture the capital of the Byzantine province, in 868, 869, and 873, but these failed as well.

In 875, the Aghlabid emir Muhammad II ibn Ahmad (r. 864–875) died, and was succeeded by his more energetic brother, Ibrahim II (r. 875–902). The new emir was determined to finally capture Syracuse. He appointed a new governor for the island, Ja'far ibn Muhammad, and sent a fleet from the Aghlabid metropolis of Ifriqiya to assist the local Sicilian troops.

== Siege ==
Ja'far began his campaign in 877 by raiding the Byzantine territories in the east of the island and occupying some outlying forts around Syracuse. The siege of the city began in August, with the Arabs blockading it by sea and land. The events of the siege are described in some detail by the eyewitness Theodosios the Monk, who included an account of it in a letter written during his subsequent captivity.

The resistance of the city was led by an unnamed patrikios, while the Arabs were led initially by Ja'far until he returned to Palermo and left the conduct of the siege to his son, Abu Ishaq. The Muslims, well supplied with siege weapons, including a new type of mangonel, launched incessant attacks on the city's defenders by day and night. Theodosios focuses most of his account on the sufferings of the inhabitants, "reduced by starvation and disease," and the "hyper-inflationary prices paid for paltry amounts of staple foods," as described by Alex Metcalfe. Cut off from their water supplies, the people resorted to drinking from the Fountain of Arethusa. A bushel of wheat came to cost 150 gold nomismata, a bushel of flour 200, an ox 300 nomismata, and the head of a horse or a donkey 15 to 20 nomismata. After several months of siege, the inhabitants had exhausted their supplies of oil, fruit, cheese, fish, and vegetables; they were reduced to eating grass, animal skins, ground bones mixed with water, and even, according to Theodosios, resorting to cannibalism and eating their dead and the children.

Geophysical map of Sicily with main settlements

Despite the importance of Syracuse, the sources report scant efforts from the Byzantines to aid the city. Ibn al-Athir reports that a few Byzantine vessels appeared before the city and were defeated without difficulty, but the main Byzantine fleet appears to have been occupied with ferrying building material for the erection of Emperor Basil I the Macedonian's Nea Ekklesia church in Constantinople. When the fleet eventually sailed, under the command of a certain Adrianos, it was so delayed by contrary winds at Monemvasia that news of the city's fall reached it there. Unchallenged thus in their control of the sea, the Arabs were able to destroy the fortifications (βραχιόλια) protecting the city's two harbours: the incessant bombardment succeeded in collapsing one of the towers of the seaward fortifications, along with the adjoining stretch of walls, forming a breach where the Arabs concentrated their attack. Nevertheless, the patrikios of the city rallied the defenders, and for twenty days they managed to hold the breach against superior numbers, so that the surrounding area was filled with the dead and wounded.

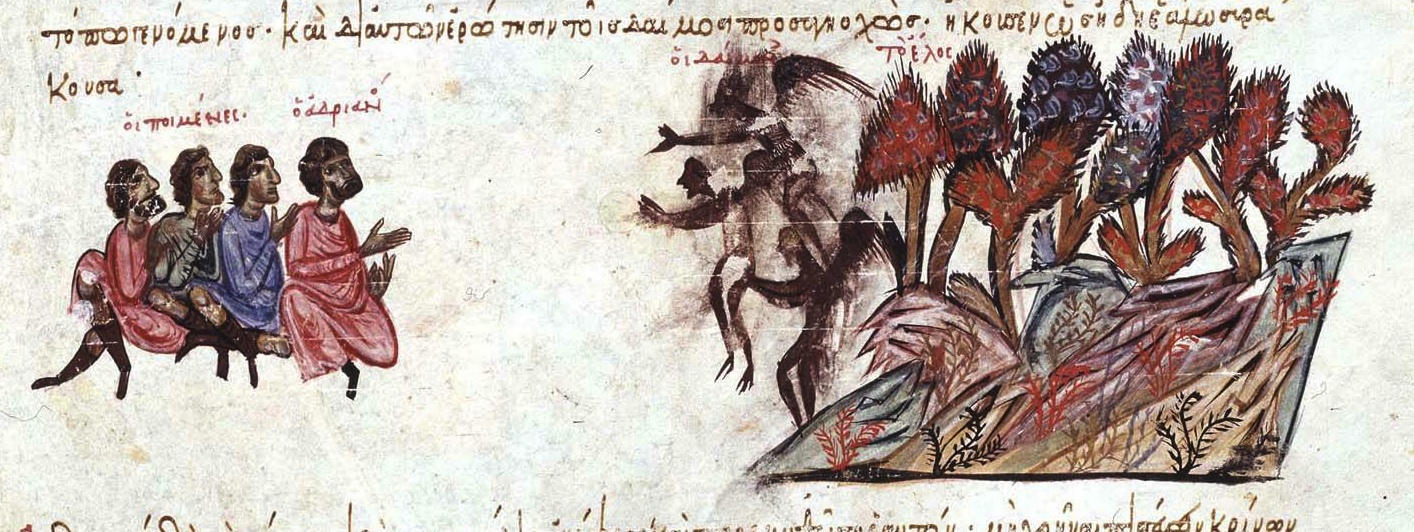
Admiral Adrianos is informed of the fall of Syracuse by demons. Miniature from the Madrid Skylitzes.

The city finally fell on the morning of 21 May 878 after nine months of siege. The defenders had withdrawn to the walls to rest and eat breakfast, leaving a small guard to hold the breach under a certain John Patrianos, when the Arabs launched a sudden attack, firing all their siege engines at once and charging the breach. By the time the patrikios came forth to rally the defense, the Arabs had killed the defenders of the breach and broken through into the city. A detachment that tried to blockade the way near the Church of the Saviour was likewise annihilated; Theodosios writes that the Arabs entered the church, where much of the populace had sought refuge, and massacred them all. The patrikios was left with some 70 men to hold an isolated tower, until he was forced to surrender the next day. Theodosios himself was assisting the liturgy in the cathedral when news of the city's fall came, and was taken prisoner along with the archbishop. Unlike the Church of the Saviour, the Arab soldiers did not mistreat them, but forced the archbishop to reveal the location of the sacristy where the precious liturgical objects were held.

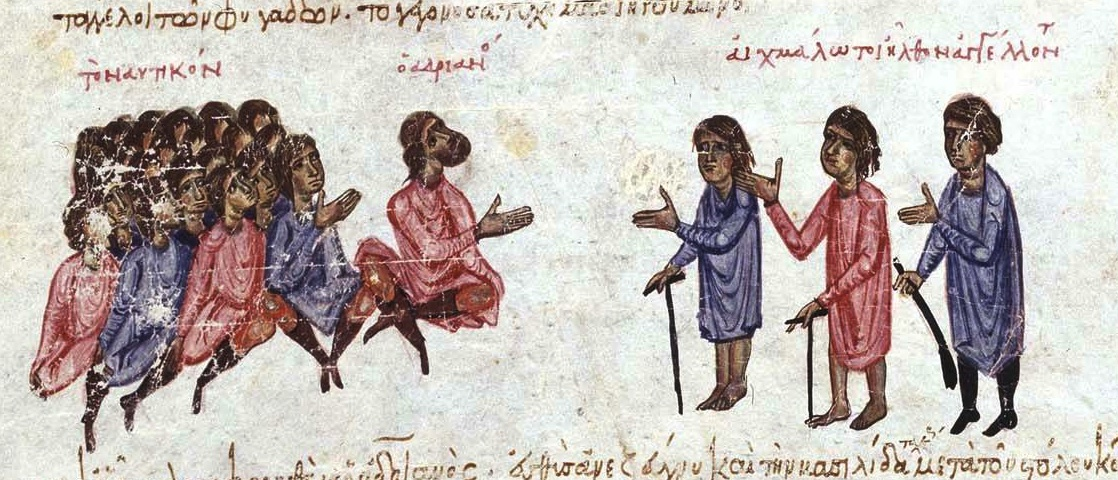
Refugees confirm the fall of Syracuse to Admiral Adrianos.

Most of the population of the city was massacred during the sack; Theodosios writes that among the notables alone, over 4,000 were killed. The Arab commander, Abu Ishaq, had the commanding patrikios executed a week later, while the seventy men left with him along with other prisoners were reportedly taken out of the city and beaten to death with stones and clubs. One of the defenders, Niketas of Tarsos, who during the siege had insulted Muhammad daily, was taken apart and tortured to death. Only a few Mardaites from the Peloponnese along with some soldiers of the garrison were able to escape and, reaching Greece, inform admiral Adrianos of the events. The city itself was pillaged and practically destroyed. According to Ibn al-Athir, the Arabs remained there for about two months after the sack before returning to their base, leaving the city in ruins. Ibn al-Athir also claims that a Byzantine squadron appeared before the city, but that it was driven off after a battle in which the Byzantines lost four ships.

== Aftermath ==
Ja'far did not long enjoy his victory. In the same year, he was killed by two of his slaves at the instigation of his uncle and his brother, who then usurped the governorship. This heralded a period of internal strife among Sicilian Muslims. Warfare continued through the 880s, with the Arabs attempting to subdue the remaining Byzantine strongholds in the northeastern third of the island with limited success: the raids yielded booty to pay the army, but no forts were taken. The same period also saw a resurgence of Byzantine strength in the Italian mainland, where generals like Nikephoros Phokas the Elder won a string of victories against the Muslims.

The lack of success exacerbated the tensions between the Muslims, leading to the rebellion of the Palermitans in 886 and again in 890, as manifold divisions—between the Arabs and Berbers, between the Sicilians and the Ifriqiyans, and between Palermitans and Agrigentans—came to the fore. A full-scale civil war between Arabs and Berbers erupted in 898, and was not ended until Ibrahim II's son Abu'l-Abbas Abdallah captured Palermo in 900. Abdallah also won victories against the Byzantines, until he was recalled to Ifriqiya to replace his father; Ibrahim then came to Sicily with a group of volunteers, and captured the last major Byzantine stronghold, Taormina, in August 902. Although a few fortresses in the northeast remained unconquered and in Christian hands up to the fall of Rometta in 965, the capture of Taormina marked the effective end of Byzantine Sicily and the consolidation of Muslim control over the island.

== Sources ==
- Kazhdan, Alexander, ed. (1991). The Oxford Dictionary of Byzantium. Oxford and New York: Oxford University Press. ISBN 0-19-504652-8.
- Lilie, Ralph-Johannes; Ludwig, Claudia; Pratsch, Thomas; Zielke, Beate (2013). Prosopographie der mittelbyzantinischen Zeit Online. Berlin-Brandenburgische Akademie der Wissenschaften. Nach Vorarbeiten F. Winkelmanns erstellt (in German). Berlin and Boston: De Gruyter.
- Metcalfe, Alex (2009). The Muslims of Medieval Italy. Edinburgh: Edinburgh University Press. ISBN 978-0-7486-2008-1.
- Vasiliev, Alexander A. (1968). Byzance et les Arabes, Tome II: Les relations politiques de Byzance et des Arabes à l'époque de la dynastie macédonienne (les empereurs Basile I, Léon le Sage et Constantin VII Porphyrogénète) 867-959 (253-348). Première partie: Les relations politiques de Byzance et des Arabes à l'époque de la dynastie macédonienne. Première période, de 867 à 959. Corpus Bruxellense Historiae Byzantinae (in French). Vol. 2.1. French ed.: Henri Grégoire, Marius Canard. Brussels: Fondation Byzantine.
