= 903 =

Calendar year

903 in various calendars
- Gregorian calendar: 903; CMIII
- Ab urbe condita: 1656
- Armenian calendar: 352; ԹՎ ՅԾԲ
- Assyrian calendar: 5653
- Balinese saka calendar: 824–825
- Bengali calendar: 309–310
- Berber calendar: 1853
- Buddhist calendar: 1447
- Burmese calendar: 265
- Byzantine calendar: 6411–6412
- Chinese calendar: 壬戌年 (Water Dog); 3600 or 3393 — to — 癸亥年 (Water Pig); 3601 or 3394
- Coptic calendar: 619–620
- Discordian calendar: 2069
- Ethiopian calendar: 895–896
- Hebrew calendar: 4663–4664
- Hindu calendars
- Vikram Samvat: 959–960
- Shaka Samvat: 824–825
- Kali Yuga: 4003–4004
- Holocene calendar: 10903
- Iranian calendar: 281–282
- Islamic calendar: 290–291
- Japanese calendar: Engi 3 (延喜３年)
- Javanese calendar: 801–803
- Julian calendar: 903; CMIII
- Korean calendar: 3236
- Minguo calendar: 1009 before ROC 民前1009年
- Nanakshahi calendar: −565
- Seleucid era: 1214/1215 AG
- Thai solar calendar: 1445–1446
- Tibetan calendar: ཆུ་ཕོ་ཁྱི་ལོ་ (male Water-Dog); 1029 or 648 or −124 — to — ཆུ་མོ་ཕག་ལོ་ (female Water-Boar); 1030 or 649 or −123

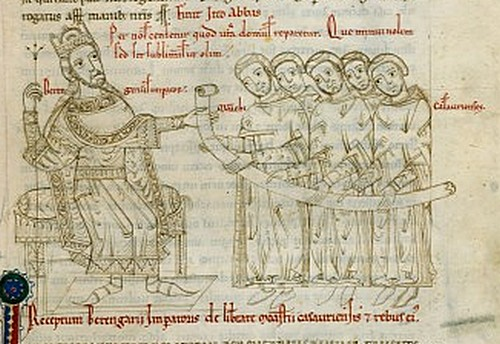
King Berengar I and the monks of Casauria

Year 903 (CMIII) was a common year starting on Saturday of the Julian calendar.

== Events ==
=== By place ===
==== Europe ====
- King Berengar I of Italy issues concessions and privileges to the Lombard nobility and monasteries. He grants concessions to Bobbio Abbey in Emilia-Romagna (Northeast Italy).
- King Louis IV ("the Child") promulgates the Raffelstetten customs regulations, a legal document for a toll-bridge on the Danube River in Asten (modern Austria).

==== Britain ====
- The Danish Vikings invade Anglesey after being driven out of Dublin (see 902). They fail to gain a foothold in Wales, and sail on to Chester.
- A party of Danes under the Viking warlord Ingimundr attack the Welsh in a pitched battle at Maes Ros Meilon, perhaps near Llanfaes.

==== Arabian Empire ====
- November 29 – Battle of Hama: Abbasid forces under Muhammad ibn Sulayman al-Katib defeat the Qarmatians near Hama, on the banks of the Orontes River (modern Syria). The Qarmatian army is scattered and pursued by Abbasid troops; Al-Husayn ibn Zikrawayh and other Qarmatian leaders are captured.

=== By topic ===
==== Religion ====
- July – Pope Benedict IV dies after a 3-year reign. He is succeeded by Leo V as the 118th pope of the Catholic Church. Leo is imprisoned and tortured by Antipope Christopher after a reign of just 1 month. Christopher makes himself the new pope of Rome.

== Births ==
- December 7 – Abd al-Rahman al-Sufi, Persian astronomer (d. 986)
- Feng Yanji, chancellor of Southern Tang (d. 960)
- Kūya, Japanese priest of Pure Land Buddhism (d. 972)
- Li Gu, chancellor of Later Zhou (d. 960)
- Wang Jun, chancellor of Later Zhou (or 902)

== Deaths ==
- March 6
  - Lu Guangqi, Chinese official and chancellor
  - Su Jian, Chinese official and chancellor
- March 26 – Sugawara no Michizane, Japanese politician and poet (b. 845)
- June 10 – Cheng Rui, Chinese warlord
- July 27– Abdallah II of Ifriqiya, Aghlabid emir
- July – Benedict IV, pope of the Catholic Church
- December 24 – Hedwiga, duchess of Saxony
- December 30 – Tian Jun, Chinese warlord (b. 858)
- Adalhard of Babenberg, Frankish nobleman
- Moses Bar-Kepha, Syriac bishop and writer
- Théodrate of Troyes, Frankish queen (b. 868)
- Zhu Yanshou, Chinese governor (b. 870)
