= Battle of Syracuse (868) =

- Part of the Muslim conquest of Sicily
| Date | 19 March 868 |
| Location | Syracuse, Sicily |
| Result | Aghlabid victory |

Belligerents
| Aghlabid dynasty | Byzantine Empire |

Commanders and leaders
| Khafaja ibn Sufyan; Muhammad bin Khafaja | Unnamed Patrician |

Strength
| Unknown | Unknown |

Casualties and losses
| Unknown | Thousands killed |

The Battle of Syracuse was a military engagement between the Aghlabids and the Byzantines near Syracuse. The Byzantines launched an expedition to re-establish their control over Sicily. The expedition ended in disaster for the Byzantines.

== Background ==
Following the accession of Basil I to the Byzantine throne in 867, he inherited a disastrous situation in Sicily, where only the eastern coast remained under imperial control, and even there, their hold was weakening daily. However, Basil aimed to improve this condition. Sicily was as integral to Basil's strategy as Italy and Dalmatia. By 867, the Arabs had the Byzantines almost completely surrounded, putting any relief force in a dangerous position. Reinforcements were further challenged because Arab control over the mainland in Italy and North Africa gave them dominance of the sea.

To successfully resolve the situation in Sicily, one of these Arab strongholds had to be removed. Since the empire still held a position on the more accessible mainland, much of Sicily's fate depended on what happened in Italy. At first, Basil followed the strategy of those before him. They had the mistaken belief that simply sending fresh troops and ships to the island could reverse the Muslim advance. Perhaps they hoped these small reinforcements would boost the morale of the inhabitants and lead to victory.

== Battle ==
In 868, after Basil’s successful campaign on the Adriatic coast, a large relief army led by a patrician was sent to Sicily. They arrived on March 19th, 868, just as the Aghlabid governor, Khafaja ibn Sufyan, was preparing his annual raid on Syracuse. The Arab strategy aimed to weaken Byzantine morale through continuous raids on their remaining strongholds. Hafaga commanded the land forces, while his son Mohammed led the naval attack with fireships. In the battle near the city, the Byzantine troops were decisively defeated, with thousands killed and the Arabs capturing significant booty, including arms and horses. Khafaja then pressed his advantage by attacking Syracuse itself, destroying crops and devastating the surrounding countryside. By June 26th, he returned to Palermo and dispatched Mohammed on a punitive raid against Gaeta.

== Sources ==
- Norman Tobias (1969), Basil I (867-886), the Founder of the Macedonian Dynasty: A Study of the Political and Military History of the Byzantine Empire in the Ninth Century.
- Alexander Vasiliev (1968), Byzantium and the Arabs, Vol. 2: Political relations between Byzantines and Arabs during the Macedonian Dynasty (In French).
