= Bardas Kontomytes =

Bardas Kontomytes or Contomytes was a member of the Amorian Dynasty of the Byzantine Empire.

He was the son of Irene, sister of Empress Theodora, and of Sergios, from whom he was related with the Patriarch Photios.

He received the supreme court rank of magistros (probably in the second half of the reign of Michael III, after the end of the regency in 856).

He married the daughter of the general Constantine Kontomytes, after which he assumed his father-in-law's surname (or sobriquet) of "Kontomytes".

His brother Stephen also became a magistros.

== Sources ==
- Lilie, Ralph-Johannes; Ludwig, Claudia; Zielke, Beate; Pratsch, Thomas, eds. (2013). "Prosopographie der mittelbyzantinischen Zeit Online". Prosopographie der mittelbyzantinischen Zeit Online. Berlin-Brandenburgische Akademie der Wissenschaften. Nach Vorarbeiten F. Winkelmanns erstellt (in German). De Gruyter.
