= Ibrahim ibn Allah =

Ibrahim ibn Allah ابراهيم بن الله
- Emir of Sicily (835 – 851)
- Predecessor: Al-Fadl ibn Yaq'ub al-Fazari
- Successor: Al-Abbas ibn al-Fadl ibn Ya'qub al-Fazari
Names
- Abu l-Aghlab Ibrahim ibn Allah ibn Ziyadat Allah ibn Ibrahim ibn Al-Aghlab ibn Salem ibn Aqal ibn Khafajah al-Tamimi
- Religion: Sunni Islam

Abu l-Aghlab Ibrahim ibn Allah was Emir of Palermo from 835 to 851. Grandson of Ziyadat Allah, Emir of Kairouan, on September 11, 835 left Africa for Sicily where after a naval battle against the Byzantines, he joined the government of Palermo.

During his emirate the Arab expansion continued in eastern Sicily. Cities such as Messina (842-843), Butera in 845, Ragusa, Moorish (848) were conquered.
