= Val Demone =

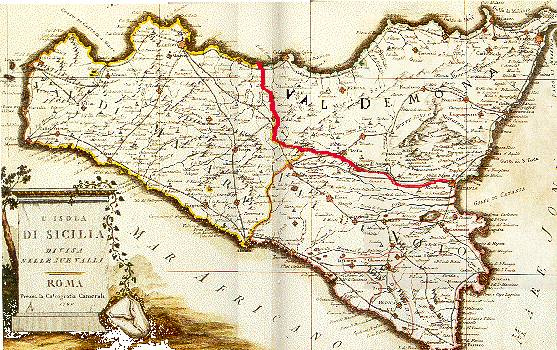
Old map of Sicily with the three valli; Val Demone delineated in red

Val Demone or Val di Demona is a historical and geographical region encompassing the north-eastern third of Sicily. Historically, it was one of the three valli of Sicily.

Val Demone was the last part of the island to be conquered by the Arabs in the 10th century. Christian refugees from other parts of Sicily congregated there, and the region remained in contact with the Byzantine provinces in southern Italy. It was the base for the Byzantine attempt to reconquer Sicily under George Maniakes in the early 11th century. Consequently it was the least Arabicized and Islamized part of Sicily.

== Sources ==
- Metcalfe, Alex (2009), The Muslims of medieval Italy, Edinburgh: Edinburgh University Press, ISBN 978-0-7486-2008-1
