= Ibrahim II of Ifriqiya =

Emir of Ifriqiya from 875 to 902

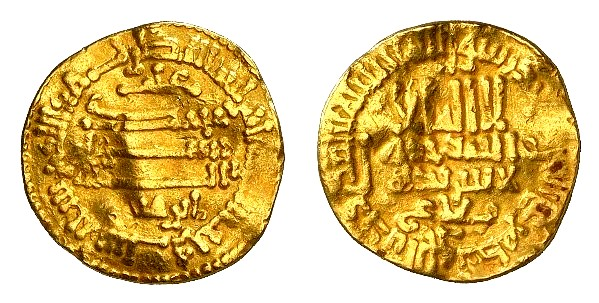
- Gold Dinar of Ibrahim II minted 286 AH (899 AD)

Emir of Ifriqiya, Sicily and Malta
- Reign: 875 – 23 October 902
- Predecessor: Muhammad II ibn Ahmad
- Successor: Abu 'l-Abbas Abdallah
- Born: 27 June 850
- Died: 23 October 902 (aged 52)
- Spouse: unknown
Names
- Abu Ishaq Ibrahim ibn Ahmad ibn Muhammad
- House: Aghlabid
- Father: Abu Ibrahim Ahmad
- Military career
- Service years: c. 875–902
- Conflicts: Arab Conquest of Sicily, Siege of Taormina

Abu Ishaq Ibrahim II ibn Ahmad (Arabic: أبو اسحاق ابراهيم الثاني) (27 June 850 – 23 October 902) was the Emir of Ifriqiya. He ruled from 875 until his abdication in 902. After the demise of his brother, Ibrahim was endorsed as emir where he took steps to improve safety in his domain and secured the development of commercial activities. He improved public works, such as building a vast reservoir, erecting walls as well as the development of mosques and his Raqqada palace.

A centralizing ruler, Ibrahim mistrusted the old Arab high aristocracy of Ifriqiya. He was involved in conflicts with the ambitious Tulunids, who after seizing Egypt (868), Syria and the Hejaz (878), decided to attack him. When Egypt fell into chaos in 896, Ibrahim led a campaign to recover his eastern borders against the Tulunids in 896–897.

Despite having a fierce reputation as an oppressor, he was an efficient and fair ruler, treating reports of mistreatment of a commoner by a noble as lèse-majesté. However, it was also reported that he took great pleasure in cruelty and killing. Ibn al-Athir and Ibn Khaldun summarized Ibrahim's emirate as seven good years, before he became unhinged by "melancholia" (malihulia). Citing mistreatment of his subjects, Abbasid Caliph al-Mu'tadid dispatched a messenger to Tunis in 901/902 where he demanded Ibrahim to Baghdad and deprived him of the governorship of Ifriqiya. Later, he began his advertised march to Baghdad by way of Europe and his plans to conquer Constantinople for Islam. He advanced through Sicily, and after laying siege to Taormina, he marched to Messina in 902 and ferried his army across the straits to Calabria. Ibrahim, however, got bogged down laying siege to Cosenza, and took ill with dysentery and died.

== Accession ==
Abu Ishaq Ibrahim was the son of the Aghlabid emir Ahmad of Ifriqiya. After his father's death in 863, the emirate of Ifriqiya passed to his father's brother Ziyadat Allah II, but he died shortly after, and the succession passed back to the main line, to Ibrahim's brother Abu 'l-Gharaniq Muhammad II.

Muhammad II was a frivolous and pleasure-loving ruler. During his brother's emirate, Ibrahim was assigned the governorship of Kairouan, an office he executed with exemplary efficiency and seriousness, which earned him much admiration. Hopes were high when the dissolute Muhammad II died prematurely in February 875. The emirate passed to Ibrahim II, his candidacy pushed forward by popular crowds and endorsed by the jurists of Kairouan, who set aside the claims of his young nephew, the son of Muhammad II.

== Raqqada and other works ==
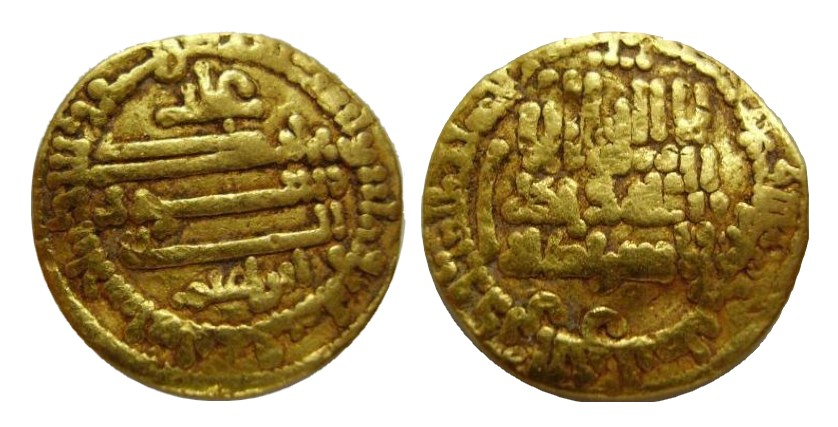
Aghlabid gold dinar during the reign of Ibrahim II.

Although Ibrahim II inherited a kingdom depopulated by the plague of 874, his reign was economically prosperous. He revived the religious police and is said to have rid the roads of banditry and secured the safety of commerce. A coinage reform he undertook in 888–889 provoked riots in Kairouan, which had to be suppressed, but it also resulted in an influx of precious metal from the eastern caliphate. He sought to develop agriculture by building up the irrigation system.

Among his public works, Ibrahim completed the Zaytuna mosque of Tunis, enlarged the Uqba mosque of Kairouan, built a vast new water reservoir for the city, erected the walls of Sousse, and established a line of new naval signal towers along the Ifriqiyan coast (it reportedly took one night to dispatch a message from Ceuta in Morocco to Alexandria in Egypt).

In 876, Ibrahim erected a new palace-city, called Raqqada ("the Somnolent"), just a few kilometres southwest of Kairouan. It replaced the nearby palace-city of al-Abbasiya used by previous Aghlabid emirs. Raqqada was built on a grandiose scale; according to al-Bakri, its walls were ten kilometers long and encompassed a land area as large as Kairouan itself. Its skyline was marked by a great tower, called the Abu al-Feth ("Father of Victory"). It had multiple palaces and barracks, influenced primarily by Umayyad designs, with vast gardens, pools and hydraulic systems. The city was divided into two roughly equal-sized districts, one dedicated to the emir alone, the other a densely packed quarter for his noble retinue, which also contained the facilities for regular urban life – a congregational mosque, souks, public baths, etc. The separation emphasized the royal majesty of the Aghlabid Emir and his independence from the aristocracy. According to al-Bakri, the Fatimid leader, Abdullah al Mahdi, upon entering the conquered city in 909, was astonished at the Aghlabid constructions, and singled out the waterworks of Tunis and the palaces of Raqqada as two things in the Maghreb that had no parallel back in the East.

== Centralization of rule ==
At the beginning of his rule, Ibrahim II was well-regarded as a just and enlightened ruler, but this eventually gave way to a more tyrannical and gruesome reputation. A centralizing ruler, Ibrahim mistrusted the old Arab high aristocracy of Ifriqiya, which had often been a thorn in the side of prior Aghlabid emirs. He held open court in Raqqada every week, after Friday prayers, when the common poor people of Ifriqiya were invited to present petitions directly to the emir. Identifying himself with the people, Ibrahim treated any report of mistreatment of a commoner by a noble as a case of lese-majesty, and handed out severe penalties to the offender, even members of his own family.

An absolutist monarch by disposition, ascetic without distractions, Ibrahim seems to have kept counsel with himself, largely immune from the influence of courtiers and bureaucrats. Only a few names appear near the top – his learned and martial son, Abu al-Abbas Abdallah, his chamberlain (hajib) Muhammad ibn Korhob and his successor Hassan ibn Nakib, and two ruthless slave-generals known as Ma'imun and Rashid. Above everybody was his mother, whom the chronicles deferentially refer to merely as the Sayyida ("Supreme Lady") and characterize as the only person whose opinion Ibrahim respected or who had any influence upon him (although he was not above embarrassing her – in a public case over a 600 dinar debt she owed two merchants, he judged against her and forced her to pay up).

Ibrahim sought to undermine the semi-autonomous Arab regiments (junds) which were the basis of the aristocracy's power, by supplanting them with loyal black African slave-soldiers ("Abid" or "Sudan") at the core of the Ifriqiyan army. At the inauguration of Raqqada in 878, Ibrahim had the palace guard of his predecessor massacred at the tower of Abu al-Feth in order to make way for his own new Sudanese guard. Ibrahim expanded the Sudanese regiments (later supplemented by white European Slavs or Saqaliba) to as much as 10,000, much to the chagrin of the Arab jund commanders. The Arab nobility resented not only being eclipsed, but also the hefty taxes and requisitions imposed by Ibrahim to maintain such a large standing army.

In 893, when the Arab jund lords of Belezma (near Batna, in western Ifriqiya) revolted against his military reforms and requisitions, Ibrahim invited them to Raqqada to present their case. The Arab lords and their retinues were received with pomp and banquets. But during the night, while they slept in the Raqqada palaces, the entire Arab party – nearly one thousand people – were set upon and massacred by Ibrahim's guard.

The massacre of the Belezma lords provoked uprisings by other Arab lords, led by the junds of Tunis. The revolts spread throughout Ifriqiya in 893–94, and for a period of time, Ibrahim was practically reduced to his capital, Raqqada. But the revolts were ruthlessly and systematically crushed, with much bloodshed, by Ibrahim's Sudanese regiments.

== Conflict with Egypt and Nafusa ==
Ibrahim II entered into a conflict with the ambitious Turkic dynasty of the Tulunids, who had seized control of Egypt in 868, and Syria and the Hejaz in 878. In 879–880, while the Tulunid emir Ahmad ibn Tulun was away in the east, his hot-headed son Abbas, without his father's permission, decided to invade Ifriqiya and led a large Egyptian army west. Upon reaching Barqa, al-Abbas dispatched a message, falsely claiming that he had credentials from the Abbasid caliph ordering Ibrahim to step down and hand the governorship of Ifriqiya over to him. The Egyptian army reached as far as Tripoli, and defeated the local Aghlabid governor Muhammad ibn Qurhub. But the Egyptian army was defeated in turn in 880 by the Nafusa, a Berber Kharijite (Ibadite) tribe, allied with the Rustamids of Tahert, which had carried on an independent existence in the Djebel Nafusa mountains southwest of Tripoli for over a century. Rushing south from Tunisia, Ibrahim II arrived just in time to seize the Tulunid baggage train and its ample war chest, which proved a fortuitous bolster to the Aghlabid treasury.

Following the assassination of the Tulunid emir Khumarawaih in 896, Egypt fell into chaos. In 896–97, Ibrahim II led an Ifriqiyan campaign to recover and secure his eastern borders against Tulunid Egypt. Some of the grimmer tales of Ibrahim II's brutality arise from this expedition. Reaching Tripoli, Ibrahim II had the governor Muhammad, his own cousin, executed and impaled (ostensibly because he heard the Abbasid Caliph al-Mu'tamid had spoken favorably of him). That same year, he attacked and defeated the Ibadite Nafusa at a great battle at Manu (south of Gabès), putting an end to their independent imamate. In the aftermath, Ibrahim II is reported to have set up a throne and ordered the Nafusa prisoners paraded before him one by one so that he could kill each prisoner himself with his lance. He is said to have personally executed 500 prisoners this way before he got tired. At Ajdabiya, on the borders of Barqa, he is reported to have cooked and eaten the heads of fifteen of his enemies.

== Homicidal reputation ==
As his emirate advanced, Ibrahim acquired a grisly reputation not only as a tyrant, but also more personally as a homicidal sadist. It is reported he took great pleasure in cruelty and killing, often conducting executions personally (as in the case of the Nafusa prisoners). Among other episodes of homicidal madness, Ibrahim is said to have ordered the execution of 300 palace servants after discovering at dinner that a napkin had been mislaid. On hearing accusations of a homosexual encounter among his bodyguards, Ibrahim personally smashed the accused's head in with a mace, and ordered a brazier to burn the others alive in his presence.

He was reportedly no more sparing of his family members. He executed eight brothers and his own son Abu al-Aghlab on a vague suspicion. He had several of his wives executed by strangulation, immurement, dismemberment and other means. He ordered the execution of every one of his daughters upon birth. When he learned that sixteen of his daughters had escaped notice and had grown to adulthood, he held a reception for them, greeted them kindly, and then had them immediately beheaded. When his mother gave him two cultured female slaves whom she hoped would please him, he sent her a note of thanks, accompanied by the girls' severed heads on a tray. Following rumors of a courtly plot to assassinate him and his mother in 900, he had all the pages of the palaces put to death.

These episodes are just a sample of the numerous gruesome stories that circulated about him – executions, abductions, rapes, tortures, conducted by him personally or on his orders.

It is impossible to determine how many of the reported stories are true, and how many were fabricated by his numerous enemies. Indeed, it is possible Ibrahim may have spread some of those tales himself, to terrify possible enemies into submission. He is often characterized as mentally deranged – chroniclers such as Ibn al-Athir and Ibn Khaldun summarize Ibrahim II's emirate as seven good years, before he became unhinged by "melancholia" (malihulia). However, as one historian notes, "the savagery of Ibrahim II seems not so much insane as intentional. His reign was a determined battle for absolutism at the expense of the nobility, the army, the cities and to a lesser extent the tribes, all the elements that threatened the survival of the monarchy." In motive and execution, Ibrahim is often compared to Ivan the Terrible of Russia.

== Sicily ==
At the time of Ibrahim's ascension in 875, most of Sicily was already in Aghlabid hands. During Ibrahim's emirate, there was little stability in the provincial government of Aghlabid Sicily; governors were appointed and switched almost yearly.

In 877, Ibrahim II's deputy in Sicily, Jafar ibn Muhammad al-Tamini, overran the Byzantine-held eastern part of the island. After a lengthy siege the important citadel of Syracuse fell in May 878, bringing the Muslim conquest of Sicily to near completion. Only Taormina, Catania and a couple of other outposts remained in Byzantine hands.

The fall of Syracuse seemed to clear the way for an Aghlabid invasion of the Italian mainland, on which the Aghlabids already had a foothold. But the Aghlabid navy, which had plied the Mediterranean practically unopposed for much of the century, soon faced its first serious disaster. In 880, a Byzantine fleet assembled by Emperor Basil I, under the command of the droungarios Nasar, trapped and destroyed the Aghlabid fleet at the naval Battle of Cephalonia off western Greece. With the sea cleared, the Byzantines went on the offensive on the south Italian mainland and captured the Muslim holdings in Apulia and Calabria, notably seizing the citadel of Taranto, which had been captured by the Aghlabids forty years earlier. Streams of Muslim refugees fled the Greek onslaught towards the western Campania coast, where they were received by Bishop-Duke Athanasius of Naples and resettled in pockets at Vesuvius, Agropoli and Garigliano, and even as far inland as Sepiano (near Bojano).

The loss of the fleet dulled any prospect of a reaction by the Aghlabids. Small fleets from Sicily would continue to support the remaining Muslim colonies on the Italian mainland, but the prospect of more concerted action was postponed.

A rising internal conflict in Sicily itself soon took up most of the attention of Ibrahim's Sicilian governors. Since the beginning of the Ifriqiyan conquest of the island in the 820s, Arab and Berber colonists had been at odds with each other. Arab colonists, concentrated in the northern part of the island, had come with the first wave of conquest and Arab lords staked out vast tracts in the center for regimental fiefs. But Berber immigration, concentrated in the south, was more numerous post-conquest. Population pressure prompted Berber colonists to begin encroaching on the Arab regimental lands, provoking internal clashes. Ibrahim II's Sicilian governors, reflecting their master's prejudices, tended to find in favor of the Berbers and against the Arab lords.

Aghlabid governors of Sicily routinely led sai'fa (religiously mandated raids for booty and prisoners) on the mainland, and the prospect of raking in war plunder abroad usually helped defuse the internal political tensions over land. But the Greek offensive in Calabria in 885–86, led by Nikephoros Phokas, threw back the raids led by Ibrahim II's governor, Sawada ibn Khafaja. With the Aghlabid army of Sicily weakened, in December 886, the Arab lords of Palermo revolted, expelled Sawada, and elected one of their own as governor. However, the uprising was short-lived, and the Aghlabid governor returned the next year.

In 888, with the Aghlabid fleet reconstituted, Ibrahim II ordered a massive raid on the coast of Calabria. The Byzantine fleet was dispatched by Emperor Leo VI to confront them, but it was destroyed by the Aghlabids in the Battle of Milazzo in September 888. The internal tensions in Sicily, however, prevented the Aghlabids from capitalizing on their recovery of naval supremacy. In March 890, the Palerman Arab nobility returned to rebellion. The Berbers of Agrigento declared themselves loyalists for Ibrahim II and took up arms against the Arabs, throwing Sicily into the throes of a civil war. In 892, Ibrahim dispatched a new governor, Muhammad ibn Fadhl, at the head of a large Aghlabid army, who managed to force his way into Palermo and briefly re-impose Ifriqiyan authority. But things descended into chaos again shortly after.

The 893–894 nobles' revolt in Ifriqiya absorbed Ibrahim's attentions, and left the Sicilians to fight it out among themselves for the next few years. A forty-month truce was negotiated with the Byzantines in 895–896. In the summer of 900, Ibrahim was finally ready. A strong Ifriqiyan expeditionary army, under his son Abu al-Abbas Abdallah, was dispatched to recover Sicily. Landing in Mazara in early August, 900, the Aghlabid force proceeded to lay siege to rebel-held Trapani.

It is reported by Ibn Khaldoun (but not other sources) that the Arabs of Palermo and the Berbers of Agrigento patched up their differences just in time to present a united Sicilian front to negotiate with the Aghlabids. Others report the two parties tried to negotiate separately with Abu al-Abbas Abdallah. In either case, the negotiations failed, and the Arabs of Palermo assembled an army, under the command of a certain Rakamuweih (an Arabized Persian) to march against the Aghlabid expeditionary force. Sicilians and Aghlabids clashed at the terrible Battle of Trapani, without a clear victor. The Sicilian Arabs retreated to Palermo, hoping to regroup and gather reinforcements there. Abu al-Abbas Abdallah gathered up his army and gave chase. In September 900, the Aghlabids caught up with and defeated the Sicilian army before Palermo. The Sicilian rebel remnant withdrew into the fortified citadel (qasr) of Palermo (the old center now known as Cassaro), leaving the town and suburbs open to the sack of the Ifriqiyan army. After about a week, on 18 September 900, the Sicilian rebels surrendered, yielding up the Qasr to Abdallah in return for safe-passage of the rebel leaders into exile. Streams of Palerman refugees made their way east to take shelter in the Byzantine holdings.

The next year (901), Abu al-Abbas Abdallah led the Aghlabid army against the remaining Byzantine enclaves in Sicily. While laying siege to Demona (in the northeast), Abu Abbas Abdallah heard rumors of the assembly of a Byzantine army in Calabria. Breaking off the siege, he rushed the Aghlabid army up to Messina, and ferried it across the straits, soon appearing before the walls of Reggio Calabria in June 901. Unprepared, the Byzantine garrison abandoned the city. The Aghlabids seized Reggio and put the wealthy city through a thorough sack.

== Abdication ==
Mounting reports of the cruel atrocities of Ibrahim II made their way to Baghdad, prompting the Abbasid Caliph al-Mu'tadid to finally react. The caliph dispatched a messenger who arrived in Tunis in late 901/early 902 with his written instructions. Citing the mistreatment of his subjects, the caliph recalled Ibrahim II to Baghdad and deprived him of the governorship of Ifriqiya, appointing in his stead his son Abu al-Abbas Abdallah (then on campaign in Sicily).

Surprisingly, Ibrahim II dutifully accepted the news without objection. With apparently genuine repentance, donning the garments of a penitent and declaring a pious change of heart, Ibrahim II remitted tributes, abolished illegal taxes, opened his jails, manumitted his slaves, and delivered a large chunk of his treasury to the jurists of Kairouan to distribute to the needy. Ibrahim II abdicated his power to his son Abu al-Abbas Abdallah, who returned from Sicily in February–March 902 to assume title as the new emir Abdallah II of Ifriqiya.

== Final campaign ==
The deposed Ibrahim, however, did not go to Baghdad, as ordered. Instead, he declared himself a mujahid, that he would seek to expiate his crimes by pursuing holy war on the Christians. Ibrahim proceeded to Sousse, and raised a large army of volunteers, which he promised to march across Europe and conquer Constantinople for Islam (in a letter to the Abbasid caliph, Ibrahim assured he was obeying orders and that he was simply taking a long, circuitous route to Baghdad).

In May 902, the army set out for Sicily, landing in Trapani, and proceeded to Palermo, where he raised even more volunteers. Ibrahim II directed his army against Taormina, the last great citadel still in Byzantine hands. He crushed the recently reinforced Byzantine army that came out to meet him at Giardini. Taormina itself, sitting upon a rock, seemed impregnable. Ibrahim nonetheless ordered volunteers to climb the rocky seaward face of the citadel, which the remaining defenders had neglected to watch. Once the black flag of the caliphate was unfurled at the top, Ibrahim's army surged towards the gates. The defenders were overwhelmed, the gates flung open and Taormina fell on 1 August 902.

With the fall of Taormina, after 75 years, all of Sicily was finally in Muslim hands. A few scattered Byzantine outposts remained, but they either surrendered immediately afterwards, or were of little consequence.

In September 902, after dismantling defenses and accepting surrenders, the ex-emir marched to Messina and ferried his army across the straits to Calabria, to begin his advertised march overland to Constantinople. News of the landing of a large Ifriqiyan army headed by the ferocious Ibrahim (his bloodthirsty reputation preceded him) prompted a panic in southern Italy, several towns began evacuations, fortresses were demolished lest the Ifriqiyans made use of them. Ibrahim, however, got bogged down laying siege to Cosenza, a small citadel in northern Calabria that should not have been much of an obstacle. Taken suddenly ill with dysentery, the ex-emir Ibrahim II died on 23 October 902 in a chapel near the siege camp of Cosenza. Command of the expeditionary army passed to his grandson, Ziyadat Allah, who immediately lifted the siege and returned with the army to Sicily.

The remains of Ibrahim II were buried either in Palermo or Kairouan. If the grave had a marker, it disappeared soon after.

== Aftermath ==
Ibrahim II's reign proved to be the beginning of the end of Aghlabid emirate. There was probably little he could have done to prevent the loss of the Aghlabid toehold on the Italian mainland. Although the conquest of Sicily had been completed under him – Syracuse in 878, Taormina in 902 – Ibrahim II's erratic and heavy-handed rule had provoked civil war and separatism among the island's Muslim communities.

Perhaps of greater consequence was Ibrahim II's murderous destruction of the Arab aristocracy. It left the Ifriqiyan regiments broken at the top and demoralized. Shortly after the departure of the bulk of the Ifriqiyan army for Ibrahim's last mad campaign in Italy in 902, the Kutama, a Berber tribe of the Petite Kabylie, fired up and organized by the Ismaili preacher Abu 'Abdullah al-Shi'i, burst out of their highland strongholds and began capturing the Aghlabid fortresses that had hitherto kept them contained. The crippled junds proved hardly an obstacle, and the Kutama would end up capturing all of Ifriqiya by 909 with relative ease, bringing the Aghlabid dynasty to an end, and inaugurating the Fatimid dynasty.

The reputation of Ibrahim II's feared Sudanese regiments was such that, during the campaigns of 902–909, the Fatimids mercilessly executed any black African who fell into their hands.

== Sources ==
- Abu Nasr, J.M. (1987) A History of the Maghrib in the Islamic period. Cambridge, UK, Cambridge University Press.
- Amari, M. (1854–58) Storia dei Musulmani di Sicilia. 2 volumes, Florence: Felice Le Monnier. v.1, v.2
- Bianquis, Thierry (1998). "Autonomous Egypt from Ibn Ṭūlūn to Kāfūr, 868–969". In Petry, Carl F. (ed.). The Cambridge History of Egypt: Islamic Egypt, 640–1517. Vol. 1. Cambridge: Cambridge University Press. pp. 86–119. ISBN 0-521-47137-0.
- Bloom, J.M. (2000) "Walled Cities in Islamic North Africa and Egypt", in J.D. Tracy, editor, City Walls: the urban enceinte in global perspective. Cambridge, UK: Cambridge University Press.
- Brett, M. (1978) "The Fatimid Revolution (861–973) and its aftermath in North Africa", The Cambridge History of Africa: Volume 2, c.500 B.C.-A.D. 1050. Cambridge: Cambridge University Press. pp. 589–633
- Brett, M. (2001) The Rise of the Fatimids: The world of the Mediterranean and the Middle East in the Fourth Century of the Hijra, Tenth Century CE. Leiden: Brill.
- Julien, C.A. (1931) Histoire de l'Afrique du Nord, vol. 2 – De la conquête arabe à 1830, 1961 edition, Paris: Payot.
- Metcalfe, Alex (2009). The Muslims of Medieval Italy. Edinburgh: Edinburgh University Press. ISBN 978-0-7486-2008-1.
- Naylor, P.C. (2009) North Africa: A history from antiquity to the present.. Austin: University of Texas Press.
- al-Nuwayri, biographical entry on Abu Ishaq Ibrahim, French transl: De la Slane (1852) Histoire des Berbères et des dynasties musulmanes de l'Afrique Septentrionale, vol. 1, App. 2, pp.424-40; Italian transl.: Amari (1851) Nuova raccolta di scritture e documenti intorno alla dominazione degli arabi in Sicilia, pp.117-133
- Osborn, R.D. (1876) Islam under the Arabs. London: Longmans, Green & Co. online
- Talbi, M. (1966) L'Emirat Aghlabide, 184–296 (800–909): Histoire politique. Paris: Maisonneuve.
- Walker, P.E. (1998). "The Isma'ili Da'wa and the Fatimid Caliphate"". In Petry, Carl F. (ed.). The Cambridge History of Egypt: Islamic Egypt, 640–1517. Vol. 1. Cambridge: Cambridge University Press. pp. 120–150. ISBN 0-521-47137-0.
- History Abridged (18 February 2021). "Why everyone in 900 AD was Scared of Tunisia - The Life & Times of Ibrahim II". YouTube.

Ibrahim II of Ifriqiya Aghlabid
Preceded by Muhammad II	Emir of Ifriqiya; 875–902	Succeeded by Abdallah II
