= Constantine Kontomytes =

9th-century Byzantine general and noble

- Military career
- Allegiance: Byzantine Empire
- Rank: strategos of the Thracesians and of Sicily

Constantine Kontomytes or Contomytes (Greek: Κωνσταντῖνος ὁ Κοντομύτης, fl. 841–860) was a Byzantine general and nobleman.

== Biography ==
As the governor (strategos) of the Thracesian Theme, Constantine Kontomytes inflicted a severe defeat on the Cretan Saracens in 841, when they raided the rich monastic community of Mount Latros. Shortly before or soon after, Constantine's daughter married the magistros Bardas, who was the nephew of Empress Theodora on his mother's side and of Patriarch Photios on his father's. Bardas later assumed his father-in-law's surname.

In 859, Emperor Michael III (r. 842–867) sent him to Sicily at the head of 300 ships, to confront the Arabs on the island. The Byzantine army suffered a major defeat by the Arabs under Abbas ibn Fadhl, however, and were forced back onto their ships.

== Sources ==
- Treadgold, Warren (1988). The Byzantine Revival, 780–842. Stanford, California: Stanford University Press. ISBN 978-0-8047-1462-4.
- Winkelmann, Friedhelm; Lilie, Ralph-Johannes; Ludwig, Claudia; Pratsch, Thomas; Rochow, Ilse (1999). "Bardas (#793)". Prosopographie der mittelbyzantinischen Zeit: I. Abteilung (641–867), 1. Band: Aaron (#1) – Georgios (#2182) (in German). Berlin, Germany and New York, New York: Walter de Gruyter. pp. 267–268. ISBN 978-3-11-015179-4.
- Winkelmann, Friedhelm; Lilie, Ralph-Johannes; Ludwig, Claudia; Pratsch, Thomas; Rochow, Ilse (2000). "Konstantinos Kontomytes (#3929)". Prosopographie der mittelbyzantinischen Zeit: I. Abteilung (641–867), 2. Band: Georgios (#2183) – Leon (#4270) (in German). Berlin, Germany and New York, New York: Walter de Gruyter. pp. 567–568. ISBN 978-3-11-016672-9.
