= Al-Abbas ibn al-Fadl ibn Ya'qub al-Fazari =

Al-Abbas ibn Al-Fadl al-Fazari العباس بن الفضل الفزاري
- Emir of Sicily (851 – 14 August 861)
- Predecessor: Ibrahim ibn Allah
- Successor: Ahmed ibn Ya'qùb al-Fazari
- Died: 14 August 861
- Children: Abdullah
Names
- Abu 'l-Aghlâb al Abbâs ibn al-Fadl ibn Ya'qùb al-Fazari
- Father: Al-Fadl ibn Yaq'ub al-Fazari
- Religion: Sunni Islam

Abu 'l-Aghlâb al Abbâs ibn al-Fadl ibn Ya'qùb al-Fazari (died 14 August 861) was Emir of Palermo from 851 to 861. He belonged to the Aghlabid dynasty ruling Kairouan and descended from the Fazara tribe. Before taking power he was the protagonist of the battle of Butera in 845. During his emirate, characterized by intense military activity, the Arabs were able to take Enna after a long siege that ended on January 24, 859.
