= Muslim conquest of Sicily =

827–902 Aghlabid campaign against the Byzantines

- Part of the Arab–Byzantine wars and Early Muslim conquests
- Italy in 1000. The Emirate of Sicily is in light green.
Date	June 827 – August 902
Location	Sicily
Result	Aghlabid–Abbasid victory
Territorial changes	Aghlabid conquest of Sicily and parts of southern Italy

Belligerents
Aghlabid Emirate; Abbasid Caliphate; Supported by: Emirate of Cordoba; Duchy of Naples	Byzantine Empire; Supported by: Venice

Commanders and leaders
Euphemius †; Asad ibn al-Furat; Al-Abbas ibn al-Fadl ibn Ya'qub al-Fazari; Abu'l-Abbas Abdallah (II); Ibrahim II	Balata; Giustiniano Participazio; Theodotus †; Alexios Mousele; Constantine Kontomytes

The Muslim Aghlabids conquered Sicily between June 827 and 902, when the last major Byzantine stronghold on the island, Taormina, fell. Isolated fortresses remained in Byzantine hands until 965, but the island was henceforth under Arab Muslim rule until it was conquered in turn by the Normans in the late 11th century.

Although Sicily had been raided by the Muslim Arabs since the mid-7th century, these raids did not threaten Byzantine control over the island, which remained a largely peaceful backwater. The opportunity for the Aghlabid emirs of Ifriqiya (present-day Tunisia) came in 827, when the commander of the island's fleet, Euphemius, rose in revolt against the Byzantine emperor Michael II. Defeated by loyalist forces and driven from the island, Euphemius sought the aid of the Aghlabids, an Arab dynasty. The latter regarded this as an opportunity for expansion and for diverting the energies of their own fractious military establishment and alleviating the criticism of the Islamic scholars by championing jihad, and dispatched an army to aid him. Following the Arab landing on the island, Euphemius was quickly sidelined. An initial assault on the island's capital, Syracuse, failed, but the Muslims were able to weather the subsequent Byzantine counter-attack and hold on to a few fortresses. With the aid of reinforcements from Ifriqiya and Umayyad al-Andalus, in 831 they took Palermo, which became the capital of the new Arab-Muslim province.

The Byzantine government sent a few expeditions to aid the locals against the Muslims, but preoccupied with the struggle against the Abbasids on their eastern frontier and with the Emirate of Crete in the Aegean Sea, it was unable to mount a sustained effort to drive back the Muslims, who over the next three decades raided Byzantine possessions almost unopposed. The strong fortress of Enna in the centre of the island was the main Byzantine bulwark against Muslim expansion, until its capture in 859. Following its fall, the Muslims increased their pressure against the eastern parts of the island, and, after a long siege, captured Syracuse in 878. The Byzantines retained control of some fortresses in the north-eastern corner of the island for some decades thereafter, and launched a number of efforts to recover the island until well into the 11th century, but were unable to seriously challenge Muslim control over Sicily. The fall of the last major Byzantine fortress, Taormina, in 902, is held to mark the completion of the Muslim conquest of Sicily.

Under Arab rule, Sicily prospered and eventually detached itself from Ifriqiya to form a semi-independent emirate. The island's Muslim community survived the Norman conquest in the late 11th century and even prospered under the Norman kings, giving birth to the unique Norman–Arab–Byzantine culture until the Muslim expulsion to Lucera in the 1220s after a failed uprising.

== Background ==
Throughout the imperial Roman period, Sicily was a quiet, prosperous backwater. Only in the 5th century did it suffer from raids by the Vandals operating from the coasts of Vandalic Africa. In 535, the island came under Byzantine control and was raided by the Ostrogoths in the Gothic War, but calm returned thereafter. Protected by the sea, the island was spared the ravages inflicted on Byzantine Italy through the Lombard invasions of the late 6th and early 7th centuries, and retained a still flourishing urban life and a civilian administration. It was only the increasing threat of the Muslim expansion that thrust it into the limelight. As John Bagnell Bury writes, "A fruitful land and a desirable possession in itself, Sicily's central position between the two basins of the Mediterranean rendered it an object of supreme importance to any Eastern sea-power which was commercially or politically aggressive; while for an ambitious ruler in Africa it was the steppingstone to Italy and the gates of the Adriatic."

Consequently, the island was early on targeted by the Muslims, the first raid occurring in 652, only a few years after the establishment of the first Muslim navy. Following the onset of Muslim attacks against North Africa, it became a crucial strategic base, and for a while, in 661–668, it was the residence of the imperial court under Constans II. Constituted as a theme around 690, its governing strategos also came to assume control over the scattered imperial possessions in the southern Italian mainland. The island was raided thereafter, especially in the first half of the 8th century, but did not come under serious threat until the Muslims completed their conquest of North Africa and moved into Hispania as well.

It was Abd al-Rahman al-Fihri, the Arab Abbasid governor of Ifriqiya, who first made plans to invade the island in force and attempt to capture it and Sardinia in 752–753, but he was thwarted by a Berber rebellion. In 799, the founder of the Aghlabid dynasty, Ibrahim ibn al-Aghlab, secured recognition of his position as autonomous emir of Ifriqiya by the Abbasid caliph, Harun al-Rashid, thereby marking the establishment of a practically independent state centred on modern Tunisia. In 805, Ibrahim concluded a ten-year truce with the Byzantine governor of Sicily, which was renewed by Ibrahim's son and successor Abdallah I in 813. During this time, the Aghlabids were too preoccupied with their rivalry with the Idrisids, Arab dynasty, to the west to plan any serious assault on Sicily. Instead, there are testimonies of commercial traffic between Sicily and Ifriqiya, and of the presence of Arab traders on the island.

== Euphemius' rebellion ==
Map of Europe and the Mediterranean in the early ninth century

The occasion for the invasion of Sicily was provided by the rebellion of the tourmarches Euphemius, commander of the island's fleet. According to later and possibly fictional accounts, driven by lust for a nun, he had forced her to marry him. Her brothers protested to Emperor Michael II, and the Byzantine ruler ordered the island's strategos, Constantine Soudas, to investigate the matter and if the charges were found true, to cut off Euphemius' nose as punishment. Thus it came that Euphemius, returning from a naval raid against the African coast, learned that he was to be arrested. Instead, he sailed for Syracuse, occupying the city, while the governor sought refuge in the interior. Euphemius soon managed to gain the support of a large part of the island's military leadership. Euphemius repulsed an attempt by Constantine to recover Syracuse, forcing the governor to flee to Catana. Euphemius' forces pursued and drove Constantine out of Catana, and eventually captured and executed him. Euphemius was then proclaimed emperor. The historian Alexander Vasiliev doubts the "romantic" story of the origin of Euphemius' revolt, and believes that the ambitious general simply used an opportune moment, when the central Byzantine government was weakened by the recent Revolt of Thomas the Slav, and by its preoccupation with the contemporary Muslim conquest of Crete, to seize power for himself.

At this point, however, Euphemius was deserted by one of his closest and most powerful allies, a man known through Arab sources as "Balata" (according to Vasiliev probably a corruption of his title, while Treadgold holds that he was named Plato), and his cousin Michael, commander of Palermo. The two men denounced Euphemius' usurpation of the imperial title and marched against Syracuse, defeated Euphemius and took the city.

Like one of his predecessors, Elpidius, who had rebelled under Irene of Athens, Euphemius resolved to seek refuge among the Empire's enemies and with a few supporters sailed to Ifriqiya. There he sent a delegation to the Aghlabid court, which pleaded with the Aghlabid emir Ziyadat Allah for an army to help Euphemius conquer Sicily, after which he would pay the Aghlabids an annual tribute. This offer came as a great opportunity for the Aghlabids, who faced long-simmering ethnic tensions between Arab settlers and Berbers, dissension and rebellions within the Arab ruling elite (the jund), and criticism for their preoccupation with worldly concerns, their "un-Islamic" system of taxation and their luxurious lifestyle from the jurists of the Malikite school. Indeed, at the time of Euphemius' arrival, Ziyadat Allah had just suppressed a dangerous three-year revolt of the jund under Mansur al-Tunbudhi. As Alex Metcalfe writes, "by undertaking a jihad to expand the frontiers of Islam at the expense of the infidels by conquest – the first major undertaking since the invasion of the Iberian Peninsula from 711 – they could silence the criticism of the jurists. At the same time, they could redirect the destructive energies of a restless jund across the Ifriqiyan–Sicilian channel to secure new sources of manpower and wealth".

Ziyadat Allah's council was divided over the issue, but in the end the exhortations of the respected qadi of Kairouan, Asad ibn al-Furat, who used quotations from the Quran to support his case, swayed them. Asad was placed at the head of the expedition even while retaining his office of qadi, normally incompatible with a military post. The Muslim expeditionary forces are said to have consisted of ten thousand foot soldiers and seven hundred cavalry, mostly Ifriqiyan Arabs and Berbers, but possibly also some Khurasanis. The fleet comprised seventy or a hundred ships, to which were added Euphemius' own vessels.

== Initial operations and conquest of Palermo ==
=== Muslim landing and siege of Syracuse, 827–828 ===
On 14 June 827, the allied fleets sailed from the Bay of Sousse, and after three days they reached Mazara in southwestern Sicily, where they landed. There they were met with soldiers loyal to Euphemius, but the alliance soon began to show rifts: a Muslim detachment mistook some of Euphemius' partisans for loyalist troops, and a skirmish ensued. Although Euphemius' troops were ordered to place a twig on their helmets as a distinctive mark, Asad announced his intention to wage the campaign without them. Soon after that, Balata, who seems to have taken over the functions, if not the title, of the imperial strategos on the island, appeared nearby with a Byzantine force. The two armies clashed on a plain south-east of Mazara, where Asad's men, after exhortations by their leader, gained a victory. Balata retreated first to Enna and from there to Calabria on the Italian mainland, where he may have hoped to gather more troops. Instead, he died there shortly after his arrival.

Asad then left Mazara under Abu Zaki al-Kinani, and turned to Syracuse: the Muslim army advanced along the southern shore towards the island's capital, but at Qalat al-Qurrat (possibly ancient Acrae), it was met by an embassy from the city which offered tribute if the Muslims halted their advance. The proposal was probably designed to buy time for the city to better prepare itself for a siege, but Asad, either persuaded by the emissaries' assurances or needing to rest his army, halted his advance for a few days. At the same time, Euphemius began to regret his alliance with the Aghlabids, and opened secret contacts with the imperials, urging them to resist the Arabs. The Muslims recommenced their advance soon after, and laid siege to the city. Byzantium, which at the same time was forced to face a threat much closer to home at Crete, was unable to send much aid to the beleaguered island, while the Muslims received reinforcements from Africa. Giustiniano Participazio, the dux of the imperial protectorate of Venice, came to the city's aid, but was not able to raise the siege. The besiegers however suffered from lack of supplies as well as the outbreak of a disease in spring 828, which cost Asad his life. He was replaced by Muhammad ibn Abu'l-Jawari. When a Byzantine fleet arrived, the Arabs raised the siege and tried to sail back to Africa, but were hindered by the Byzantine ships. Thwarted, the Muslim army burned its ships and retreated over land to the castle of Mineo, which surrendered to them after three days.

=== First siege of Enna and the Byzantine counterattack, 828–829 ===
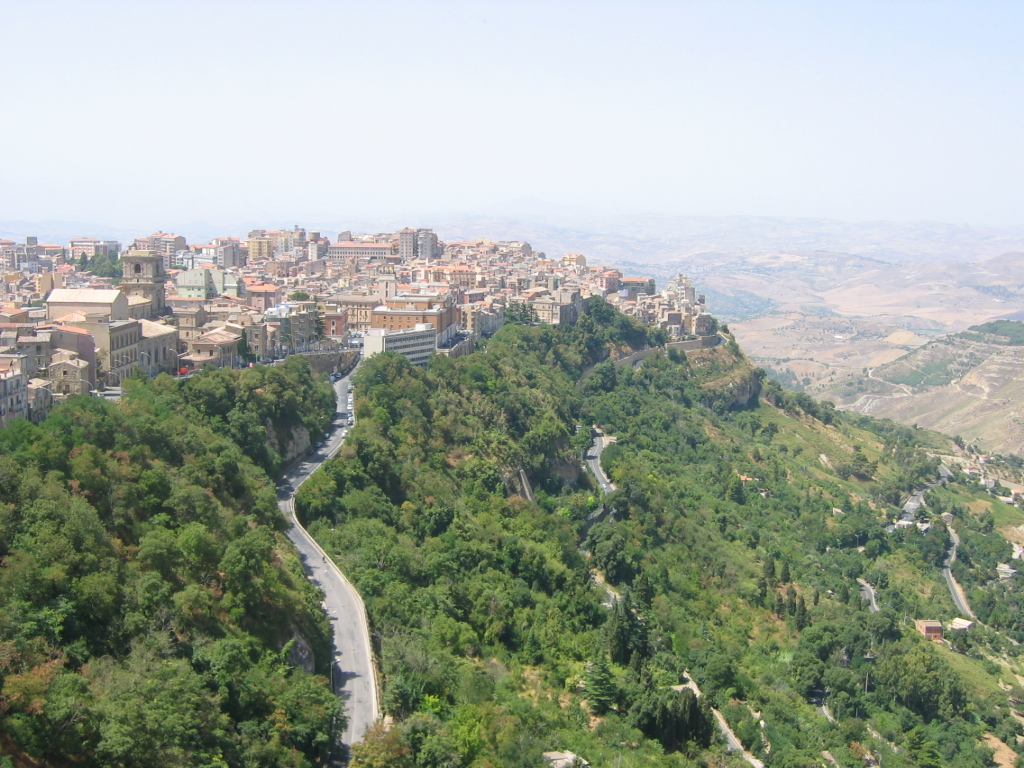
View of Enna (Castrogiovanni)

Despite his contacts with the imperials, Euphemius was now willing to serve as their guide, evidently hoping that the Muslims, humbled by their failure and without the strong will of Asad to guide them, could now be made to serve his purposes. After Mineo surrendered, the Muslim army divided in two: one part took Agrigento in the west, while the other, along with Euphemius, attacked Enna. The garrison of Enna began negotiations, offering to acknowledge Euphemius' authority, but when Euphemius with a small escort met with their emissaries, he was murdered. It is unknown what happened to Euphemius' supporters after his death, whether they dispersed or continued fighting alongside the Muslims.

In spring 829, Michael II sent a new fleet to Sicily under Theodotus, who was well acquainted with the island, having already served as its strategos in the past. After landing, Theodotus marched his army to Enna, where the Arabs were continuing the siege. He was defeated in the subsequent battle, but was able to find refuge in the fortress with most of his men. The Muslims now became so confident of victory that they struck their first coins on the island, in the name of Ziyadat Allah and Muhammad ibn Abu'l-Jawari, who however died a short while after and was replaced by Zubayr ibn Gawth. Shortly after that, Theodotus managed to reverse the situation: he led a sally that routed a Muslim raiding party and then defeated the main Muslim army on the next day, killing 1,000 men and pursuing the rest up to the Muslims' fortified encampment, which he placed under siege. The Muslims tried to break out in a night sortie, but Theodotus was expecting such a move and routed them in an ambush.

The remains of the Muslim army once again sought refuge in Mineo, where Theodotus blockaded them and soon reduced them to the point of eating their horses and even dogs. When they heard of this reversal, the Arab garrison of Agrigento abandoned the city and retreated to Mazara. Thus, by the autumn of 829, Sicily had almost been cleared of the Muslim invaders.

=== Umayyad assistance and the death of Theodotus, 830 ===
Theodotus' success was not to be completed, however: in early summer 830, a fleet from the Umayyad Emirate of Córdoba in al-Andalus, under the Berber Asbagh ibn Wakil (nicknamed Farghalush) from the Hawwara tribe, arrived in Sicily. Theodotus did not confront them, hoping that they would depart after raiding, but the beleaguered garrison at Mineo managed to get into contact with the raiders and proposed joint action. The Andalusians agreed, provided that Asbagh was recognized as the overall commander, and together with fresh troops from Ifriqiya marched on Mineo. Unable to confront them, Theodotus retreated to Enna and the siege of Mineo was broken (July or August 830). The combined Ifriqiyan and Andalusian army then torched Mineo and laid siege to another town, possibly Calloniana (modern Barrafranca). However, once again a plague broke out in their camp, killing Asbagh and many others. The town fell later, in autumn, but the Arabs' numbers were so depleted that they had to abandon it and retreat west. Theodotus launched a pursuit and inflicted heavy casualties, so that most of the Andalusians departed the island. However, Theodotus too was killed at this time, possibly in one of these skirmishes.

=== Fall of Palermo, 831 ===
Meanwhile, the Ifriqiyans of Mazara, together with some of the Andalusians, had advanced across the island and laid siege to Palermo. The city held out for a year until September 831, when its commander, the spatharios Symeon, surrendered it in exchange for safe departure for the city's senior officials and possibly the garrison as well. The city suffered greatly during the siege; the Arab historian Ibn al-Athir, records—probably with some exaggeration—that the city's population fell from 70,000 to 3,000, who were taken as slaves. The city's bishop, Luke, managed to escape and reach Constantinople, where he informed Emperor Theophilos of the disaster. The fall of Palermo marks a decisive step in the Muslim conquest of Sicily: the Muslims gained not only an important military base, but possession of the city—henceforth known simply as al-Madina ("the City")—allowed them to consolidate their control over the western portion of the island, which was established as a regular Aghlabid province. Thus, in March 832, the first Aghlabid governor (wali), Abu Fihr Muhammad ibn Abdallah, arrived in Palermo. Abu Fihr was a capable man, and was able to assuage the often violent dissensions between Ifriqiyans and Andalusians.

== Expansion of the Muslim province ==
The western third of Sicily (Val di Mazara) fell relatively quickly into Muslim hands, but conquest of the eastern portion of the island was a protracted and haphazard affair. There is little evidence of large-scale campaigns or pitched battles, and warfare was dominated by repeated Arab attacks on Byzantine citadels, coupled with raids (sa'ifa) in the surrounding countryside, aimed at looting or the extraction of tribute and prisoners from the threatened localities. In this type of warfare, the south-eastern third of the island (Val di Noto) suffered comparatively more than the more mountainous and inaccessible north-eastern portion (Val Demone).

=== Expeditions of 832–836 ===
No operations are reported in Sicily for the first two years after the fall of Palermo. The Muslims were probably preoccupied with organizing their new province, while the Byzantines were too weak to react, and could not expect any reinforcements: the Empire faced mounting pressure in the East, where the Abbasid caliph al-Ma'mun launched repeated invasions of the Byzantine borderlands and threatened to march on Constantinople itself until his sudden death in August 833.

The struggle during the next few years focused on Enna, which became the main Byzantine stronghold in central Sicily. In early 834, Abu Fihr campaigned against Enna, defeated its garrison in the field and forced it to withdraw within the town's fortifications. In spring, the garrison sallied forth, but was again defeated and driven back. In 835, Abu Fihr again raided central Sicily, and defeated the army under a Byzantine patrikios (probably the island's strategos) that opposed him, taking the Byzantine commander's wife and son captive in the process. After his success, Abu Fihr sent Muhammad ibn Salim in a raid against the eastern parts of the island, which reached as far as Taormina. However, dissensions broke out once again among the Muslims: Abu Fihr was murdered, and his killers found refuge among the Byzantines.

The Aghlabids replaced Abu Fihr with al-Fadl ibn Yaqub, who displayed great energy: immediately after his arrival he led a raid against the environs of Syracuse, and then another into central Sicily, around Enna. The Byzantine strategos marched out to meet them, but the Muslims withdrew to a mountainous and thickly forested area where the Byzantines could not pursue. After waiting in vain for the Muslims to accept battle, the strategos turned his army back, but was ambushed by the Muslims who put his men to flight. The Muslims seized most of the Byzantines' arms, equipment and animals, and almost managed to capture the severely wounded strategos himself. Despite his success, Ibn Yaqub was replaced in September by a new governor, the Aghlabid prince Abu'l-Aghlab Ibrahim ibn Abdallah ibn al-Aghlab, a first cousin of the emir Ziyadat Allah. At the same time, the long-awaited Byzantine reinforcements arrived. The Byzantine fleet contested the passage of Abu'l-Aghlab's small fleet, which lost ships both to the Byzantine attack and to storms; the Byzantines however could not prevent it from reaching Palermo, and were driven off by a squadron from the city under Muhammad ibn al-Sindi. Abu'l-Aghlab avenged himself by launching naval raids against Pantelleria and other localities, beheading the Christians taken prisoner. At the same time, a Muslim cavalry raid reached the eastern parts of the island around Mount Etna, burning the villages and crops and taking captives.

In 836, Abu'l-Aghlab launched fresh attacks. A Muslim force seized the fortress known in Arabic as Qastaliasali (probably Castelluccio on the island's northern coast), but were driven away by a Byzantine counter-attack. The Muslim fleet, under al-Fadl ibn Yaqub, raided the Aeolian Islands and seized a number of forts on the northern coast of Sicily, most notably Tyndaris. In the meantime, another cavalry raid was dispatched against the region of Etna and was so successful that the price for Byzantine captives plummeted.

=== Expeditions of 837–841 ===
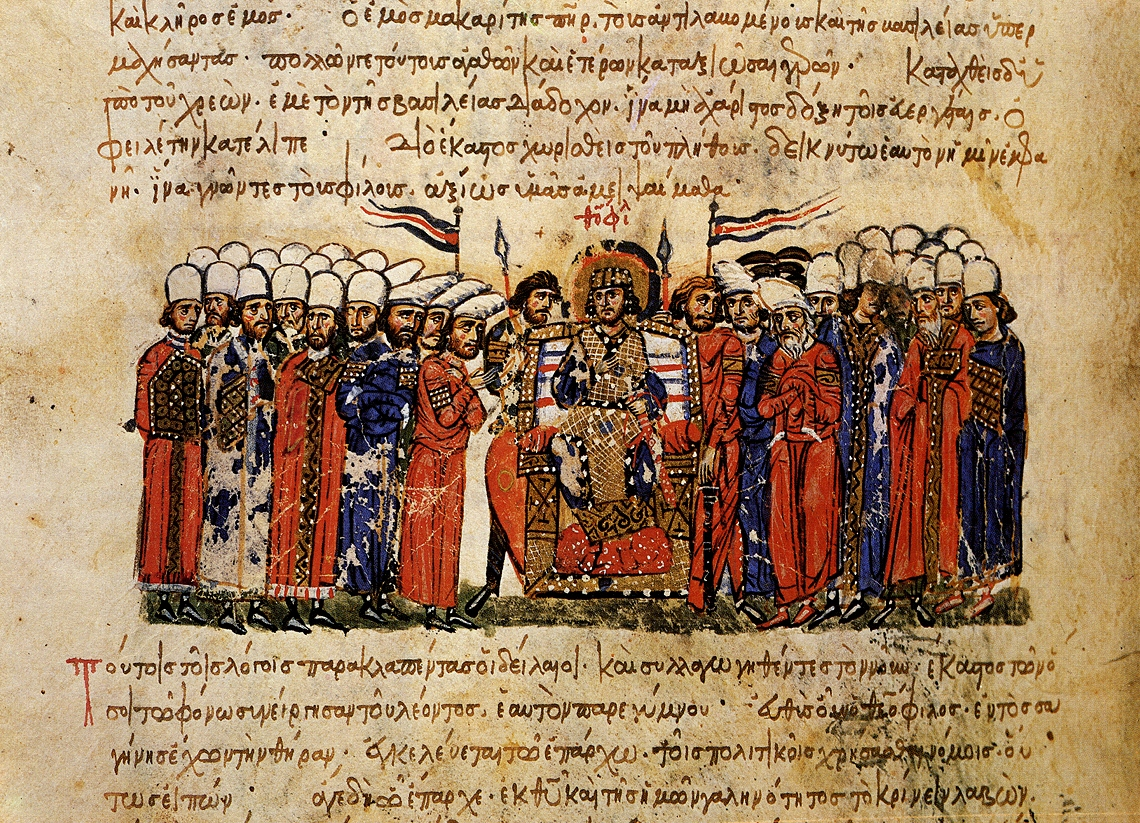
Emperor Theophilos and his court, from the Madrid Skylitzes

In 837, a Muslim army under Abd al-Salam ibn Abd al-Wahhab attacked Enna, but was defeated by the Byzantines, and Abd al-Salam himself was taken prisoner. The Muslims responded by reinforcing their position around Enna, which they placed under siege. During the following winter, one of the besiegers discovered an unguarded path leading to the town, allowing the Muslims to take the entire lower town. The Byzantines however managed to maintain control of the citadel, and, after negotiations, secured a Muslim withdrawal in exchange for a large ransom.

Theophilos now undertook a serious effort to relieve Sicily: he assembled a large army and placed it under the command of his son-in-law, the Caesar Alexios Mousele. Mousele arrived in Sicily in spring 838, in time to relieve the fortress of Cefalù from a Muslim attack. Mousele scored a number of successes against Muslim raiding parties but, back in Constantinople, his enemies launched accusations of contacts with the Arabs and designs on the throne. Furthermore, the death of his infant wife, Maria, cut his link to Theophilos, and the Emperor sent the archbishop of Syracuse, Theodore Krithinos, to recall the Caesar to Constantinople in 839.

On 11 June 838 the emir Ziyadat Allah died, and was succeeded by his brother, Abu Iqal al-Aghlab. The new emir sent fresh troops to Sicily, where the Muslims regained the upper hand after Mousele's departure: in 839–840, the Muslims captured the fortresses of Corleone, Platani, Caltabellotta, and possibly also Marineo, Geraci and other forts, and in 841, they raided from Enna as far as Grotte.

In the same period, the Sicilian Muslims also established footholds in the Italian mainland. The Muslims were asked to assist the beleaguered Duchy of Naples against Sicard of Benevento in 839, but then they sacked Brindisi and, following Sicard's murder and the outbreak of civil war in the Principality of Benevento, seized Tarentum in 840 and Bari in 847, which they made their bases. Until well into the 880s, the Muslims would launch destructive raids along the coasts of Italy and into the Adriatic Sea from their bases on the Italian mainland – most notably from the Emirate of Bari, until its destruction in 871.

=== Muslim advances and the fall of Enna, 842–859 ===
In late 842 or 843, with Neapolitan support, the Muslims conquered Messina. In 845, the fortress of Modica also fell, while the Byzantines, now at peace with the Abbasid Caliphate, received reinforcements from the eastern theme of Charsianon. The two armies met near Butera, where the Byzantines suffered a crushing defeat, losing about 10,000 men. In the wake of this disaster, the Byzantine position deteriorated rapidly: al-Fadl ibn Ja'far took Leontini by a ruse in 846, and the fortress of Ragusa followed in 848, when its garrison was forced by severe famine to surrender to the Muslims, who razed the fortress. At about the same time (late 847 or 848), an attempt by the Byzantine fleet to land troops near Palermo failed, and subsequently the Byzantines lost seven out of their ten ships in a storm.

In 851, the capable Muslim governor and general Abu'l-Aghlab Ibrahim died, and the local Muslims elected Abu'l-Aghlab al-Abbas ibn al-Fadl, the victor of Butera, as his successor. Without waiting for confirmation of his appointment from Ifriqiya, the new governor attacked and captured the northern fortress of Caltavuturo, and then turned south towards Enna, whose Byzantine commander refused to meet him in the field. Abbas continued his raid, and in 852–853 he devastated the Val di Noto. Butera was besieged for five or six months, until its inhabitants came to terms and secured his withdrawal by delivering 5,000–6,000 prisoners. Few details are known about the events of the next four years, but the picture painted by the sources is one of unopposed Muslim raids across the remaining Byzantine territories. Abbas captured several fortresses, including Cefalù in 857, the population of which was allowed safe departure before the fortress was razed. Gagliano was also besieged, but not taken. In summer 858, the two sides were engaged in naval combat, probably off Apulia; Abbas' brother Ali managed to defeat the Byzantine fleet of 40 ships in the first engagement, but was in turn defeated and forced to flee in the second.

Then, in January 859, the Muslims scored a major success through the capture, with the aid of a Byzantine prisoner, of the hitherto impregnable Enna. As Metcalfe remarks, the capture of the fortress was of major importance, for Enna was the key to Muslim expansion in eastern Sicily: "without bringing it under their control, the Muslims were not able to capture and consolidate towns further to the east without the risk of losing their gains in counteroffensives. ... Its fall, followed by its comprehensive sacking and the slaughter of its defenders on 24 January was thus, in military terms, the crowning achievement of the early Aghlabids in Sicily since the fall of Palermo".

The fall of Enna reduced the Byzantines to the eastern coastal strip between Syracuse and Taormina, and forced the emperor to send a large army and a fleet reported at 300 ships under Constantine Kontomytes, which arrived at Syracuse in autumn 859. Soon after, the Byzantine navy was defeated in a major battle with the Muslims, in which the Byzantines lost a third of their fleet. Nevertheless, the arrival of a large Byzantine army induced several settlements, which had previously submitted to the Muslims, to rise in revolt. Abbas soon suppressed these uprisings and marched against Kontomytes. The two armies met near Cefalù, and, in the ensuing battle, the Byzantines were heavily defeated and retired to Syracuse, while Abbas strengthened his position by refortifying and colonizing Enna.

== Fall of Malta and Syracuse ==
=== Governorship of Khafaja ibn Sufyan, 861–869 ===
Abbas died in autumn 861, after another raid into Byzantine territory, and was buried at Caltagirone; the Byzantines later exhumed and burned his corpse. As his replacement, the Sicilian Muslims chose his uncle Ahmad ibn Ya'qub. His tenure was short, as in February 862 he was deposed in favour of Abdallah, son of Abbas. Abdallah's general Rabah was able to capture a few Byzantine fortresses, despite suffering a defeat in battle at first. Abdallah's elevation, however, was not acknowledged by the Aghlabids, and he was replaced, after only five months in office, by Khafaja ibn Sufyan.

In 863, Khafaja sent his son Muhammad to raid the environs of Syracuse, but he was defeated by the Byzantines and forced to retire. In February/March 864, however, with the aid of a Byzantine renegade, the Muslims captured Noto and Scicli. In 865, Khafaja led in person an expedition against the environs of Enna—which may signify that the Byzantines had retaken it, or that they still held forts in its vicinity—before moving onto Syracuse, but again his son Muhammad was defeated in an ambush, losing 1,000 men.

In 866, Khafaja marched once more against Syracuse. From there he marched along the coast towards the north. There he met a delegation of the citizens of Taormina, who concluded a treaty with him, but soon broke it. In the same year, the Muslims retook Noto and Ragusa, which the Byzantines had apparently recaptured, or which had simply failed to renew their tribute payments after previous capitulations. Khafaja also captured the fortress called "al-Giran" and a few other towns, before an illness forced him to return to Palermo. In the summer of 867, after the illness had passed, Khafaja led his army towards Syracuse and Catania again, raiding their environs.

In September 867, the Byzantine emperor Michael III was killed and succeeded by Basil I the Macedonian. The new emperor was more energetic than his predecessor, and the relative peace on his eastern frontier allowed him to soon turn his full attention to the west: in 868–869 admiral Niketas Ooryphas was sent to relieve an Arab siege of Ragusa and re-establish imperial authority in Dalmatia, after which he sailed to Italy in an abortive attempt to conclude an alliance through marriage and co-ordinate a joint siege of Bari with the western emperor, Louis II. Another fleet was dispatched to Sicily in spring 868, but the Byzantines were heavily defeated by Khafaja in battle, after which the Muslims freely raided the environs of Syracuse. After Khafaga's return to Palermo, his son Muhammad launched a raid against mainland Italy, possibly besieging Gaeta.

On his return to Sicily, in January–February 869, Muhammad led an attempt to capture Taormina through treason, but although a small Muslim detachment gained control of the gates, Muhammad tarried to arrive with the main army and the detachment, fearing capture, abandoned the city. A month later, Khafaja launched an attack on the region of Mount Etna, probably against the town of Tiracia (modern Randazzo), while Muhammad raided around Syracuse. The Byzantines, however, sortied from the city and defeated Muhammad's men, inflicting heavy casualties, forcing Khafaja to turn on Syracuse himself. He reportedly laid siege to the city for a few weeks, before turning back towards Palermo in June. On his march home, however, he was assassinated by a dissatisfied Berber soldier, who then fled to Syracuse. It was a heavy loss for the Sicilian Muslims. The motives for the murder remain unclear: Metcalfe suggests a dispute over the division of spoils between the various sections of the Muslim army, but Alexander Vasiliev suggested the possibility that the Berber soldier was in the Byzantines' pay.

=== Muslim capture of Malta and Syracuse, 870–878 ===
Khafaja was succeeded by his son Muhammad, elected by the Sicilian army and confirmed by the Aghlabid emir. In contrast to his previous energy, Muhammad was a sedentary governor, preferring to remain in his capital rather than campaign in person. His tenure was furthermore cut short when he was assassinated by his court eunuchs on 27 May 871.

Nevertheless, his tenure is associated with a major success of long-term significance, the capture of Malta. Of all the islands around Sicily, this was the last to remain in Byzantine hands, and in 869 a fleet under Ahmad ibn Umar ibn Ubaydallah ibn al-Aghlab al-Habashi attacked it. The Byzantines, having received timely reinforcements, resisted successfully at first, but in 870 Muhammad sent a fleet from Sicily to the island, and the capital Melite fell on 29 August. The local governor was captured, the town was plundered—Ahmad al-Habashi reportedly took along the local cathedral's marble columns to decorate his palace—and its fortifications razed. The fall of Malta had important ramifications for the defence of what remained of Byzantine Sicily: with Reggio in Calabria and now Malta in their hands, the Muslims completed their encirclement of the island, and could easily interdict any aid sent from the east.

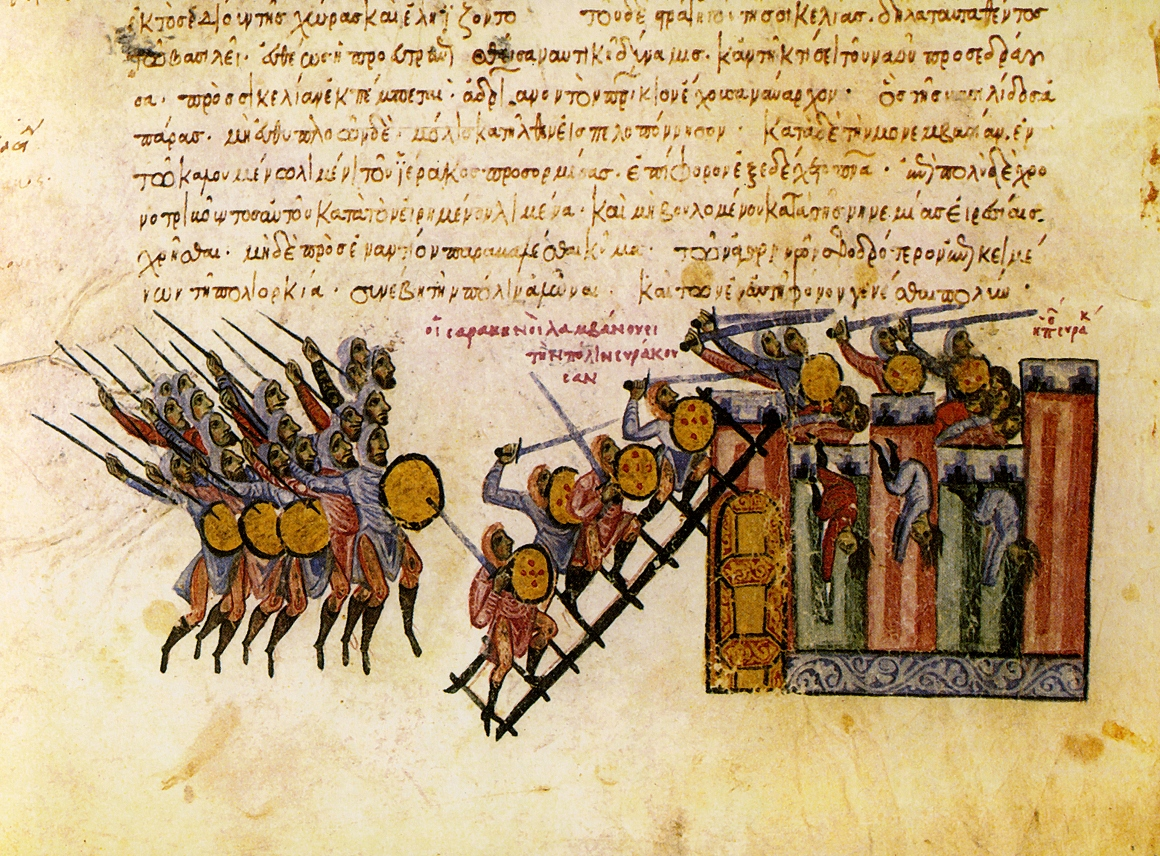
The fall of Syracuse to the Arabs, from the Madrid Skylitzes

From 872 to 877 there was apparently a period of calm, since the sources are silent on any military operations in Sicily. This was probably chiefly due to internal turmoil in Muslim Sicily, with six governors reported as having taken office during this period, as well as the weakness of the Aghlabid government on the Ifriqiyan mainland. In Italy, Muslim raids continued, but the Byzantines had a major success in 875 or 876, after the death of Louis II, when they took possession of Bari.

In 875, the unwarlike and pleasure-loving Aghlabid emir Muhammad II ibn Ahmad (r. 864–875) died, and was succeeded by his more energetic brother, Ibrahim II (r. 875–902). The new Emir of Ifriqiya was determined to finally capture Syracuse. He appointed a new governor for the island, Ja'far ibn Muhammad, and sent a fleet from Ifriqiya to his assistance. Ja'far began his campaign in 877, raiding the Byzantine territories and occupying some outlying forts around Syracuse, before settling down to besiege the city. The Muslims, well supplied with siege weapons, launched incessant attacks on the city's defenders, while Syracuse received scant reinforcements from Constantinople, where the bulk of the imperial fleet was apparently occupied with carrying building materials for a sumptuous new church built by Emperor Basil. During nine months of siege, the Arabs gradually occupied the outer defences, and finally, on 21 May 878, stormed the city. The population was massacred or enslaved, and the city thoroughly looted over two months.

== Completion of the Muslim conquest ==
=== Dissension among the Sicilian Muslims, 878–900 ===
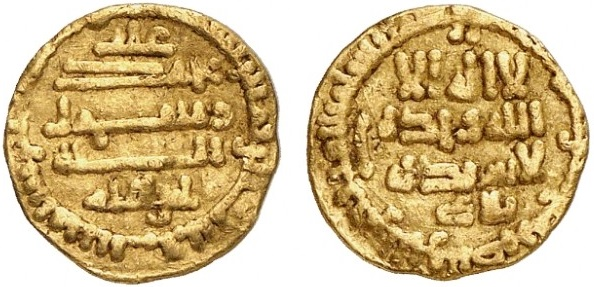
Aghlabid quarter-dinar, minted in Sicily, 879

Despite the major success of capturing Syracuse, the Muslim province in Sicily now degenerated into internal strife. Soon after the city's fall, Ja'far ibn Muhammad was murdered by his own slaves, at the instigation of his uncle and his brother, who then usurped the governorship. They were in turn overthrown in September 878, and sent to Ifriqiya where they were executed.

Ibrahim II then briefly named his own son as governor, before the appointment of the Sicilian Husayn ibn Rabah. Husayn renewed the campaigns against the remaining Byzantine strongholds in the northeast, especially Taormina, in 879–880, but without success. Indeed, the Byzantines were able to launch a limited counteroffensive in 880, when the admiral Nasar defeated an Aghlabid fleet in a daring night attack in the Ionian Sea, and then proceeded to raid the environs of Palermo, before defeating another Aghlabid fleet at the Battle of Stelai. In 881–882, Taormina was again the target of a determined Muslim attack, but held out, and a Muslim army under Abu Thawr was annihilated by the Byzantines at Caltavuturo, causing a large-scale mobilization of the Sicilian Muslims. Over the next years, the Muslims launched several raids, against Catania, Taormina and "the king's city" (possibly Polizzi) in 883, against Rometta and Catania in 884, and again against Catania and Taormina in 885. These expeditions were successful insofar as they yielded sufficient booty or tribute to pay the army, but failed to capture any Byzantine strongholds. The same period, 885–886, also saw a resurgence of Byzantine strength in the Italian mainland, where Nikephoros Phokas the Elder won a string of victories against the Muslims.

It was in this climate of military failure that the discontent among broad sections of the Sicilian Muslim population, hitherto kept in check by successful raiding, erupted into open rebellion. In the later narrative sources, this conflict between the ruling elite and the lower classes is often simplified to an "ethnic" struggle between the (ruling) "Arabs" and the (rebel) "Berbers". In December 886, the people of Palermo deposed the governor, Sawada ibn Khafaja, and sent him to Ifriqiya. Emir Ibrahim II appointed a new governor, who was able to calm the situation temporarily through successful raids and the victory over a Byzantine fleet off Milazzo in 888, which enabled the Sicilian Muslims to launch destructive raids into Calabria.

In the next year, Sawada returned, with fresh Ifriqiyan troops, and launched yet another failed attack on Taormina. However, in March 890, another rebellion broke out in Palermo, this time apparently among the Sicilian Arabs, and directed against Sawada's Ifriqiyans. Coupled with a major rebellion in Ifriqiya itself in 894–895, this put an end to Muslim raids against the Byzantines, and resulted in the conclusion of a truce in 895–896. According to its terms, in exchange for peace, over 40 months the Byzantines would gradually release their Muslim prisoners, by turns a group of "Arabs" and a group of "Berbers", totaling some 1,000 men. As Metcalfe remarks, "not only does this show the extent of Christian military success against the Aghlabids in eastern Sicily, but it may also have been deliberately aimed at exacerbating tensions within the Muslim army by playing off one faction against another in negotiating their staggered release".

In the event, a full-scale civil war between "Arabs" and "Berbers" erupted in 898, prompting the dispatch of Ibrahim II's son Abu'l-Abbas Abdallah, who had previously suppressed the rebellion in Iriqiya, to the island at the head of an army in summer 900. By then, the Muslims' infighting had acquired a regional dimension, with the Palermitans pitted against the Agrigentans. After negotiations between the Ifriqiyans and the rival Sicilian parties failed, Abu'l-Abbas Abdallah marched on Palermo, which he captured on 18 September. A great number of the rebels fled the city to the Byzantines in Taormina, with some reaching even Constantinople itself.

=== Ibrahim II's arrival and the fall of Taormina, 901–902 ===
The Byzantines tried to take advantage of the revolt, and began assembling forces at Messina and Reggio, while a fleet was dispatched from Constantinople. Abu'l-Abbas, however, did not tarry and as soon as he had suppressed the rebellion, marched against the Byzantines, ravaging the environs of Taormina and launching an unsuccessful siege of Catania before returning to winter in Palermo. In the next spring, he resumed his attack and assaulted Val Demone. To disrupt the Byzantine preparations, his forces then crossed over to the mainland. Reggio was captured on 10 July, and was subjected to a savage sack; a vast booty was collected, over 15,000 of its inhabitants were carted off as slaves, and the jizya imposed on the remainder. On his return to Sicily, Abu'l-Abbas came across a Byzantine fleet that had just arrived from Constantinople and thoroughly defeated it, capturing thirty of its vessels.

In early 902, Emir Ibrahim II was forced into abdication by his subjects, through the intervention of the Abbasid caliph. Ibrahim exchanged places with Abu'l-Abbas, who was named as his successor: Abu'l-Abbas left Sicily for Ifriqiya, while Ibrahim now resolved to take up the mantle of the Holy War, and accompanied a group of volunteers to Sicily in the summer. In an act that broke the long-standing stalemate on the island, Ibrahim and his followers advanced on Taormina, defeated the Byzantine garrison before its walls and laid siege to it. Left unsupported by the imperial government, the town fell on 1 August. Ibrahim then capitalized on his success by sending raiding parties against various strongholds in the vicinity, forcing either their capitulation and destruction or the payment of tribute.

Indefatigable, Ibrahim now crossed over into the mainland, where cities as far as Naples began to prepare to resist his attack. In the end, his advance was stopped at the siege of Cosenza, where Ibrahim died of dysentery on 24 October. His grandson stopped the military campaign and returned to Sicily.

== Aftermath ==
Although a few strongholds in the northeast remained unconquered and in Christian hands, the fall of Taormina marked the effective end of Byzantine Sicily, and the consolidation of Muslim control over the island. However, it did not signal the end of Arab–Byzantine warfare on and around the island.

In 909, Sicily, like Ifriqiya itself, passed under the control of the Fatimid Caliphate. The Fatimids (and after the 950s the Kalbid hereditary governors) continued the conquest, both against the Christian strongholds in the northeast (the Val Demone) and, more prominently, against the Byzantine possessions in southern Italy, punctuated by truces. Taormina itself threw off Muslim control soon after 902, and it was not until 962, possibly in response to the Byzantine reconquest of Crete the previous year, that the Fatimids retook the town, following a 30-week siege. In the next year, the Muslims attacked the last remaining Christian stronghold on the island, Rometta, which prompted an expedition sent by the Byzantine emperor, Nikephoros II Phokas, to recover Sicily. The Byzantines were at first successful, recapturing Messina and other fortresses in the northeast, but were repulsed before Rometta itself, and retreated back to Calabria. In the next year, they tried to resume their offensive, but were annihilated in the "Battle of the Straits" (waqʿat al-majāz) off Messina. As a result, a lasting truce was concluded by the two powers in 967.

Sicilian raids on Italy continued, and prompted the intervention of the Western Emperor, Otto II, in the peninsula in 982, where he was defeated at the Battle of Stilo. It was not until the 1020s that the Byzantines turned their attention to Sicily again, after a period of consolidation of their position in southern Italy under the capable Catepan Basil Boioannes. A large force landed in Messina in 1025, but the expedition was called off when news came of the death of Emperor Basil II. A final effort was made in 1038, when the talented young general George Maniakes was dispatched to Sicily, taking advantage of internal conflicts between the Kalbids and the Zirids. Maniakes quickly recaptured the entire eastern coast, but the conquest was left incomplete when he was recalled to Constantinople by jealous rivals. The Kalbids soon recovered their losses, and Messina, the last Byzantine outpost, fell in 1042.

The Arabs remained in control of Sicily until the Norman conquest of the island, which was also a prolonged affair, lasting from the first invasion in 1061 to the surrender of Noto in 1091.

== Impact ==
The long Arab–Byzantine struggle left abiding traces on the island's subsequent history: although under Muslim rule, Sicilian culture quickly became Arabicized, the Christian communities in the central and eastern parts largely resisted islamization. The level of Arab influence, as attested through surviving toponyms, also varied across the island depending on the length of resistance and the extent of Arab settlement: there are many Arab-derived names in the western third (the Val di Mazara), and a mixture in the southeastern third (Val di Noto), while Christian identities survived most strongly in the northeastern third of the island (Val Demone), which was the last to fall, where Christian refugees from other parts of Sicily had assembled, and which furthermore remained in contact with Byzantine southern Italy.

== Sources ==
- Abun-Nasr, Jamil M. (1987), A History of the Maghrib in the Islamic Period, Cambridge, New York, Melbourne: Cambridge University Press, ISBN 0-521-33767-4
- Brown, Thomas S. (2008). "Byzantine Italy (680–876)". In Shepard, Jonathan (ed.). The Cambridge History of the Byzantine Empire c. 500–1492. Cambridge: Cambridge University Press. pp. 433–464. ISBN 978-0-521-83231-1.
- Bury, John Bagnell (1912), A History of the Eastern Roman Empire from the Fall of Irene to the Accession of Basil I (A.D. 802–867), London: Macmillan and Co.
- Lev, Yaacov (1984). "The Fāṭimid Navy, Byzantium and the Mediterranean Sea, 909–1036 CE/297–427 AH". Byzantion. 54: 220–252. ISSN 0378-2506.
- Metcalfe, Alex (2009). The Muslims of Medieval Italy. Edinburgh: Edinburgh University Press. ISBN 978-0-7486-2008-1.
- Pryor, John H. (2003), "The Mediterranean breaks up, 500–1000", in Abulafia, David (ed.), The Mediterranean in History, London: Thames & Hudson, pp. 155–182, ISBN 0-89236-725-3
- Runciman, Steven (1958), The Sicilian Vespers, Cambridge: Cambridge University Press, OCLC 930490694
- Treadgold, Warren (1988). The Byzantine Revival, 780–842. Stanford, California: Stanford University Press. ISBN 978-0-8047-1462-4.
- Vasiliev, A. A. (1923), "Chapter V. (B) The Struggle with the Saracens (867–1057)", The Cambridge Medieval History, Vol. IV: The Eastern Roman Empire (717–1453), Cambridge University Press, pp. 138–150, OCLC 490614728
- Vasiliev, Alexander A. (1935). Byzance et les Arabes, Tome I: La dynastie d'Amorium (820–867). Corpus Bruxellense Historiae Byzantinae (in French). Vol. 1. French ed.: Henri Grégoire, Marius Canard. Brussels: Éditions de l'Institut de philologie et d'histoire orientales.
- Vasiliev, Alexander A. (1968). Byzance et les Arabes, Tome II: Les relations politiques de Byzance et des Arabes à l'époque de la dynastie macédonienne (les empereurs Basile I, Léon le Sage et Constantin VII Porphyrogénète) 867-959 (253-348). Première partie: Les relations politiques de Byzance et des Arabes à l'époque de la dynastie macédonienne. Première période, de 867 à 959. Corpus Bruxellense Historiae Byzantinae (in French). Vol. 2.1. French ed.: Henri Grégoire, Marius Canard. Brussels: Fondation Byzantine.
