= Abdallah II of Ifriqiya =

Emir of Ifriqiya (902 – 903)

Abu 'l-Abbas Abdallah II أبو العباس عبد الله

Emir of Ifriqiya, Sicily and Malta
- Reign: 23 October 902 – 27 July 903
- Predecessor: Ibrahim II ibn Ahmad
- Successor: Abu Mudhar Ziyadat Allah III
- Died: 27 July 903
- Spouse: unknown
- Children: Abbas, Ziyadat Allah
Names
- Abu al-Abbas Abdallah ibn Ibrahim ibn Ahmad ibn Muhammad
- House: Aghlabid
- Father: Ibrahim ibn Ahmad
- Military career
- Service years: c. 890–902
- Conflicts: Arab Conquest of Sicily

Abu 'l-Abbas Abdallah II (Arabic: أبو العباس عبد الله, Abū l-ʿAbbās ʿAbd Allāh; died 27 July 903) was the Emir of Ifriqiya from 902 to 903.

Mounting reports of the cruel atrocities of Abdallah's father Ibrahim II made their way to Baghdad, prompting the Abbasid Caliph al-Mu'tadid to finally react. The Caliph dispatched a messenger who arrived in Tunis in late 901/early 902 with his written instructions. Citing the mistreatment of his subjects, the Caliph recalled Ibrahim II to Baghdad and deprived him of the governorship of Ifriqiya, appointing in his stead his son Abu al-Abbas Abdallah (then on campaign in Sicily).

Surprisingly, Ibrahim II dutifully accepted the news without objection. With apparently genuine repentance, donning the garments of a penitent and declaring a pious change of heart, Ibrahim II remitted tributes, abolished illegal taxes, opened his jails, manumitted his slaves, and delivered a large chunk of his treasury to the jurists of Kairouan to distribute to the needy. Ibrahim II abdicated his power to his son Abu al-Abbas Abdallah, who returned from Sicily in February–March 902 to assume title as the new emir Abdallah.

Abdallah took over the Emirate after his father Abu Ishaq Ibrahim II was forced to abdicate due to his tyrannical rule. He immediately set about trying to reduce the autonomy of the Kutama Berbers in order to stop the Ismailite mission of Abu 'Abdullah al-Shi'i, but without success. An effort to replace the Malikite law schools with Hanifites from Iraq also failed. Abdullah was murdered by his son Abu Muda Ziyadat Allah in 903 in order to secure his throne.
