= Hadrumetum Punic inscriptions =

The Hadrumetum Punic inscriptions are Punic votive inscriptions found in the Old City of Sousse (ancient Hadrumetum).

They were discovered between the Great Mosque of Sousse and the Ribat of Sousse, where the French authorities had chosen to build Sousse's first church, the Église Notre-Dame-de-l'Immaculée-Conception de Sousse, built between 1865 and 1867. After WWII war damage was repaired, the church was later demolished by the local authorities as part of a renovation of the Old City.

The first nine inscriptions were published by Julius Euting in 1872. Further inscriptions were found in 1946 after World War II bomb damage exposed more of the area around the church.

The inscriptions are held between the Hermitage Museum the Sousse Archaeological Museum, the Louvre and the Maison méditerranéenne des Sciences de l'homme.

== Euting inscriptions ==
Euting bought the steles from Maltese masons at La Goulette (Tunis), who discovered them in 1867 during foundation work for a church in Sousse 7 meters underground. The church was the Église Notre-Dame-de-l'Immaculée-Conception de Sousse, built between 1865 and 1867 by the French authorities as the first church in Sousse. After war damage was repaired, it was later demolished by the local authorities as part of a renovation of the Old City of Sousse.

The Euting inscriptions were donated to the Hermitage Museum. They were notably not published in the Corpus Inscriptionum Semiticarum.

=== Gallery ===
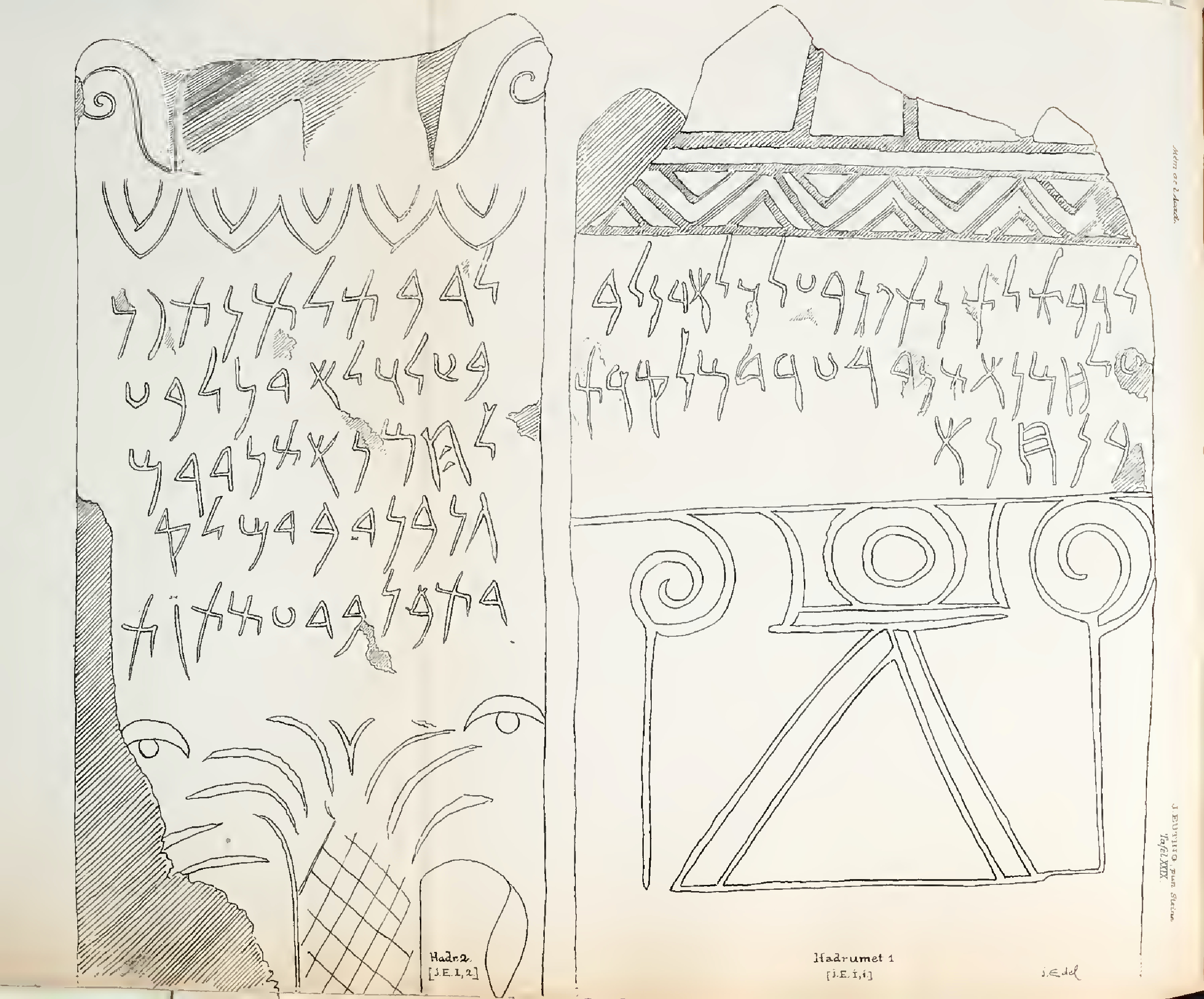
Hadrumet 1 and 2

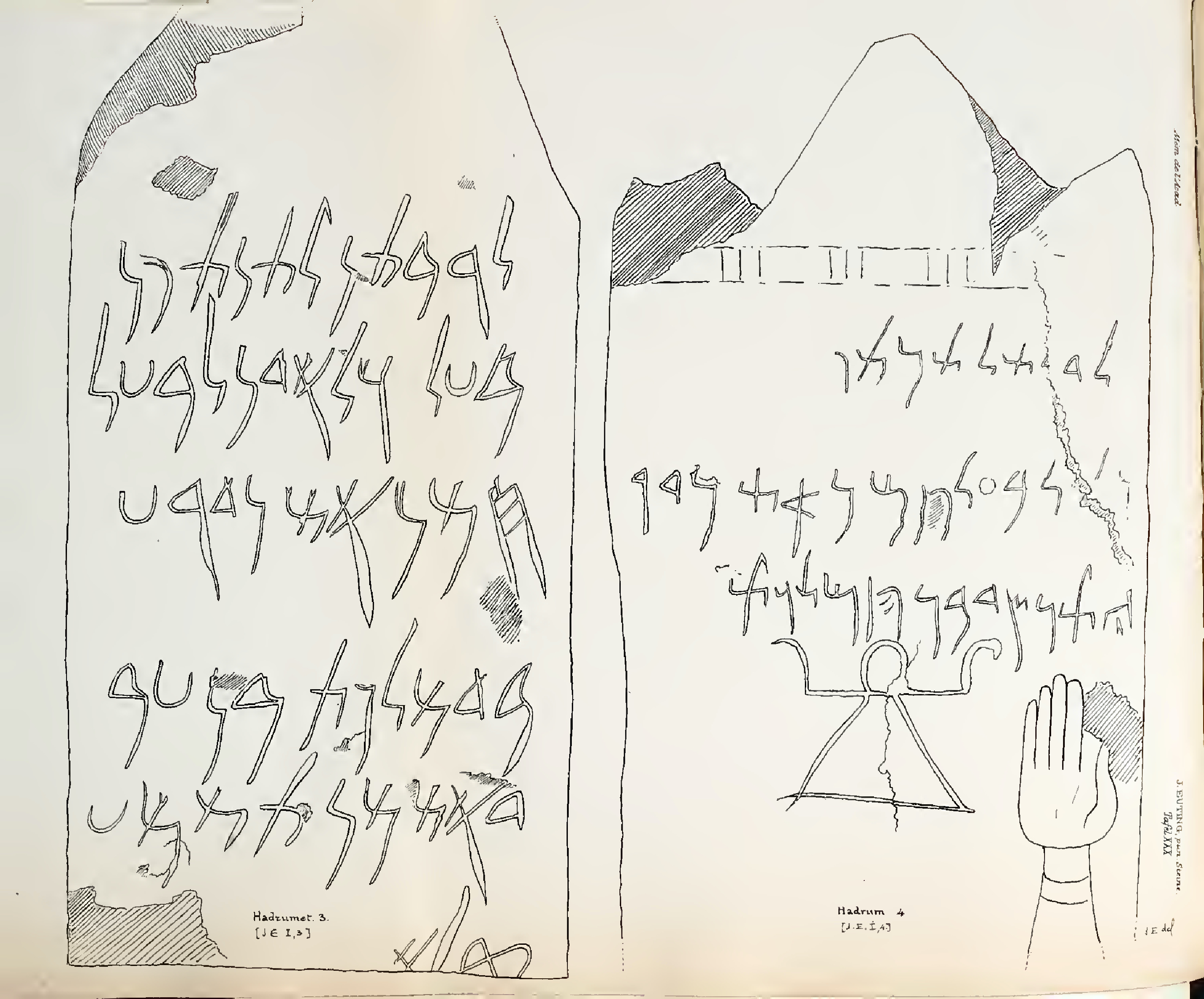
Hadrumet 3 and 4

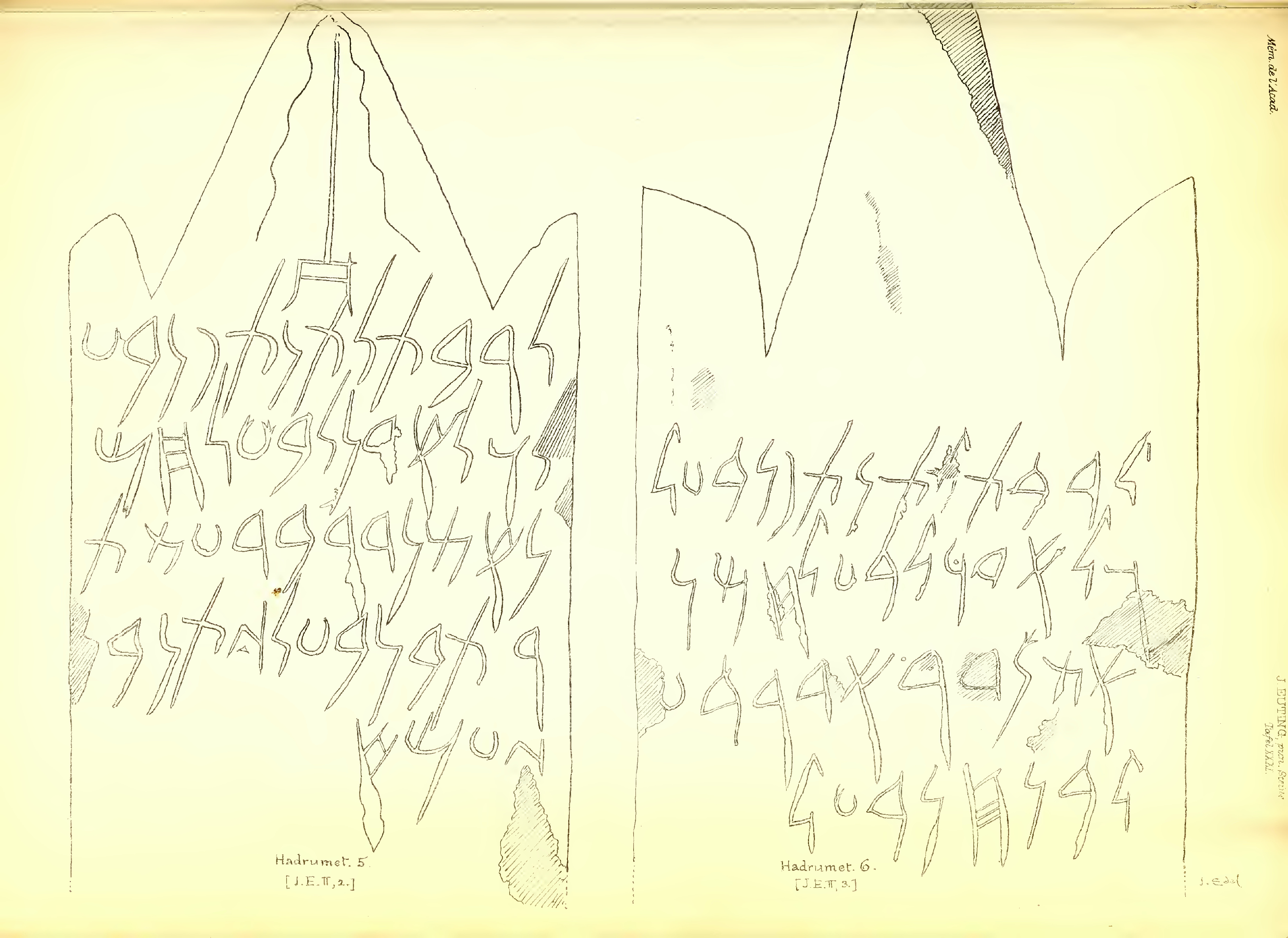
Hadrumet 5 and 6

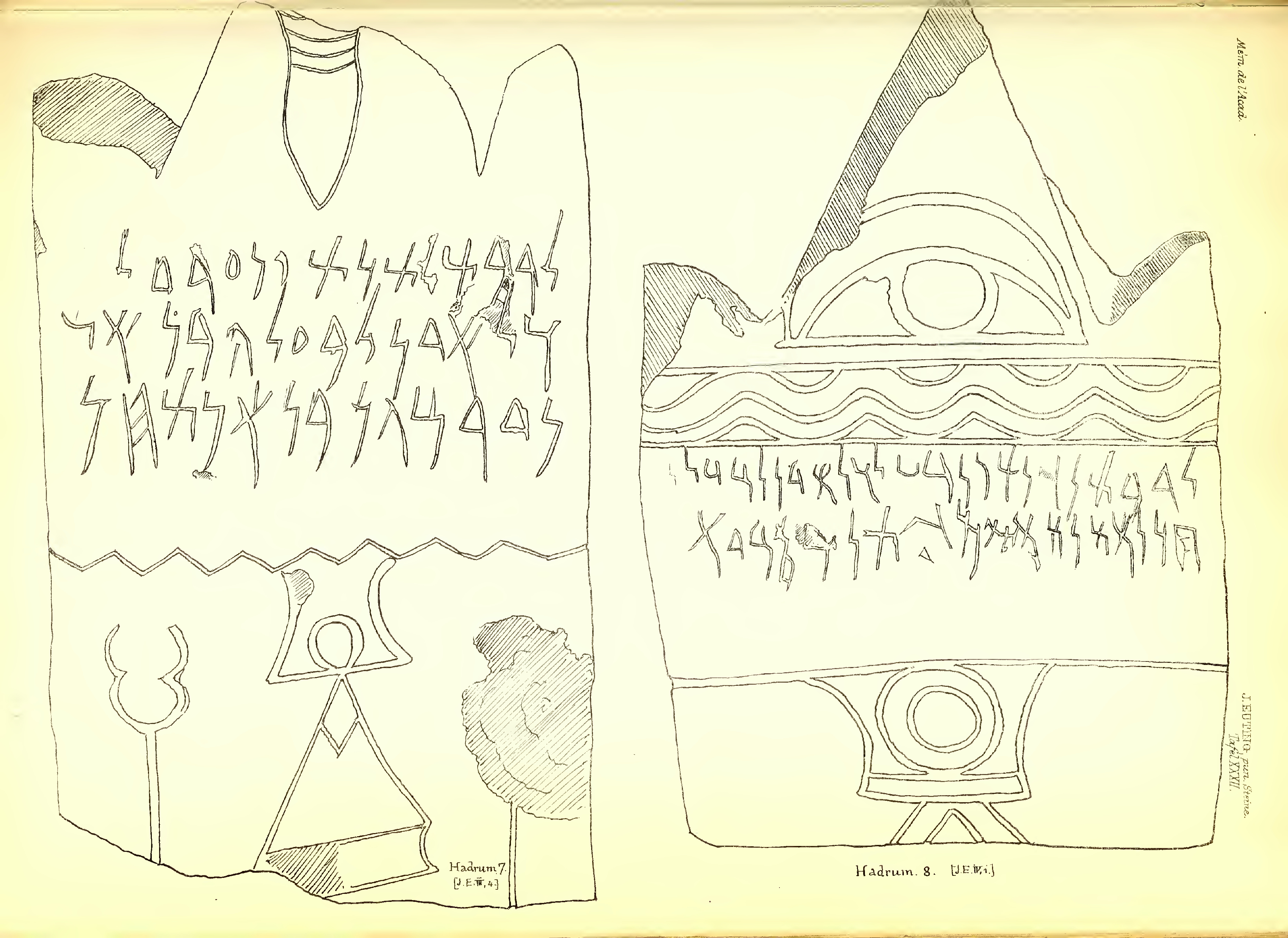
Hadrumet 7 (KAI 97 and Lidz NE 432,1) and 8 (Lidz NE 432,2)

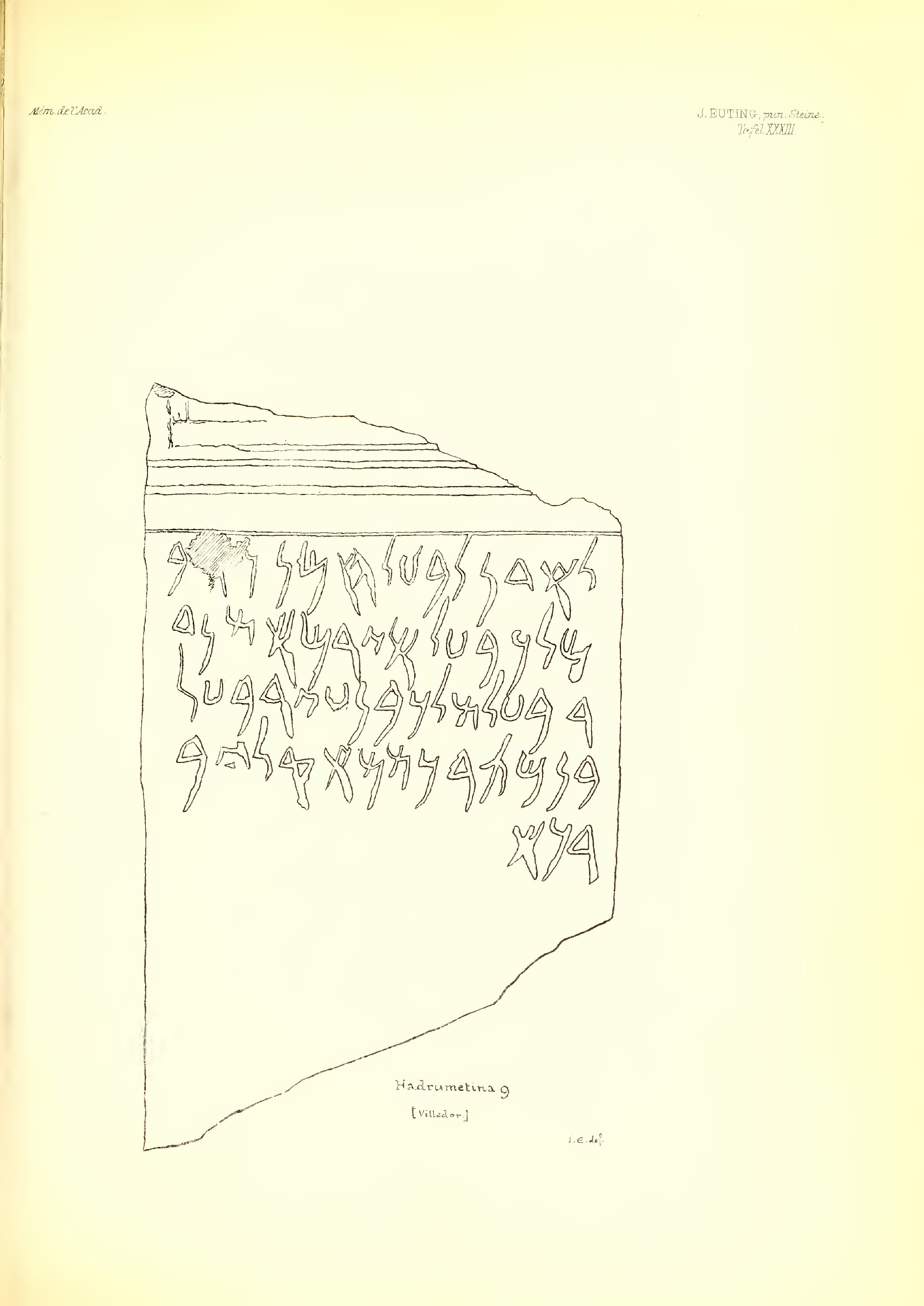
Hadrumetina 9 (KAI 98 and Lidz NE 432,3)

== Truillot inscriptions ==
In 1946, Alexis Truillot, curator of the Sousse Archaeological Museum, took advantage of the excavations carried out at the church, following the destruction in the war, to attempt a survey of the site. Nine further Punic stelae were found, including three with inscriptions.

== Bibliography ==
- Euting, Julius (1871). Punische Steine. Mémoires de l'Académie Impériale des Sciences de St.-Pétersbourg (in German). Académie impériale des sciences de St.-Pétersbourg.
