= Zawiya of Sidi Bouraoui =

- زاوية سيدي بوراوي
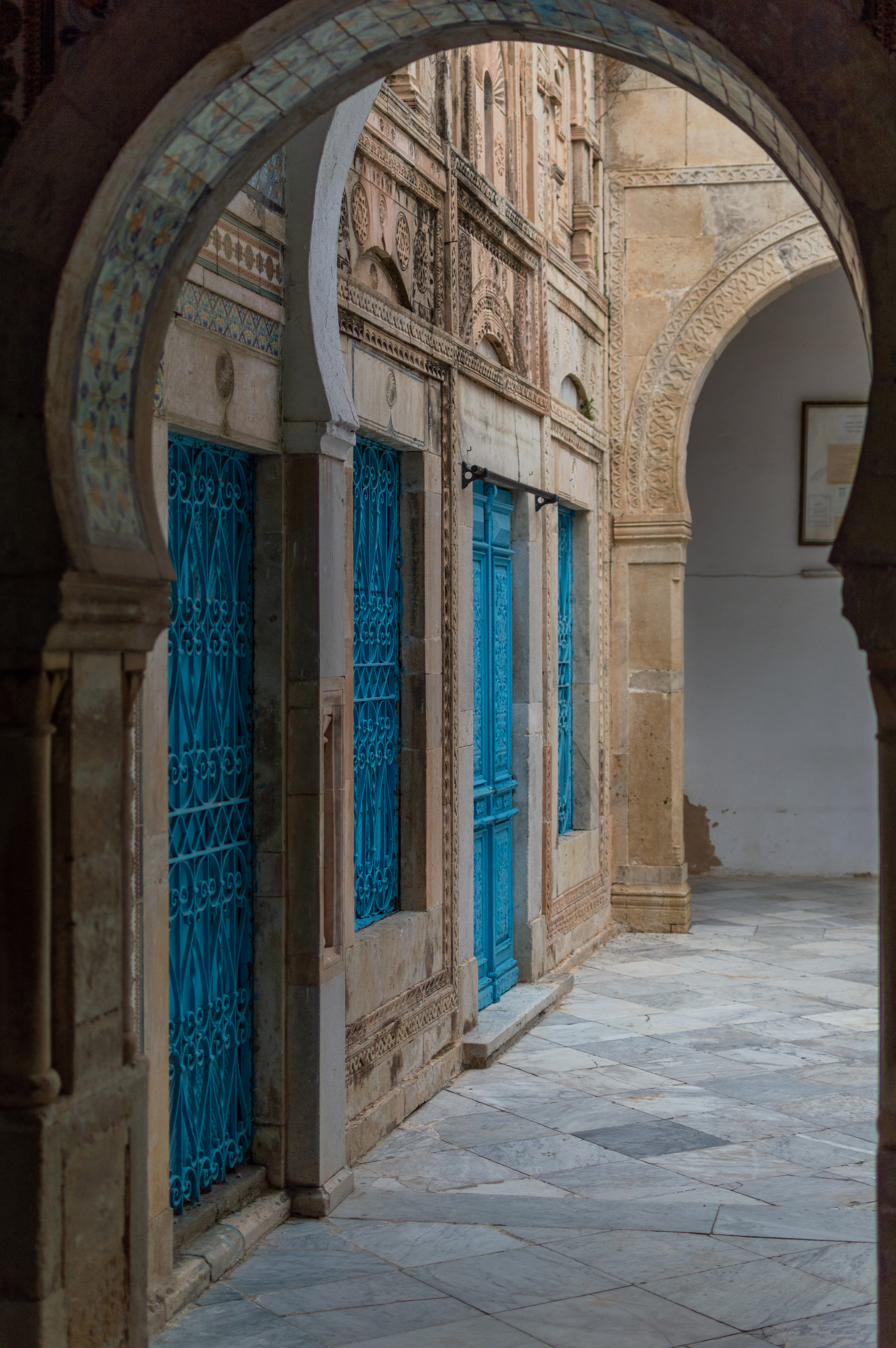
- Zawiya of Sidi Bouraoui
- Location: Tunisia
- Type: Zawiya

The Zawiya of Sidi Bouraoui is a Tunisian zawiya located in the medina of Sousse.

== History ==
The zawiya is located in the center of the medina of Sousse. It bears the name of the patron saint and protector of the city, Sidi Abu Abdallah Ibn Imran Bouraoui, a sufi marabout originally from the region of Souss in Morocco and who settled in the city during the Hafsid period.

The zawiya shelters the tomb of the saint that the locals continue to visit asking for his grace, in particular during important moments of life: marriages, circumcisions and religious events.
