= Ribat of Sousse =

Fort in Tunisia

Coordinates: 35.8277°N 10.6388°E

Ribat of Sousse رباط سوسة
- Sousse, Tunisia
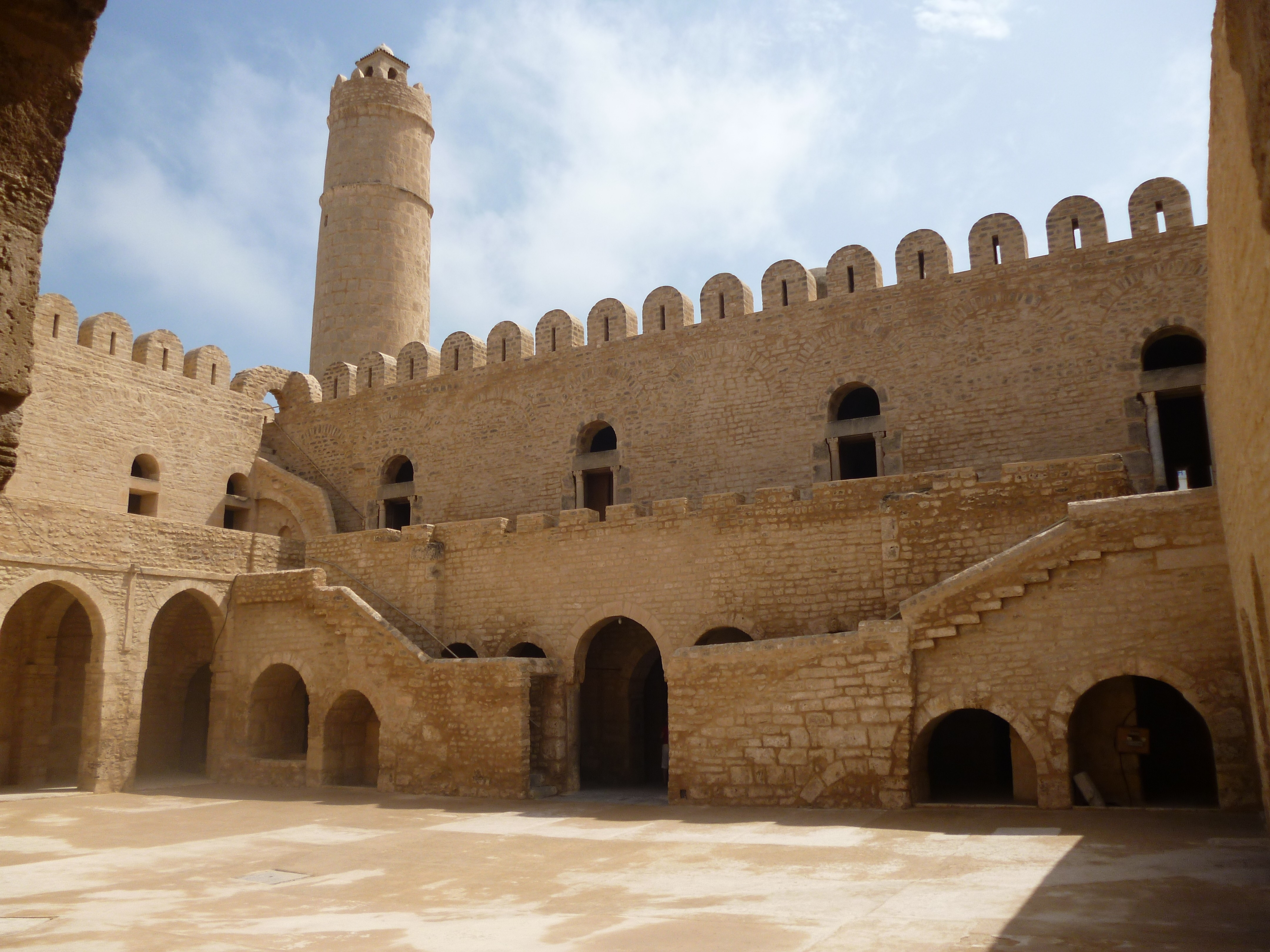
- View from the courtyard

Site information
- Type: Aghlabid Ribat
- Condition: Intact

Site history
- Built: 8th to 9th centuries
- Materials: stone

Ribat of Sousse (Arabic: رباط سوسة) is a ribat in the city of Sousse, Tunisia. Although scholars differ on the chronology of its original construction, it was most likely founded in the 8th century and reconstructed or completed in its current form during the early 9th century, under the Aghlabid dynasty. Although a large number of ribats were built in the region during that period, the Ribat of Sousse is by far the best-preserved.

== History ==
The Ribat of Sousse was founded during the 8th century, or late 8th century, during the tenure of the Abbasid governor Yazid ibn Hatim al-Muhallabi (d. 787). There is also evidence that the site of the ribat was formerly occupied in Classical antiquity, reflecting the fact that many ribats in Tunisia were built over the remains of more ancient fortifications.

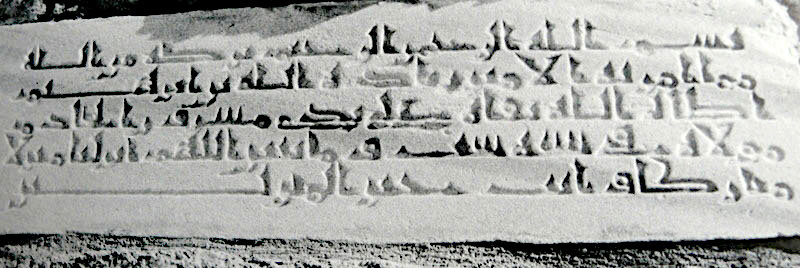
The Aghlabid inscription on the tower (uncoloured photo)

In the year 800 the Abbasid Caliph Harun al-Rashid granted the governorship of Ifriqiya (roughly modern-day Tunisia) to Ibrahim ibn al-Aghlab, who founded the Aghlabid dynasty that ruled the region for the next century, nominally on behalf of the Abbasids. This was period in which the construction of ribats proliferated, and they were constructed at regular intervals along Ifriqiya's coastline, permitting signals to be sent rapidly between them. An inscription carved on a marble plaque over the doorway of the ribat's cylindrical tower records the name of the Aghlabid emir Ziyadat Allah I and the year 821. It also names Masrur al-Khadim, a freed slave and Ziyadat Allah's mawla, as responsible for the construction. This is the oldest surviving Islamic-era monumental inscription in Tunisia. The full Arabic inscription and its translation reads:

بسم الله الرحمن الرحيم. بركة من الله. ممّا أمر به الأميرُ زيادة الله بن ابراهيم أطال الله بقاءه على يد مسرور مولاه في سنة ست ومئتين. اللّهم أنزلنا مُنزَلاً مُباركاً وأنت خيرُ المُنزِلين.

In the name of God, the Kind, the Merciful. God’s Blessing. This is what the Emir Ziyādat Allāh ibn Ibrāhīm has ordered, may God prolong his life!... by the hands of Masrūr al-Khūdim [the servant], his emancipated slave, in the year 206 [821 AD]. O God, lead us down into a blessed home. You are the best of leaders.

Some scholars have interpreted the date in this inscription as the year of the ribat's original foundation. Other scholars, such as Alexandre Lézine and Jonathan Bloom, interpret this date as the year when the tower was added to the existing ribat. Georges Marçais cited the year 821 as the date of the tower's construction and the completion of the ribat in its current form. Mourad Rammah states that the ribat was almost certainly founded in the 8th century but was completely reconstructed by Ziyadat Allah I in 821. Scholar Sibylle Mazot states that soil analysis has demonstrated that the ribat's foundation is indeed older than 821 and dates back to the 8th century, so that the year 821 signifies the date of a reconstruction.

During the restoration, two floors, a basement, and battlements were added, as well as thirty rooms for guards to live complete with bathroom and toilet. A mosque was also established on the terrace and used by the citizens of Sousse especially during the Eid al-Fitr or Eid al-Adha. It is considered the first mosque built in the city, older even than the Bou Ftata Mosque and the Great Mosque of Sousse. The ribat is also equipped with a water basin that collects rainwater for the use of drinking and washing. The basin was first built by Ibrahim ibn al-Aghlab and was expanded later by Ziyadat Allah. After the Byzantine city of Melite (modern Mdina on Malta) was captured by the Aghlabids in 870, marble and columns plundered from its churches was used to build the Ribat.

The north and east wings of the ribat's interior were rebuilt or restored in 1722. Other than this, the building has mostly retained its original aspect. In 1988 it was inscribed, along with the Medina of Sousse, as a UNESCO World Heritage Site.

== Architecture ==
The ribat is built of stone and consists of a square walled enclosure measuring around 38 meters long and 11 meters high. Its plan resembles the original form of the Ribat of Monastir founded in 796 by Harthama ibn A'yan. Round towers reinforce its corners and the middle of its of its four sides, except for the southeastern corner, where a square tower serves as the base for a tall cylindrical tower on top of it, and the middle south side, where a projecting rectangular salient serves as the entrance gate. The gate entrance is framed by reused ancient columns. Inside the gate are narrow openings for a former portcullis and for defenders to drop projectiles or boiling oil on attackers. The vestibule of the gate is covered by a groin vault and flanked by guardrooms.

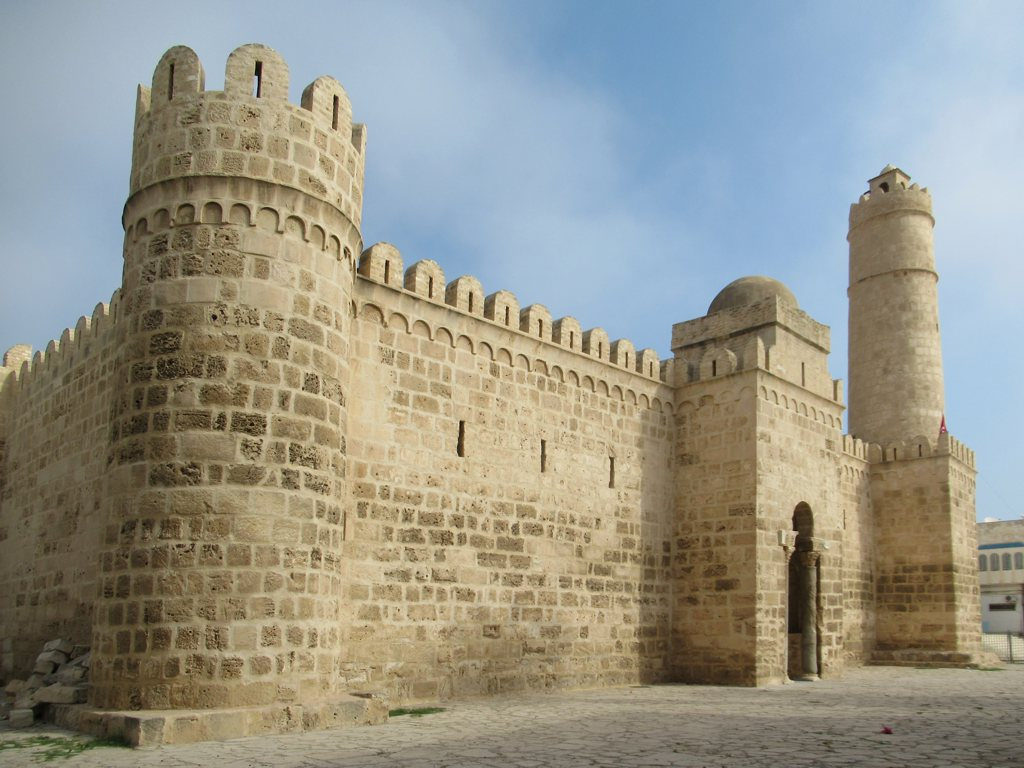
Exterior of the ribat

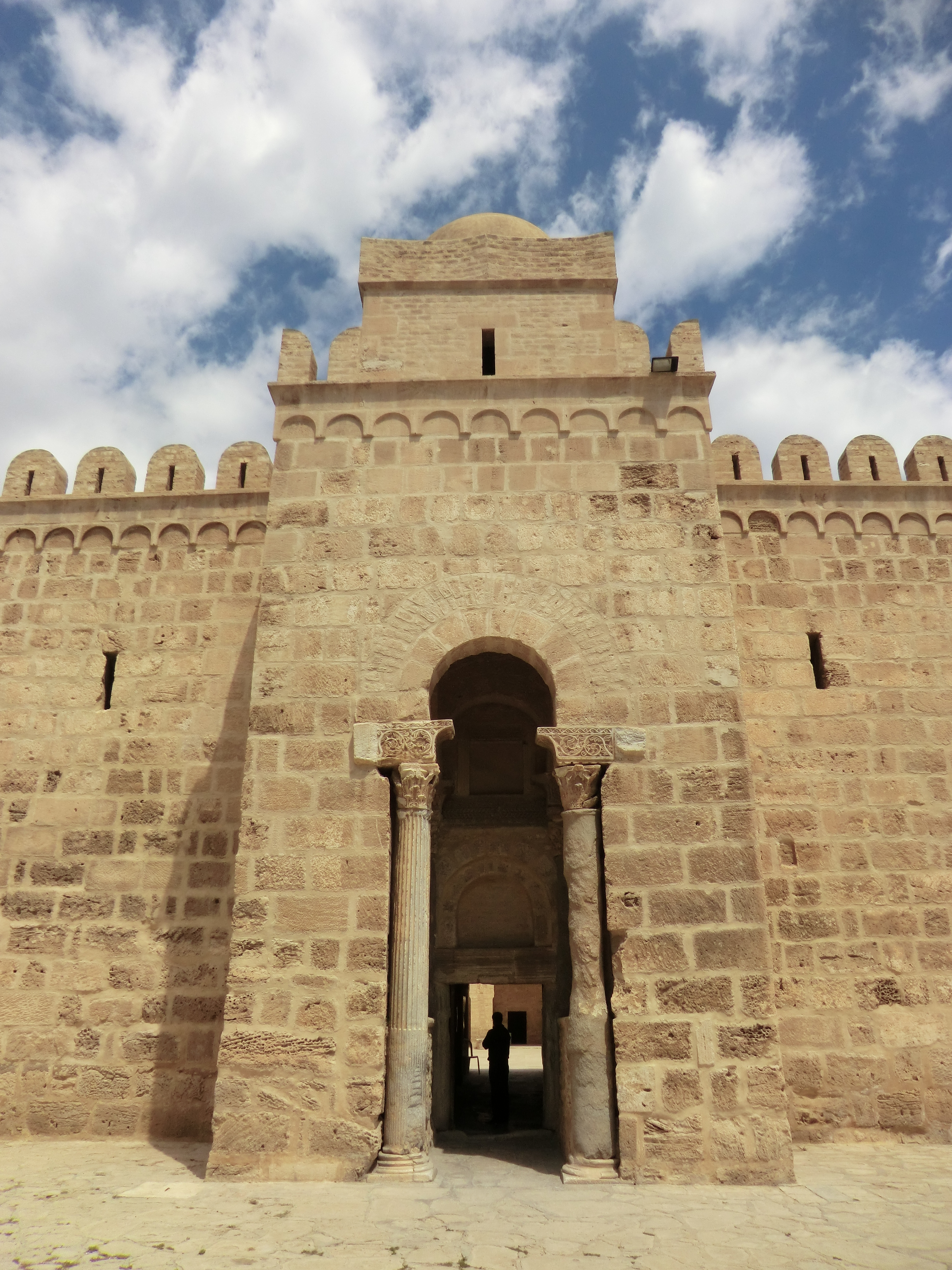
Entrance portal of the ribat

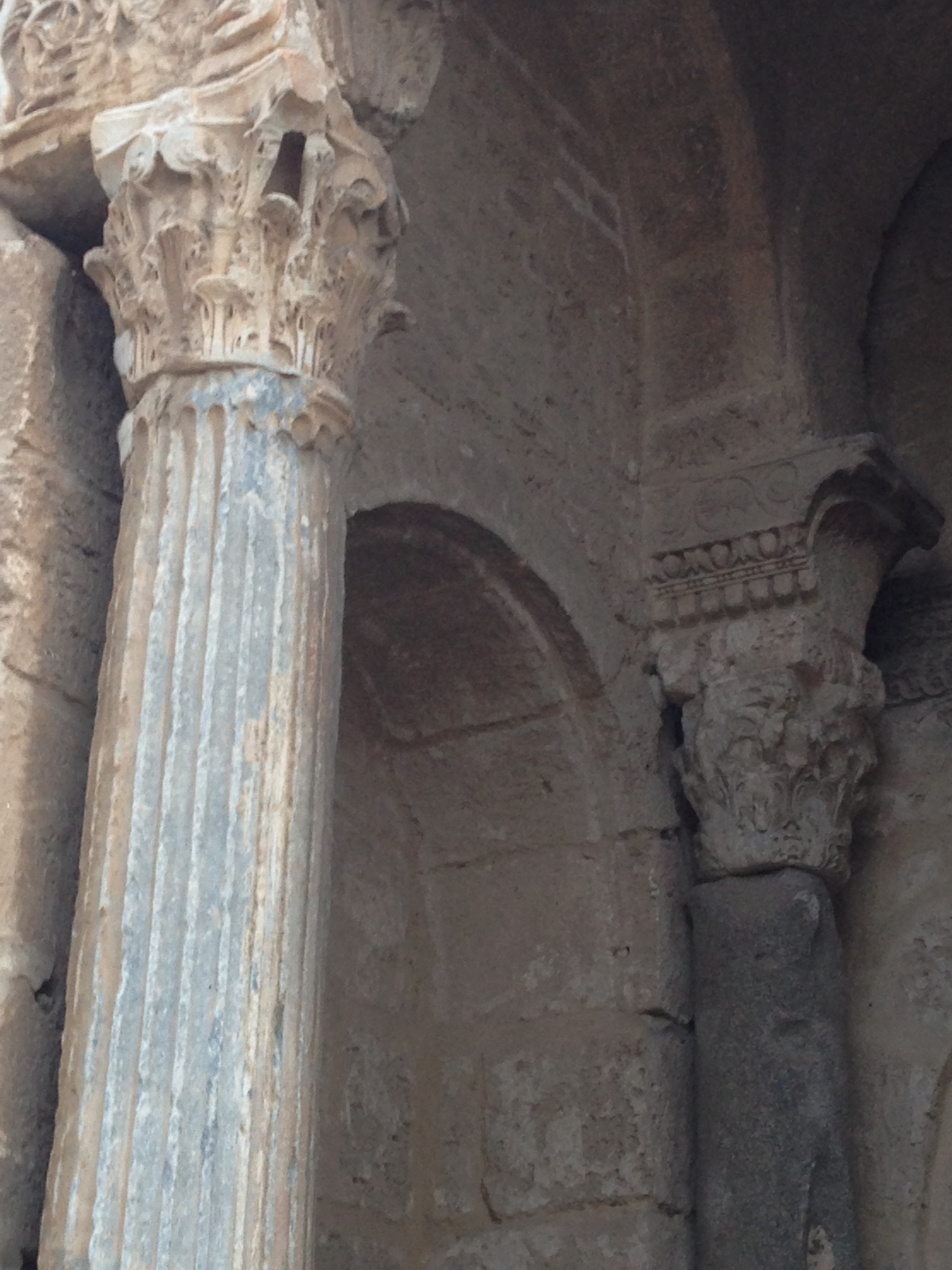
Some of the reused ancient columns in the entrance

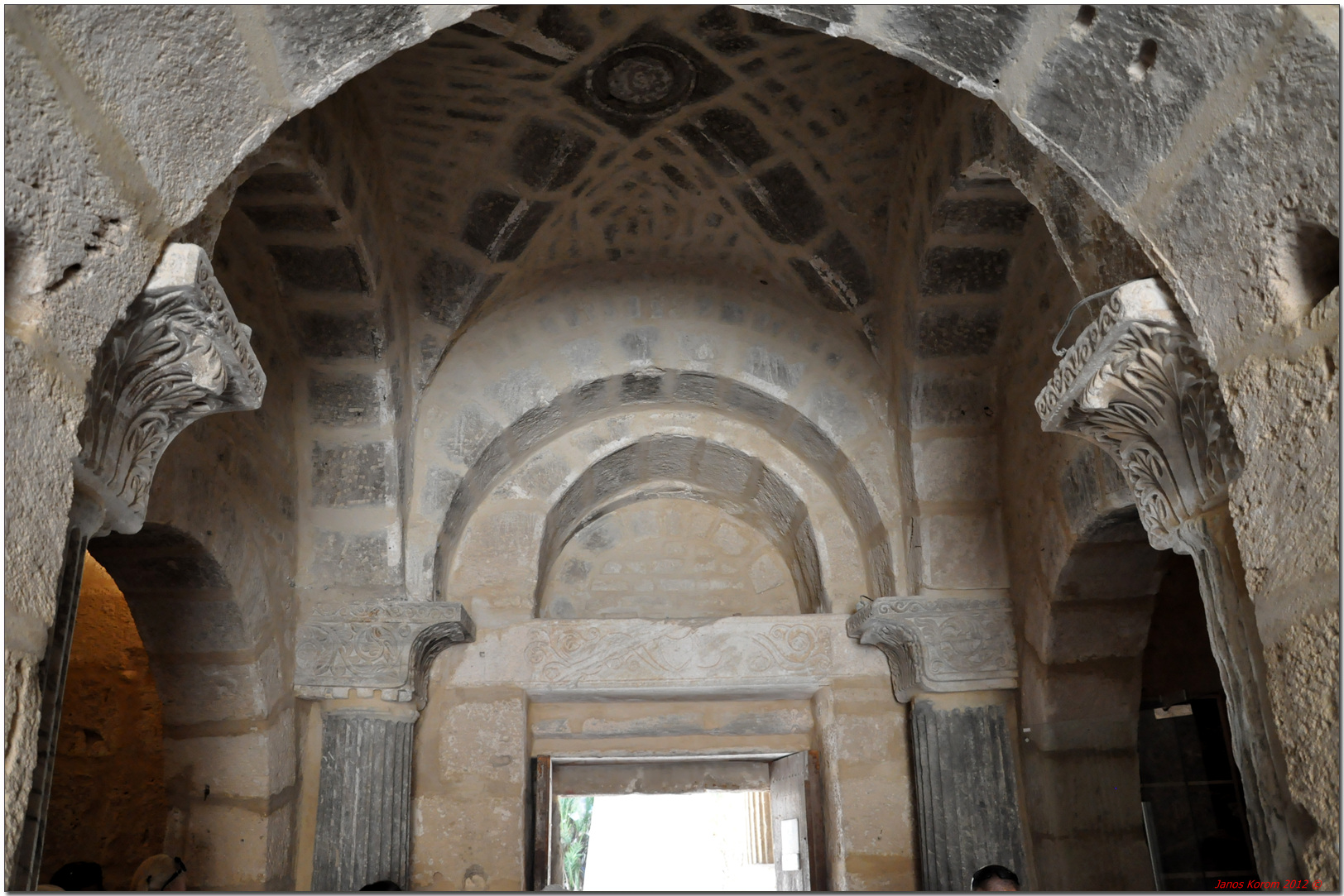
Vestibule inside the gate

The gate leads to the rectangular courtyard which is flanked by arcades on four sides, behind which are lines of small rooms and an upper floor. There are 33 narrow rooms in total on the ground floor. Most of the rooms and galleries are covered by barrel vaults made of rubble stone, except for those of the north and east sides (rebuilt in the 18th century) which contain groin vaults. Stairs lead to the upper floor, which is lined by more rooms on three sides. The south side is occupied by a long vaulted hall with a mihrab (niche symbolizing the direction of prayer), which is the oldest preserved mosque or prayer hall in North Africa. The room is divided into two aisles by a row of cross-shaped pillars supporting a vaulted ceiling. It had a capacity of about 200 worshipers.

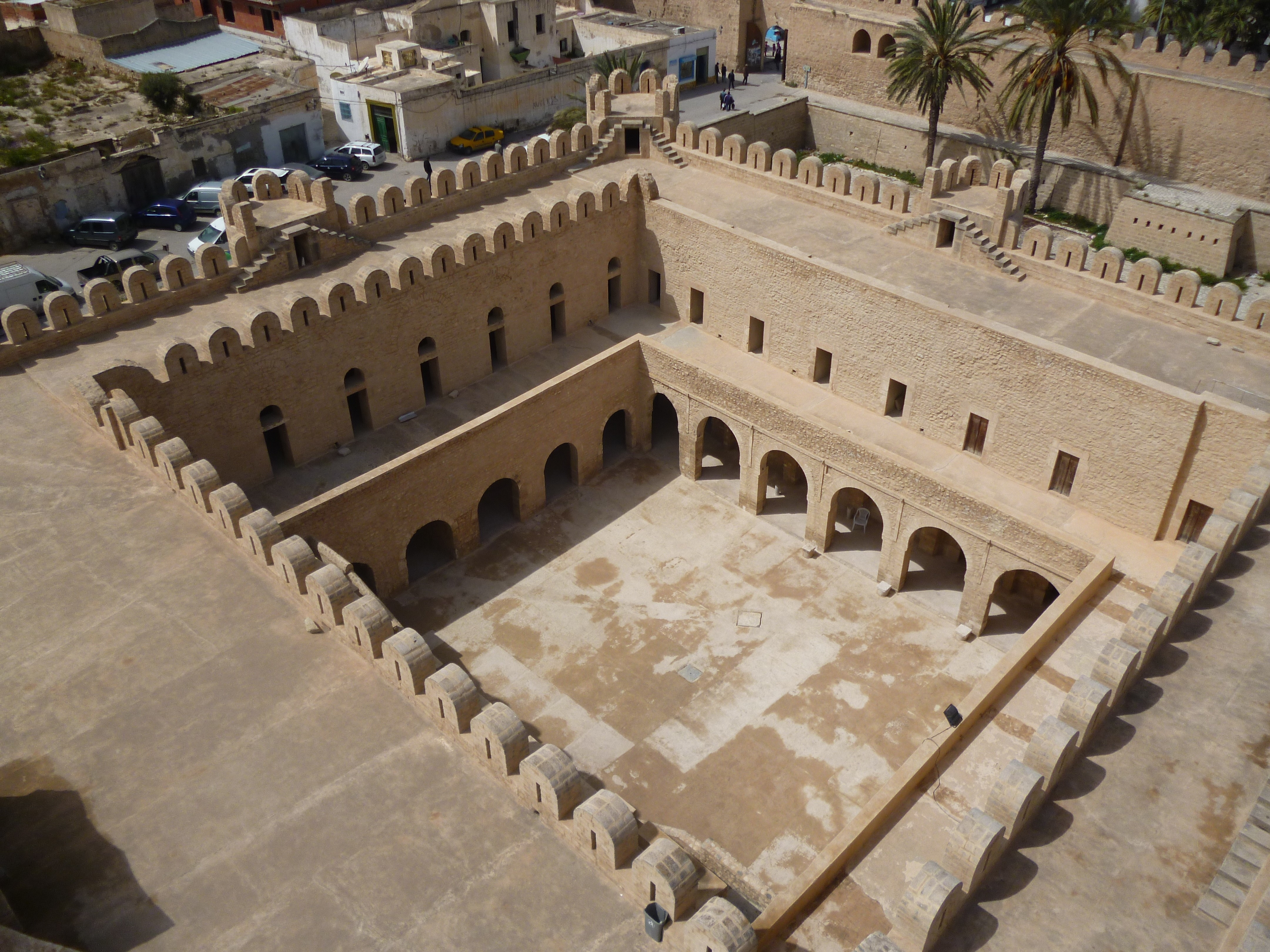
Courtyard of the ribat

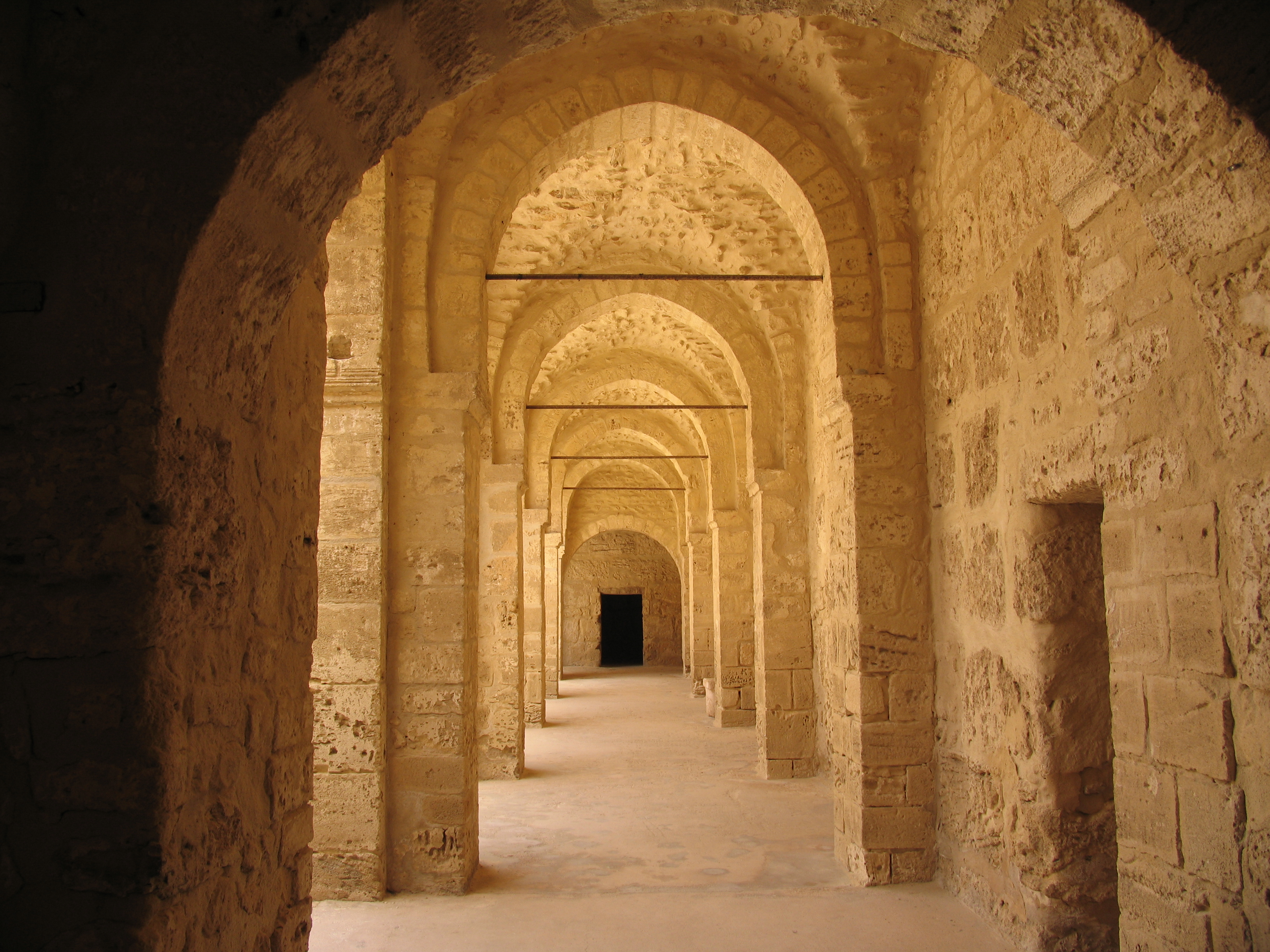
One of the ground-floor galleries around the courtyard

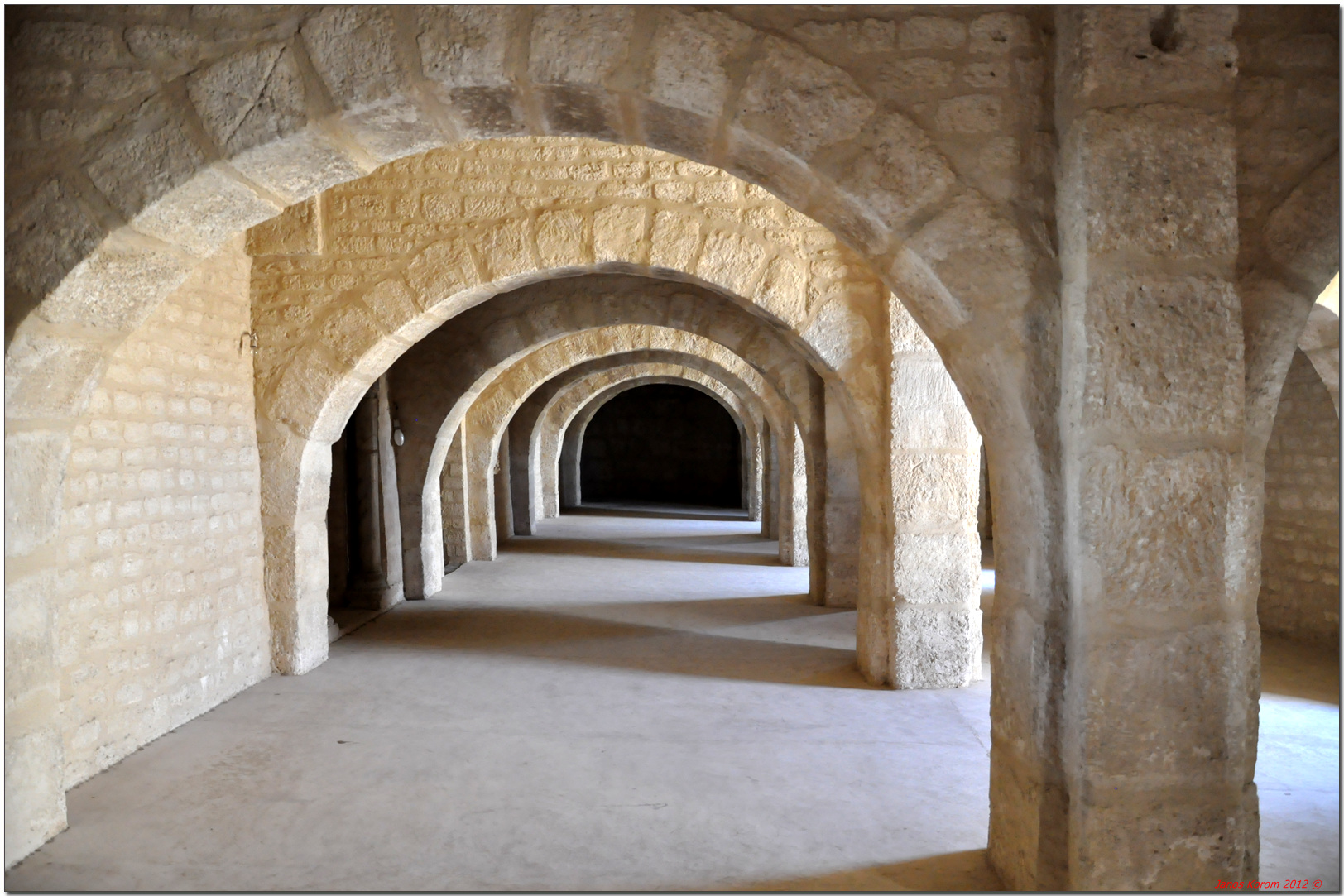
Inside of the prayer hall

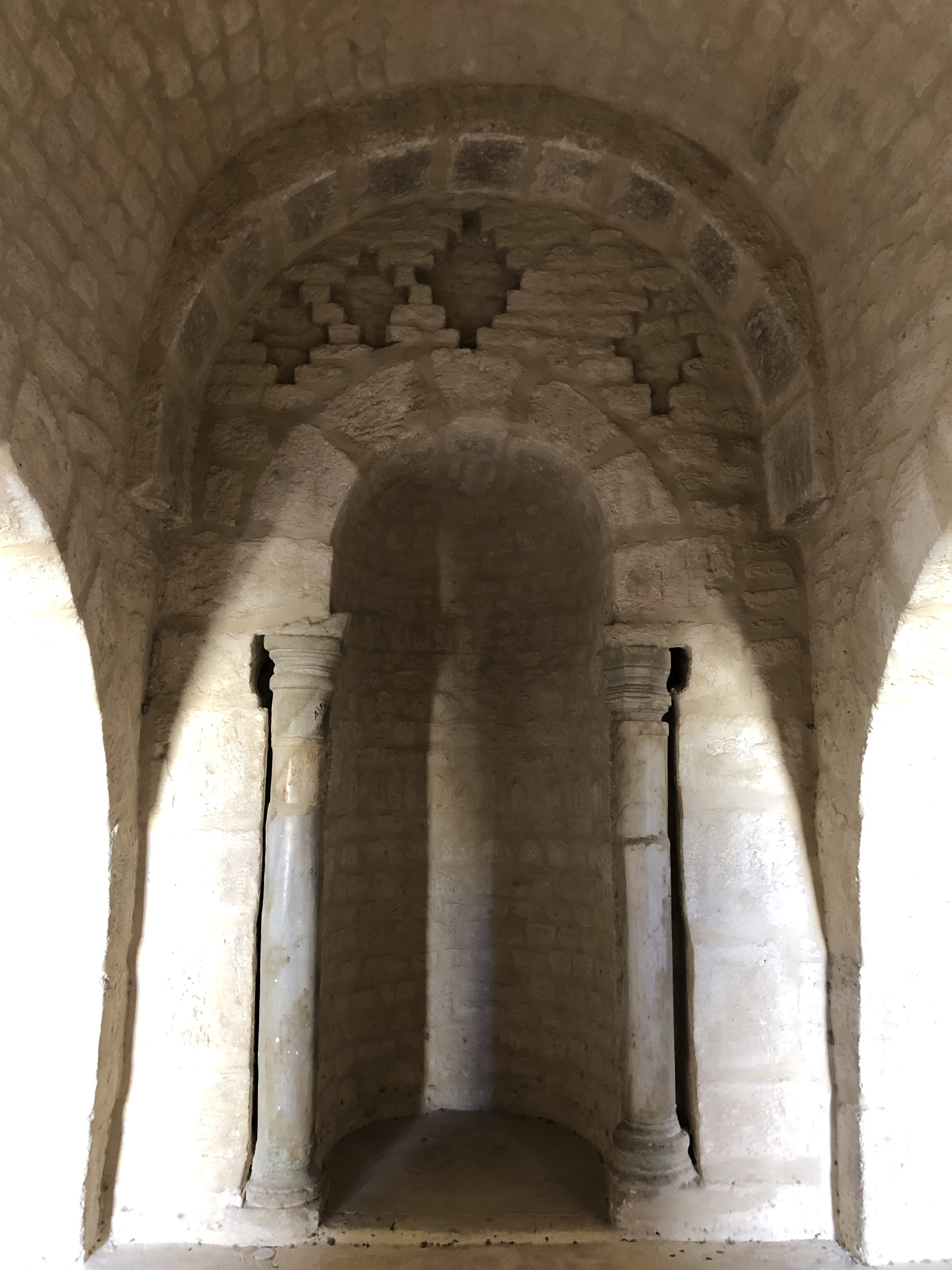
Mihrab in the prayer hall

Another set of stairs leads to the roof and the top of the walls, which are crowned with crenellations on both their inner and outer edges. Another small room in the fortress, located above the gate at the top of the walls, contains another mihrab and is covered by a dome supported on squinches. This is the oldest example of a dome with squinches in Islamic North Africa. The cylindrical tower above the southeast corner was most likely intended as a lighthouse. It can be ascended via a spiral staircase inside. It has a marble inscription plaque over its entrance (mentioned above).

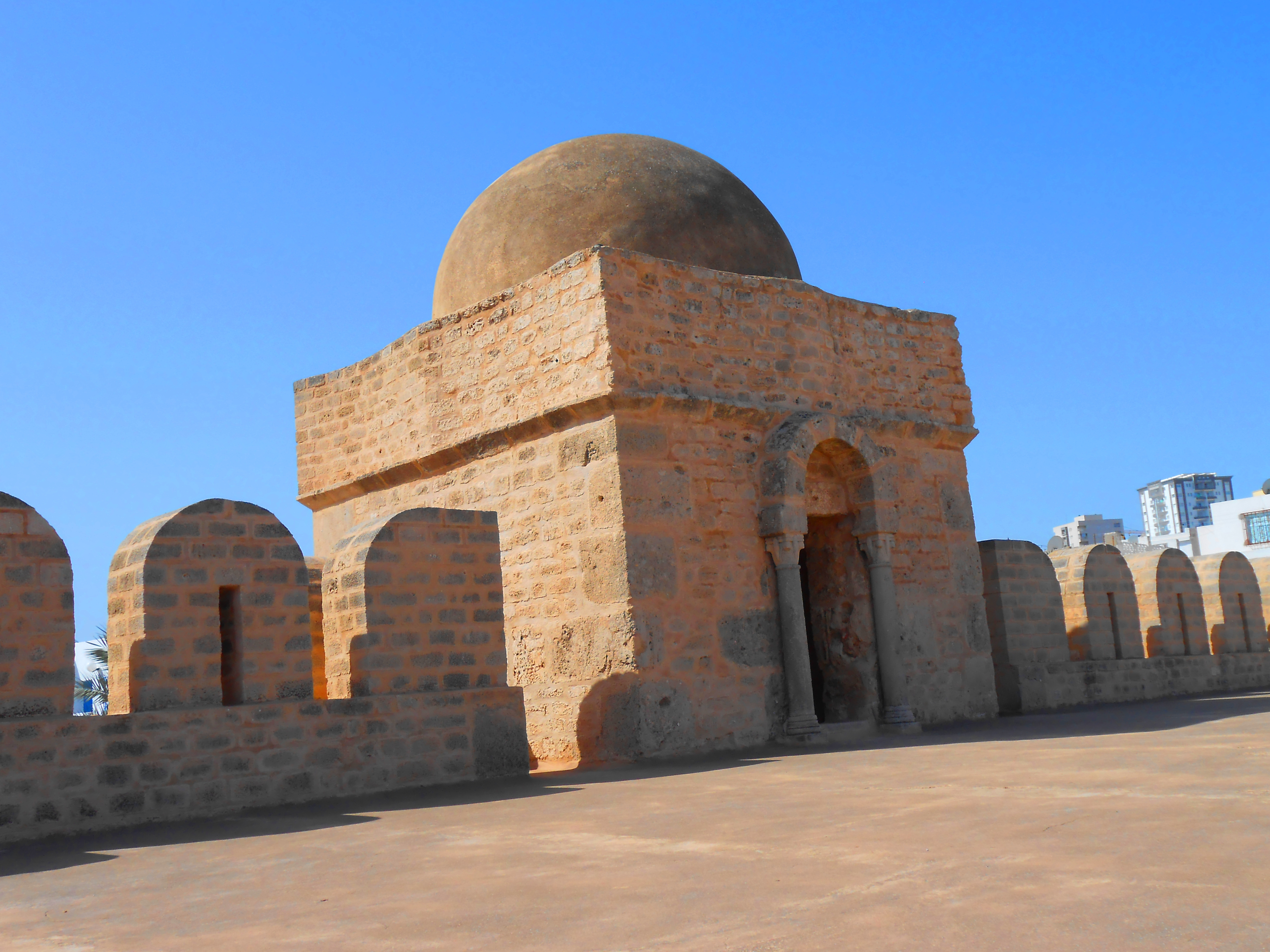
Domed chamber above the gate

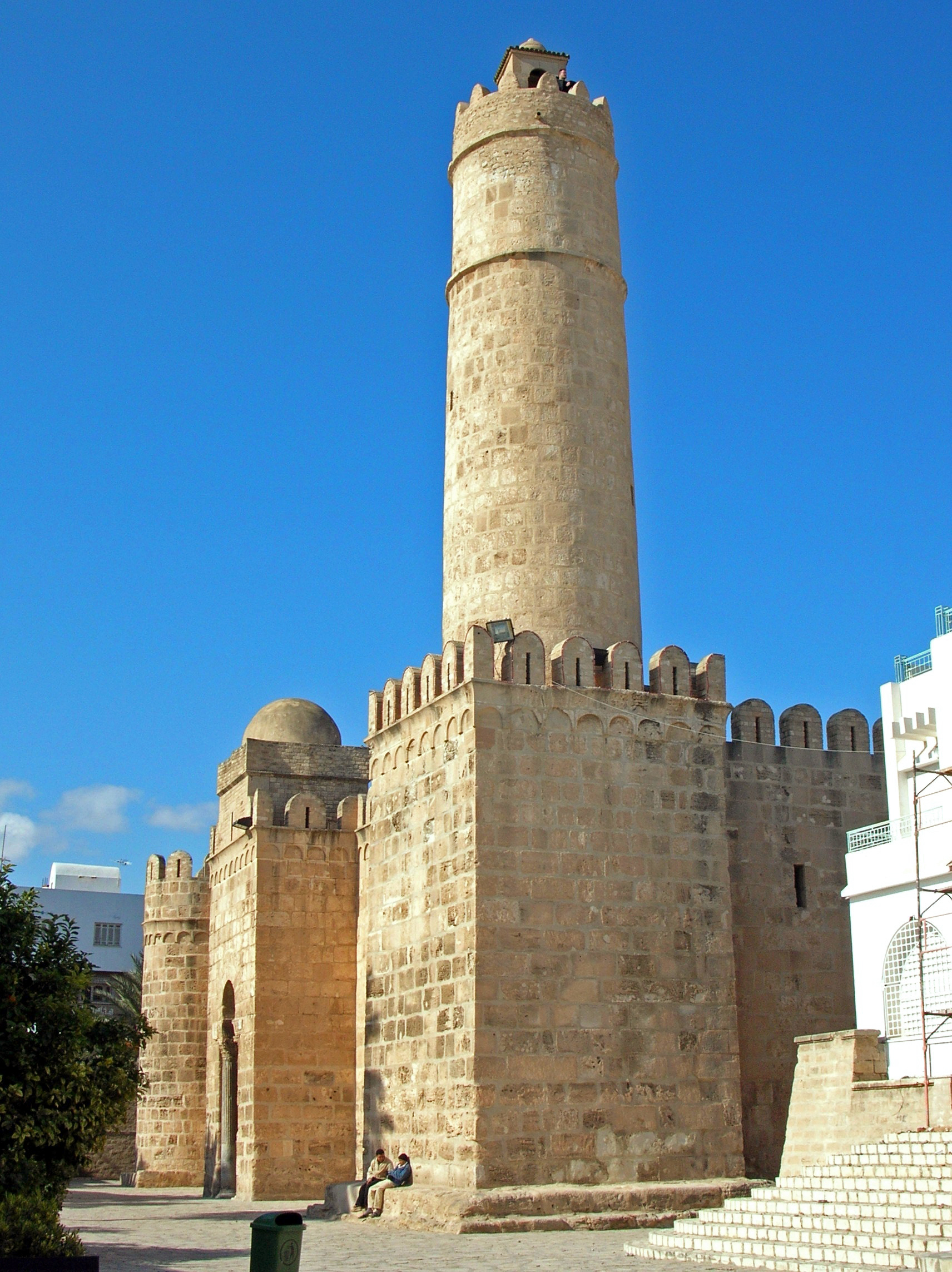
Tower (possible lighthouse) of the ribat
