= Medina of Sousse =

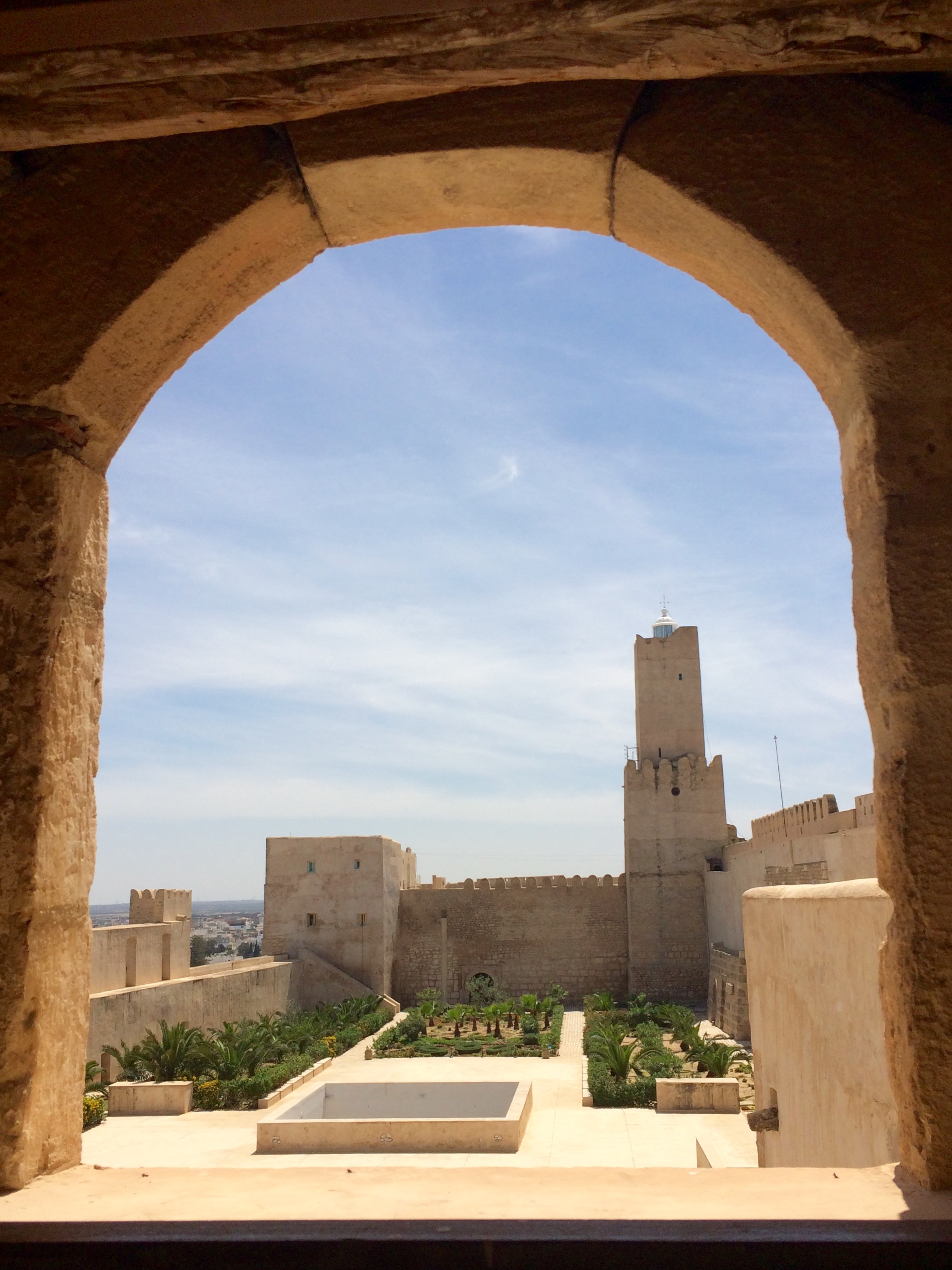
- The Medina, inside

- Location of the Medina
- 35°49′40″N 10°38′19″E
- Location: Sousse, Governorate of Sousse, Tunisia

History
- Built: Early centuries of Islam

Site notes
- Architectural style: Islamic

UNESCO World Heritage Site
- Official name: Medina of Sousse
- Type: Cultural
- Criteria: iii, iv, v
- Designated: 1988 (12th session)
- Reference no.
- Country: Tunisia
- Region: Arab States
- Extensions: 2008

The Medina of Sousse is a Medina quarter in Sousse, Governorate of Sousse, Tunisia. Designated by the UNESCO a World Heritage Site in 1988, it is a typical example of the architecture of the early centuries of Islam in Maghreb. It encompasses a Kasbah, fortifications and the Great Mosque of Sousse. The Medina today houses the Archaeological Museum of Sousse. A number of Punic steles were discovered in the Medina, between the Ribat and the Great Mosque, in the 19th and 20th centuries.

== History ==
The Medina of Sousse is located in the Tunisian Sahel and forms an outstanding archeological site. This was primarily because of the time it was built at the dawn of Islamic civilization, making it one of the earliest constructions after the Islamic conquests in the Maghreb. It was also because of the location of the Medina, a site that required protection against piracy and plunder.

The constructions comprised in its precincts witnessed the early post-conquest civilisations. Its architectural style, from the time of the Aghlabid, is representative of the military coastal constructions of the era, meant to be stout and imposing, so as to ward off foes.

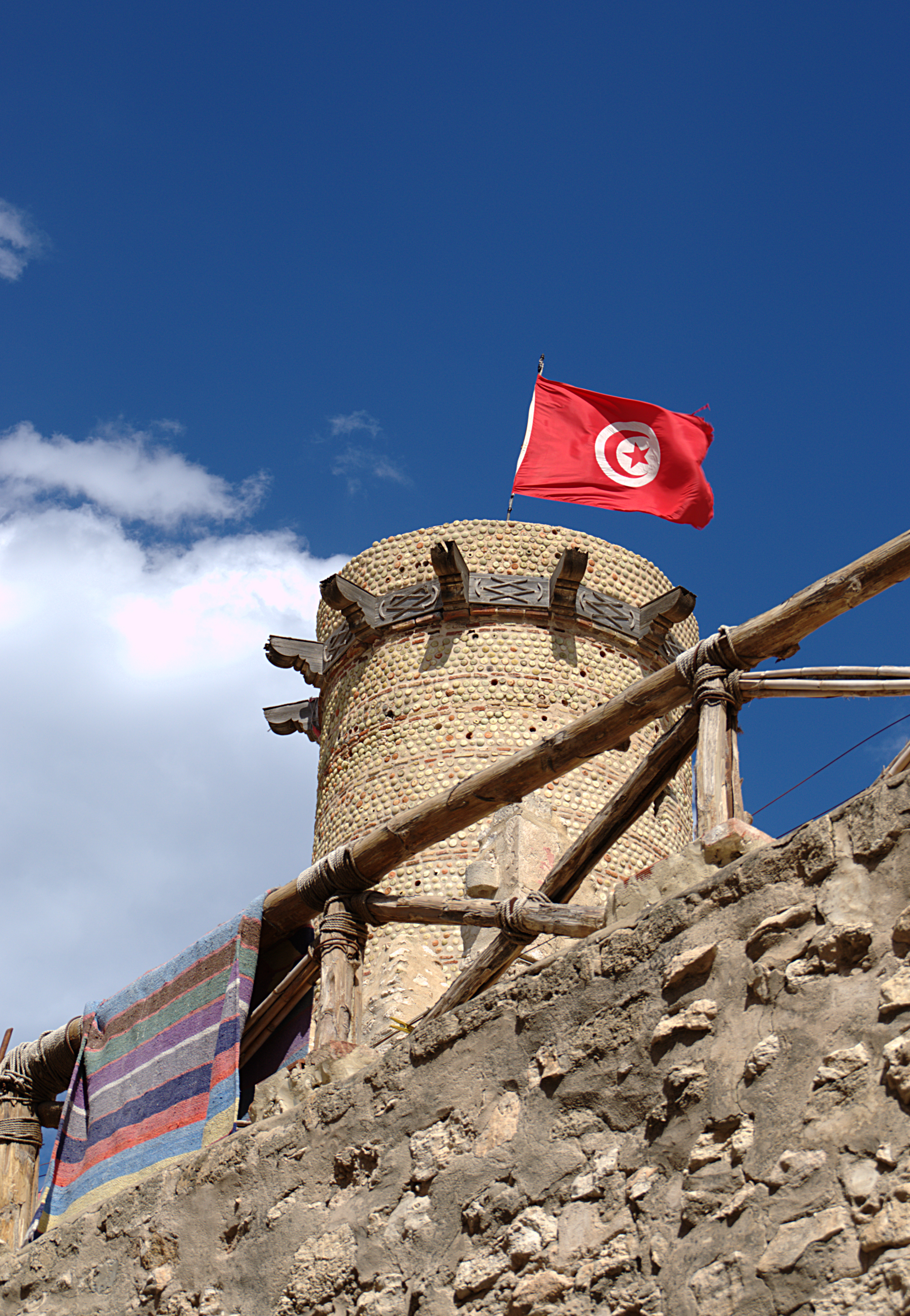
Tower of the Medina of Sousse

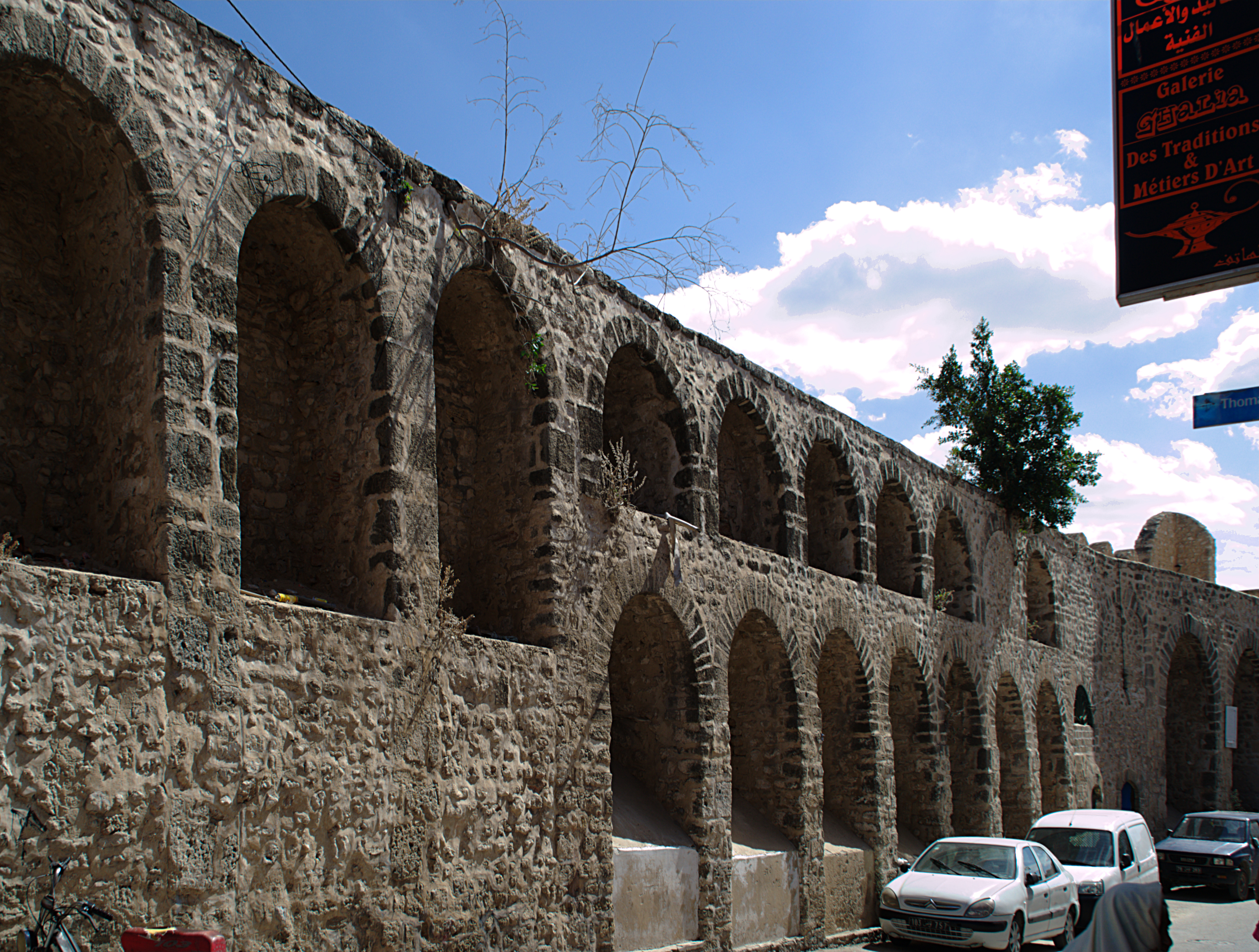
Wall of the Medina

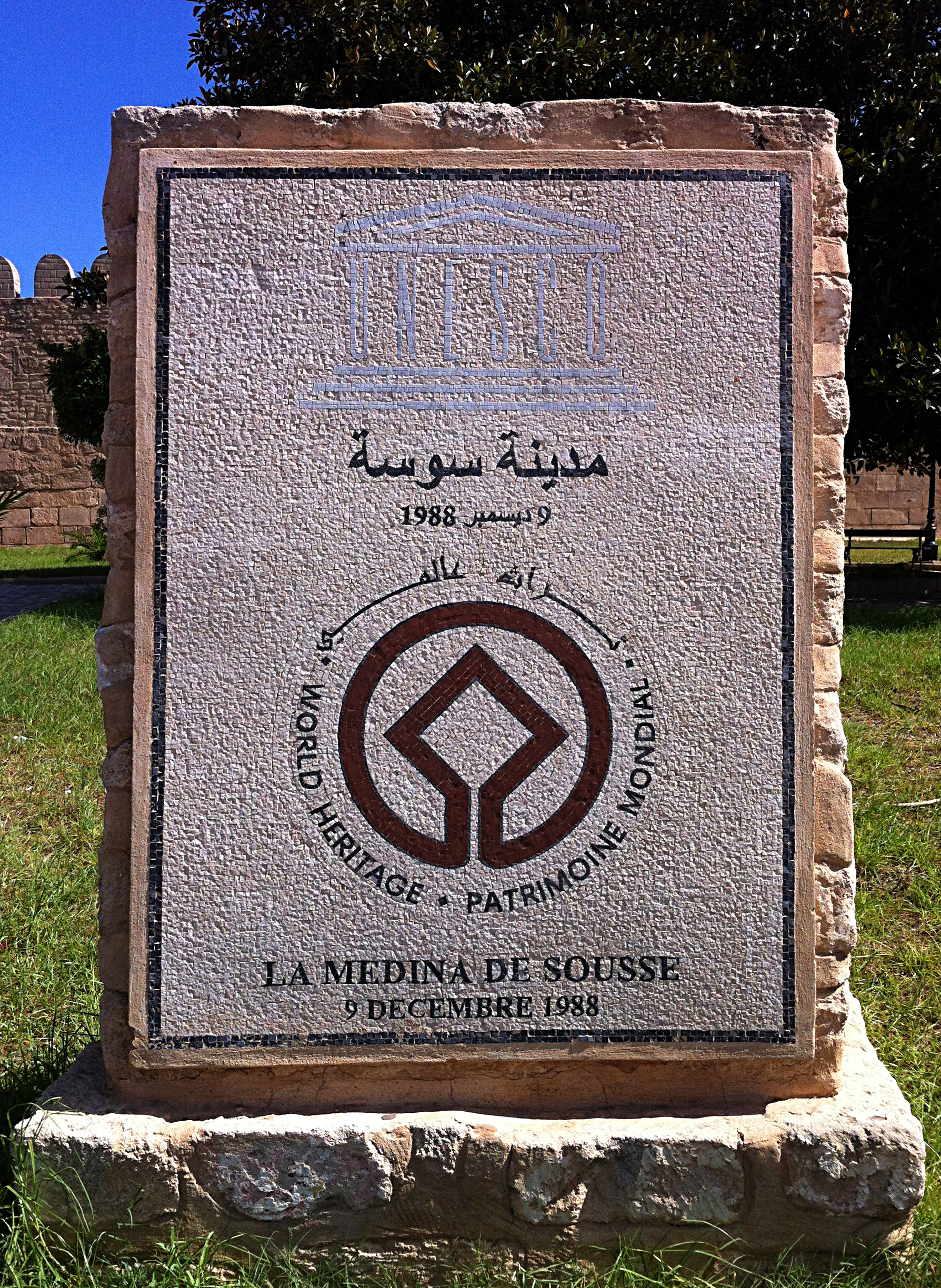
Medina of Sousse Sign of UNESCO World Heritage

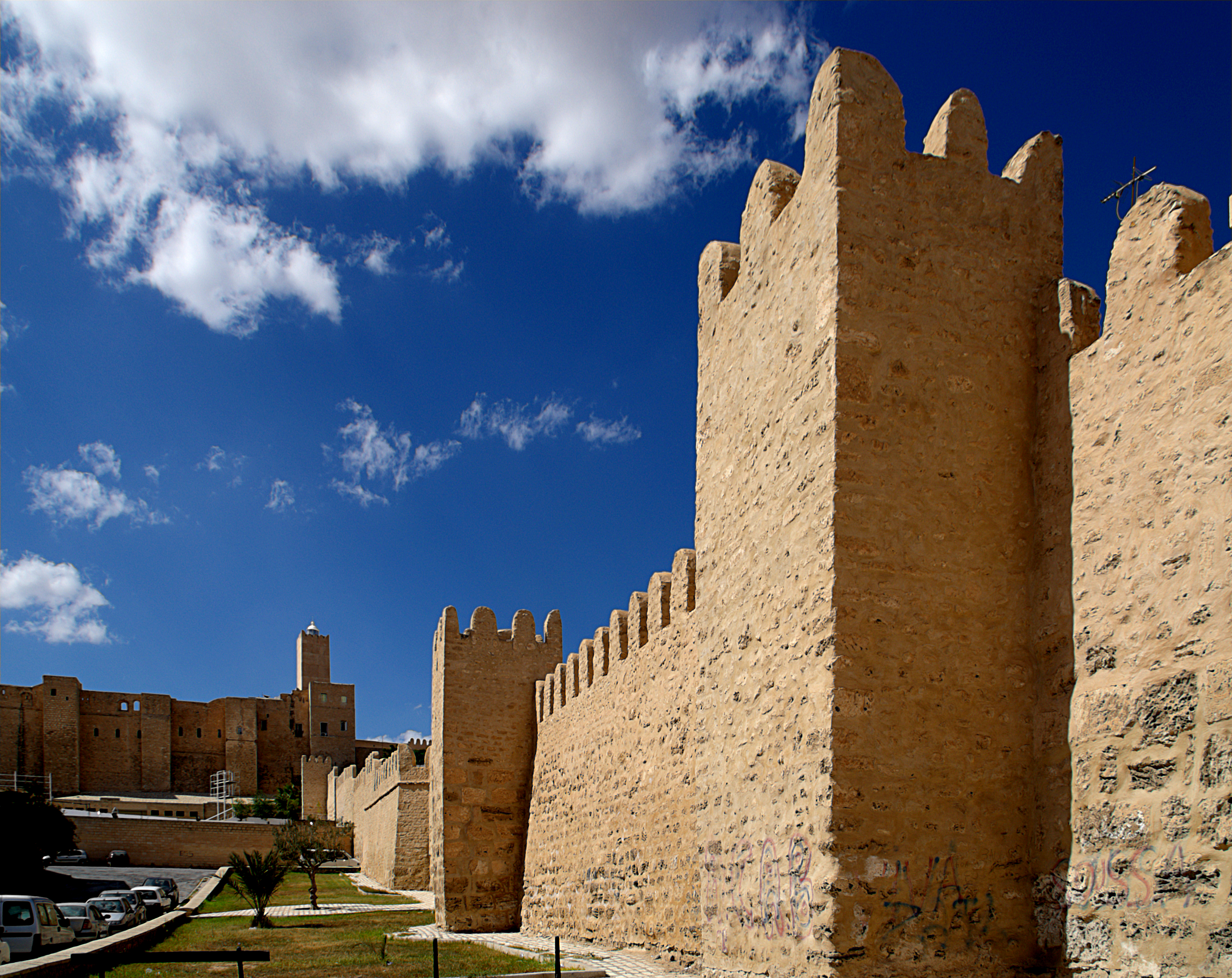
Walls of the Medina of Sousse

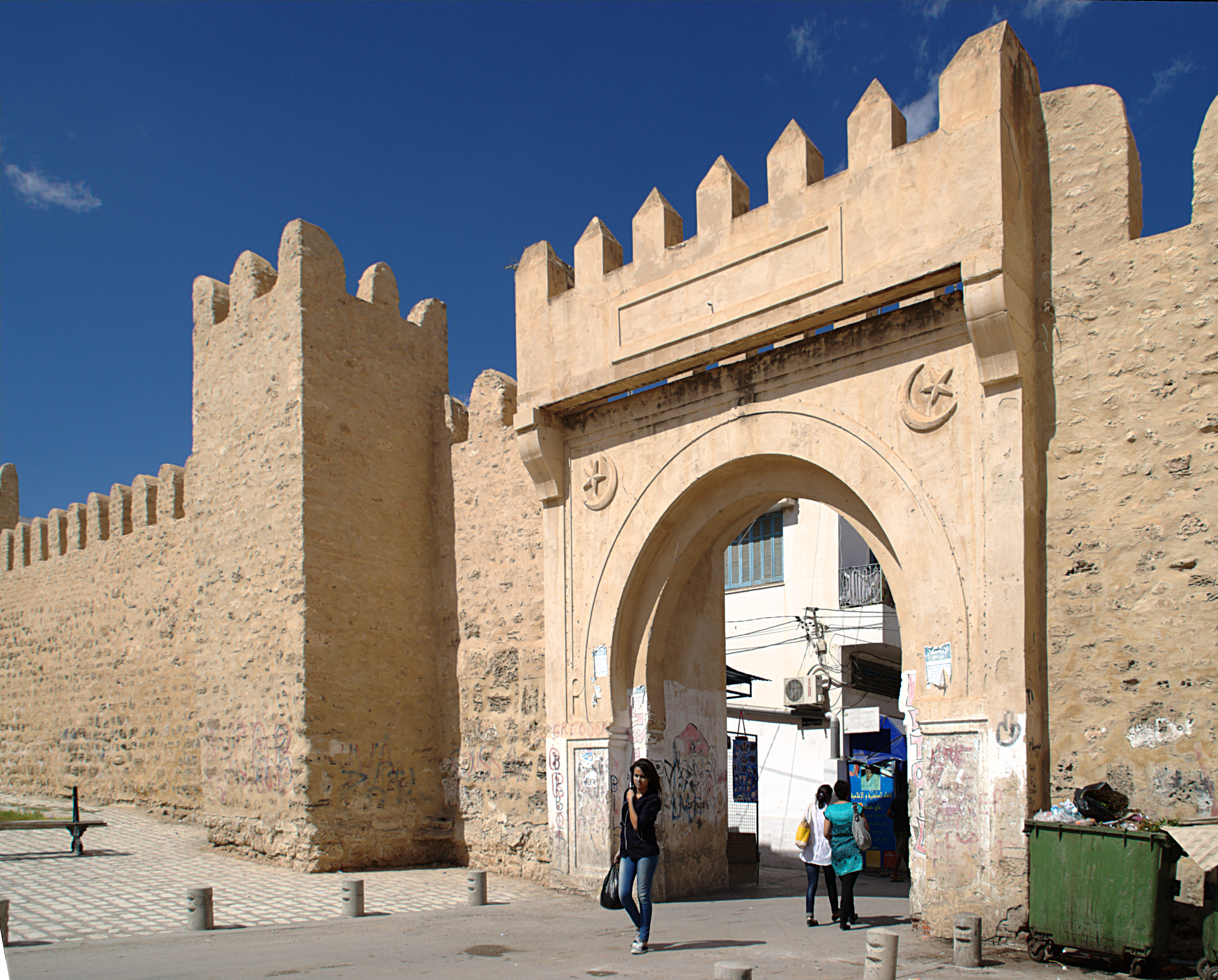
One of the gates of the Medina

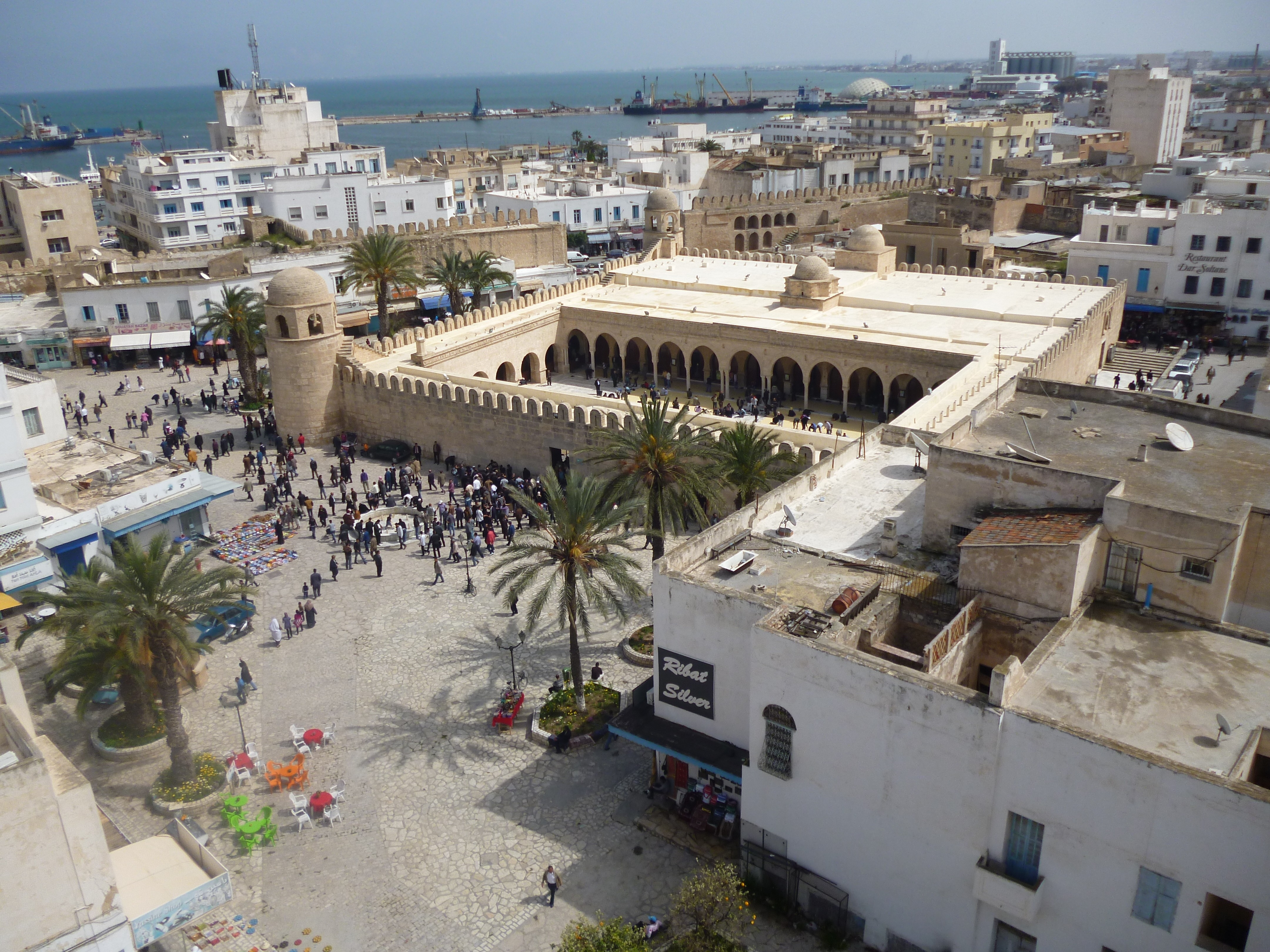
Mosque of the Medina of Sousse

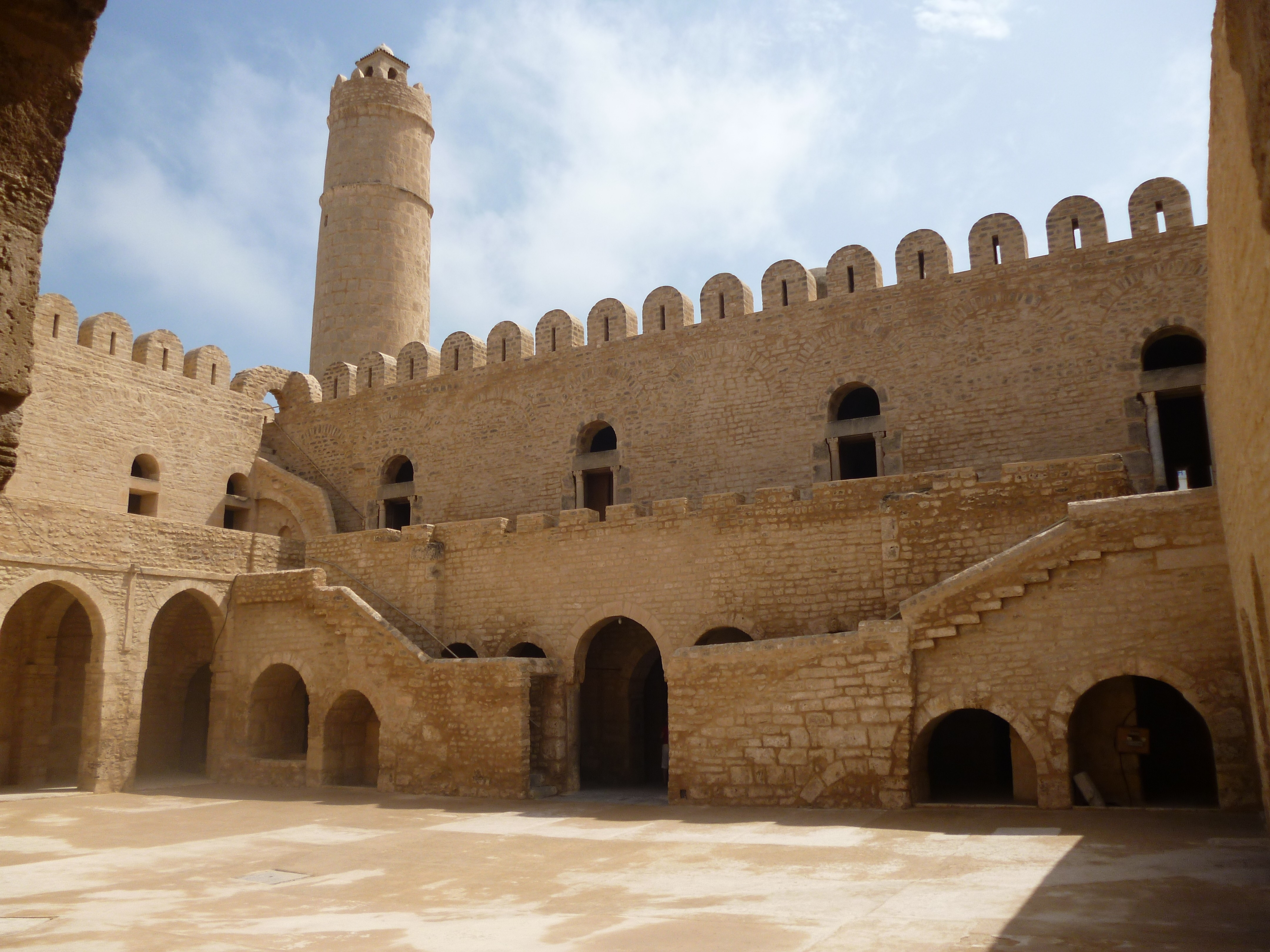
Ribat of the Medina of Sousse

== Climate change ==
As a coastal heritage site, Medina of Sousse is vulnerable to sea level rise. In 2022, the IPCC Sixth Assessment Report included it in the list of African cultural sites which would be threatened by flooding and coastal erosion by the end of the century, but only if climate change followed RCP 8.5, which is the scenario of high and continually increasing greenhouse gas emissions associated with the warming of over 4 °C., and is no longer considered very likely. The other, more plausible scenarios result in lower warming levels and consequently lower sea level rise: yet, sea levels would continue to increase for about 10,000 years under all of them. Even if the warming is limited to 1.5 °C, global sea level rise is still expected to exceed 2–3 m (7–10 ft) after 2000 years (and higher warming levels will see larger increases by then), consequently exceeding 2100 levels of sea level rise under RCP 8.5 (~0.75 m (2 ft) with a range of 0.5–1 m (2–3 ft)) well before the year 4000. This means that unless effective adaptation efforts such as sea walls can be constructed to deal with the sea level rise, damage and the potential destruction of Medina of Sousse is a matter of time.

== See also ==
- Zawiya of Sidi Bouraoui
