= Great Mosque of Sousse =

Mosque in Sousse, Tunisia

Great Mosque of Sousse الجامع الكبير بسوسة
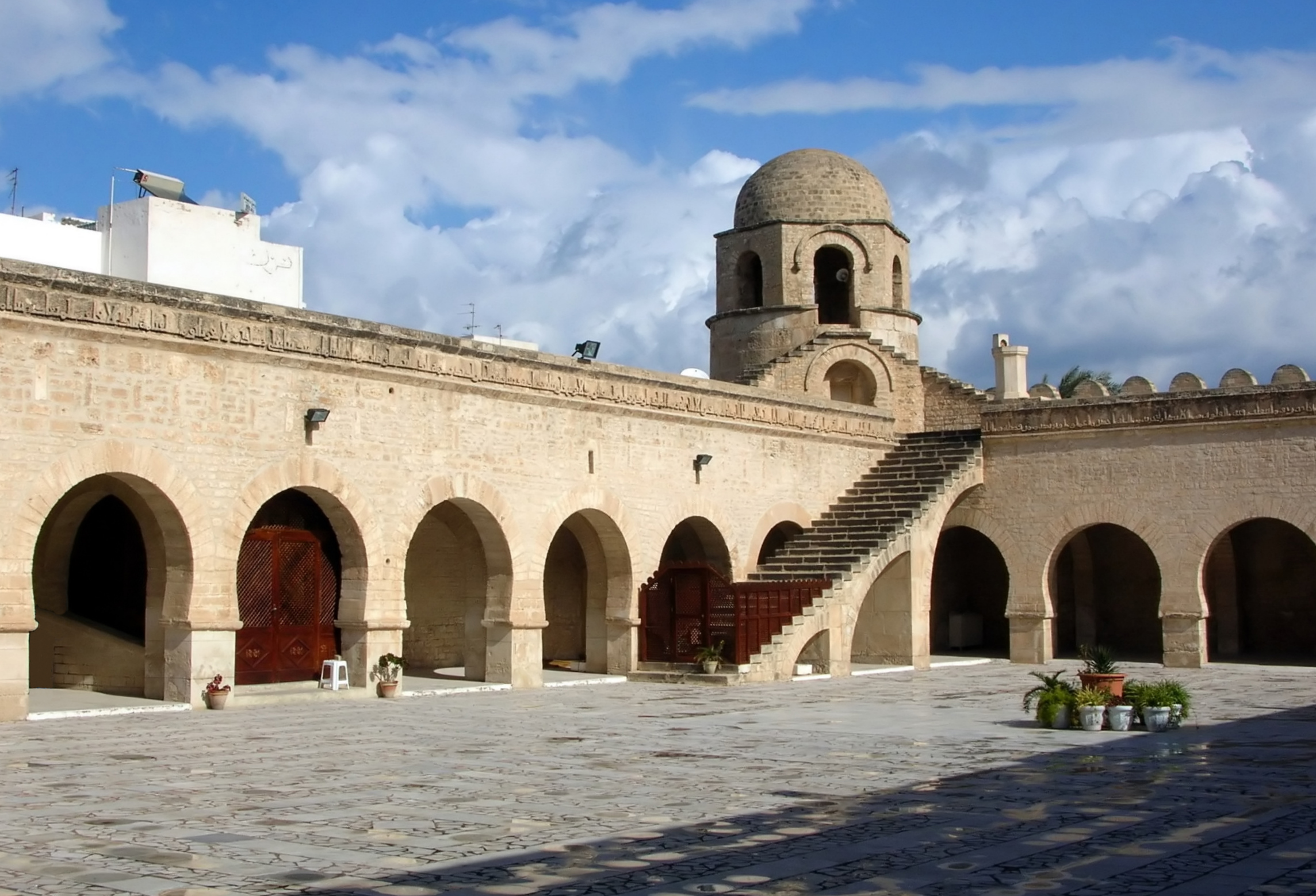
- View of the domed kiosk from the sahn

Religion
- Affiliation: Islam
- Region: North Africa
- Status: Active

Location
- Location: Sousse, Tunisia
- Interactive map of Great Mosque of Sousse الجامع الكبير بسوسة
- Coordinates: 35°49′37″N 10°38′23″E

Architecture
- Architect: Mudam al-Khadim
- Type: Mosque
- Style: Moorish (Aghlabid)
- Completed: 851

Specifications
- Length: 50 m (167 ft)
- Width: 57 m (190 ft)

The Great Mosque of Sousse (Arabic: الجامع الكبير بسوسة) is a historical mosque in the coastal city of Sousse, Tunisia. The construction dates back to 851, during the rule of the Aghlabid dynasty, vassals of the Abbasid Caliphate. It was commissioned by the ruler Abu al-‘Abbas Muhammad al-Aghlabi. It is a major monument of Aghlabid architecture in the early Islamic period. The mosque was renovated and its prayer hall expanded multiple times over the following centuries.

== History ==
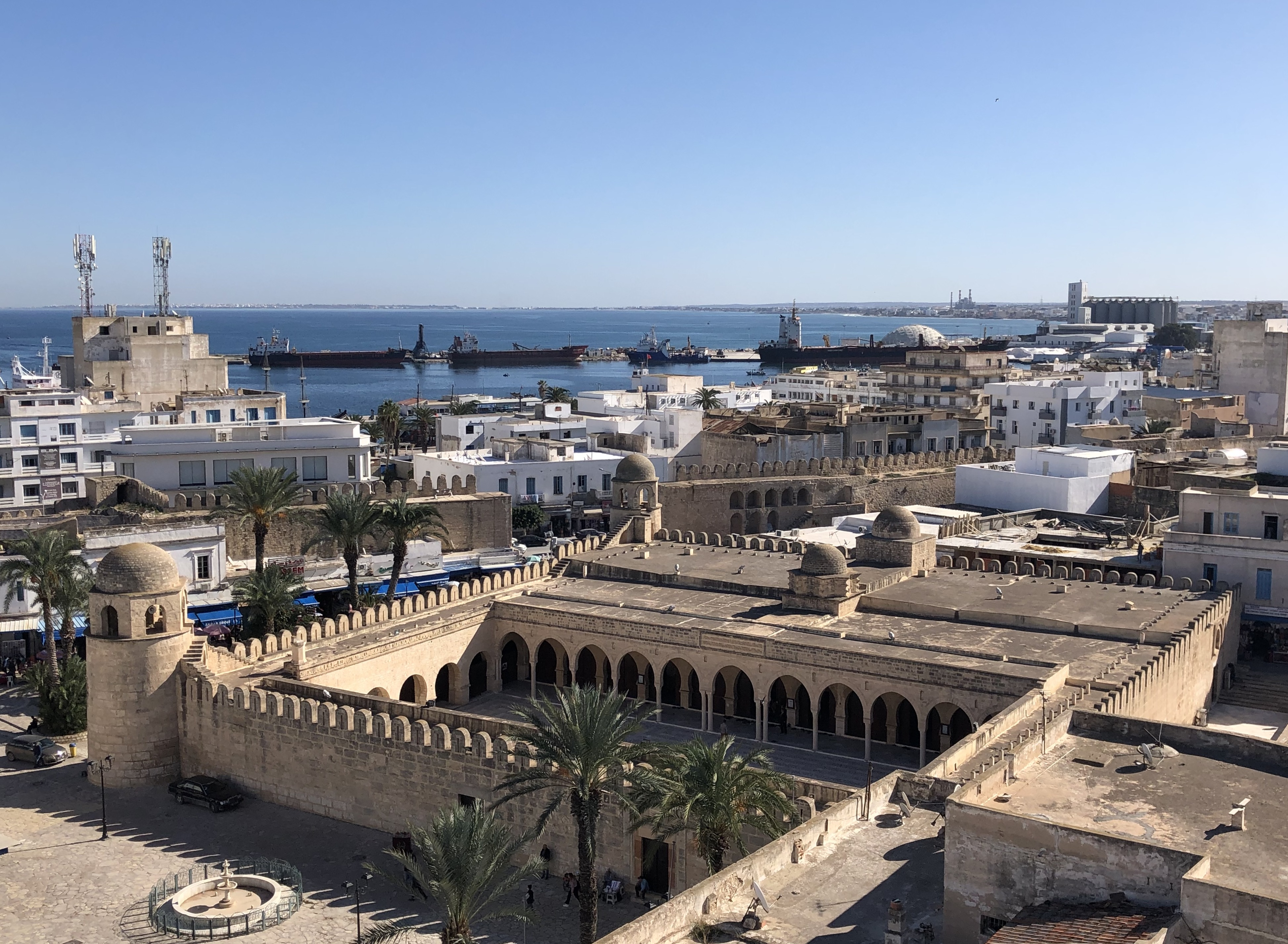
The Great Mosque, seen from the northwest

In the year 800 the Abbasid caliph Harun al-Rashid granted the governorship of Ifriqiya (roughly modern-day Tunisia) to Ibrahim ibn al-Aghlab, who founded the Aghlabid dynasty that ruled the region for the next century, nominally on behalf of their Abbasid overlords. The Aghlabids were major builders and a relatively large number of early Islamic monuments built under their patronage have survived. The oldest mosque in the city (and the oldest preserved Muslim prayer hall in North Africa) is in the nearby Ribat of Sousse, founded in the 8th century and modified or rebuilt in 821. As the city's population grew during the 9th century, the Ribat's mosque most likely became too small to serve the town's population, inciting the Aghlabid's sponsoring of a new congregational mosque for the community.

The Great Mosque of Sousse was commissioned by the Aghlabid amir (ruler) Abu'l-Abbas Muhammad I in 851. Its construction was supervised by Mudam al-Khadim, a freed slave and mawla of Abu'l-Abbas. The mosque's prayer hall was expanded southwards later in the same century. The portico in front of the prayer hall, on the south side of the courtyard, was added in the 11th century under the Zirid dynasty, who also restored or decorated the mihrab (niche in the southern wall symbolizing the qibla) and the domed tower-pavilion at the northeast corner. Another restoration took place in 1785, when the southern portico was renovated.

Since 1988, the mosque is a part of UNESCO World Heritage Site encompassing the Medina of Sousse.

== Architecture ==
The mosque has a rectangular floor plan measuring about 57 metres wide and 50 metres long (or 59 by 51 metres according to another source), divided between a courtyard and a prayer hall. While the floor plan is not very different from that of the Great Mosque of Kairouan, the structure of the building is very different. It is adjacent to the older Ribat of Sousse, which influenced the mosque's fortified appearance with crenellated walls and corner towers.

=== Courtyard ===
The mosque courtyard (sahn) measures 41 by 22.25 metres. A long Kufic Arabic inscription runs in a cornice along the top edge of the walls around the courtyard, containing mostly Qur'anic excerpts. On the south side of the courtyard the inscription is now hidden behind an extra arcaded portico that was added in the 11th century (and restored in 1675) in front of the prayer hall's original arcaded façade. At the mosque's northeast corner is a cylindrical bastion topped by a domed octagonal pavilion, which was likely a sawma'a, a space at roof level where the muezzin could issue the call to prayer, serving the function that minarets did in later periods. The domed kiosk itself dates from the 11th century, during the Zirid period.

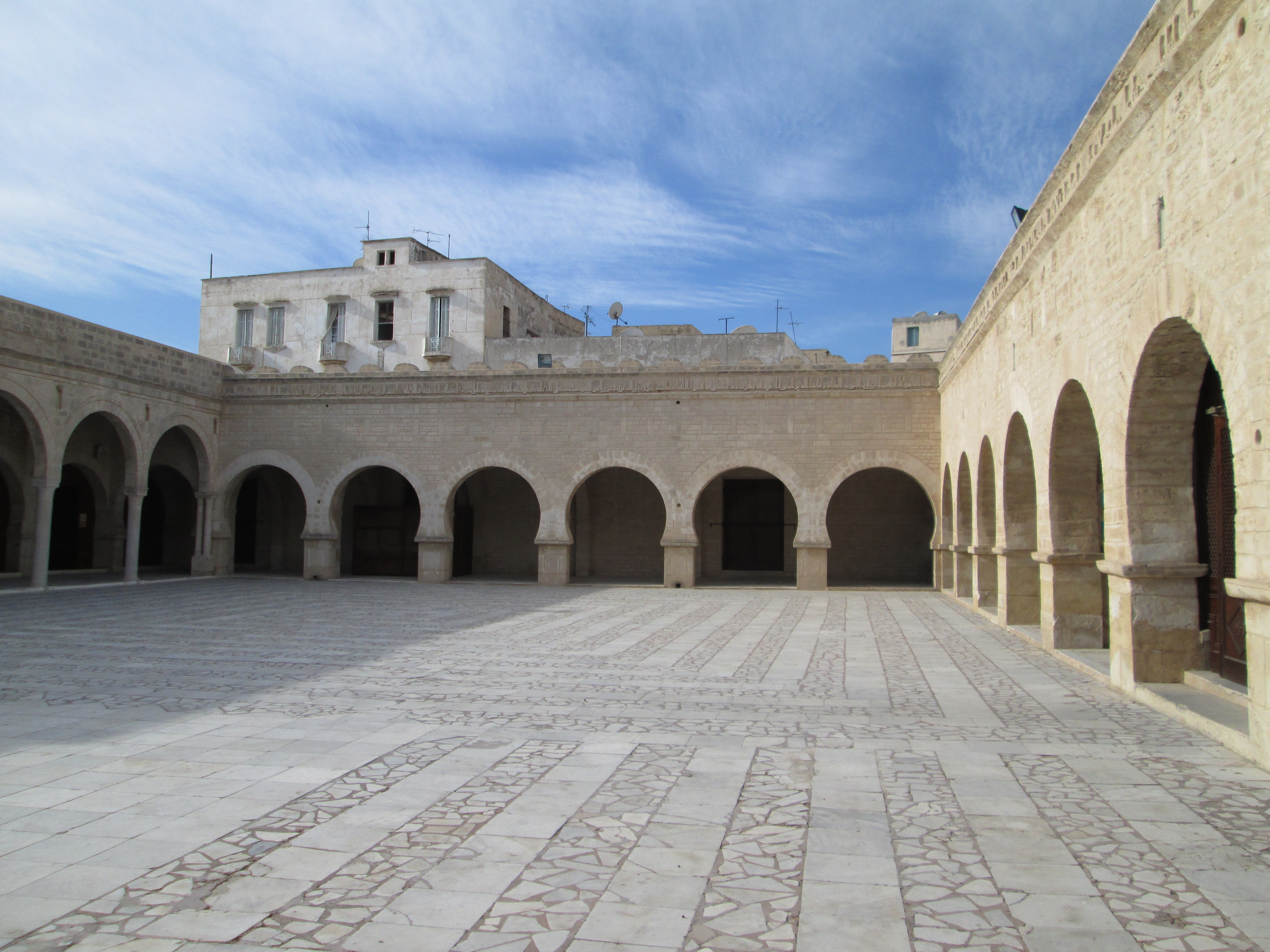
The courtyard (looking west)

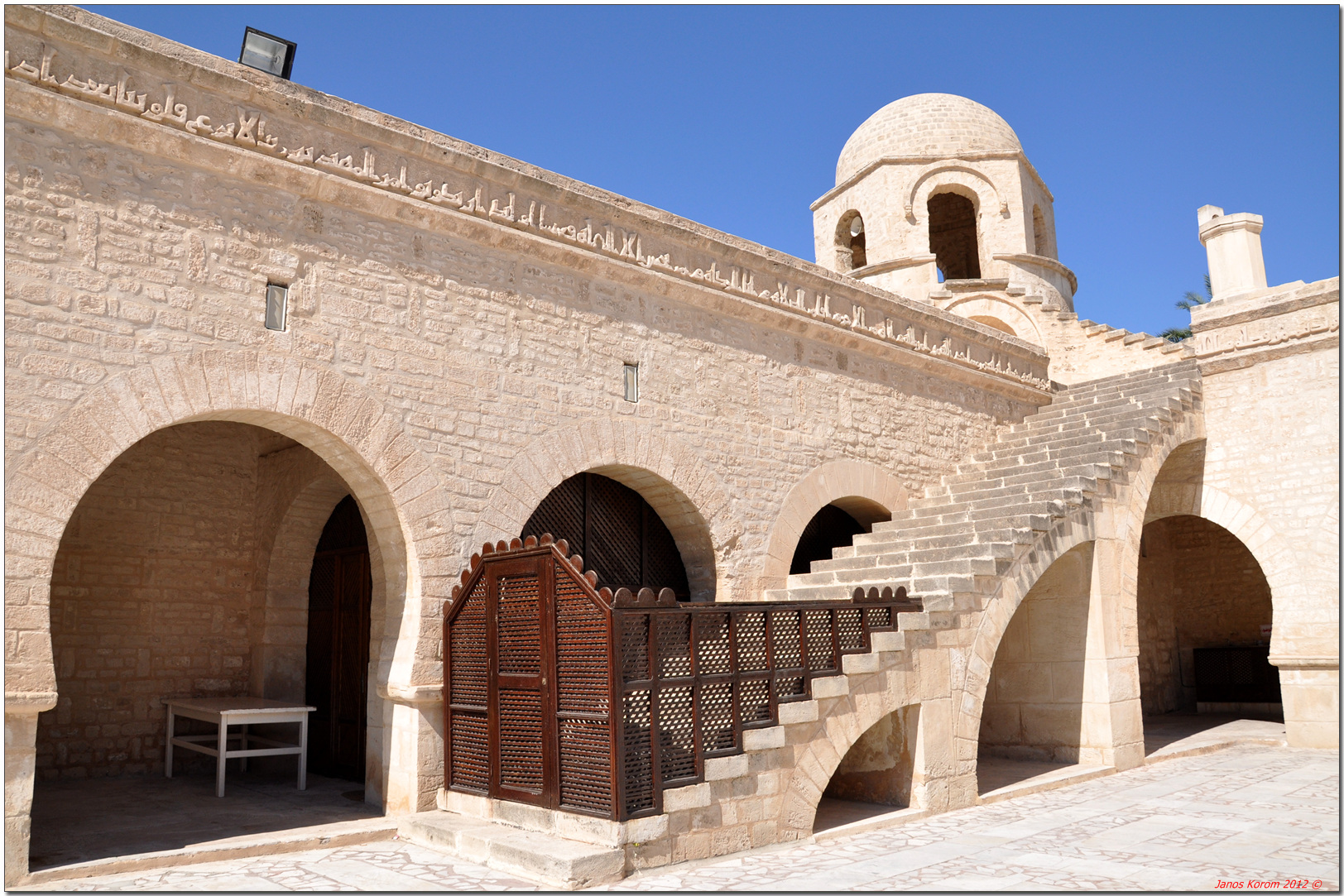
Stairs to the roof, with the Kufic inscription band visible along the top of the wall

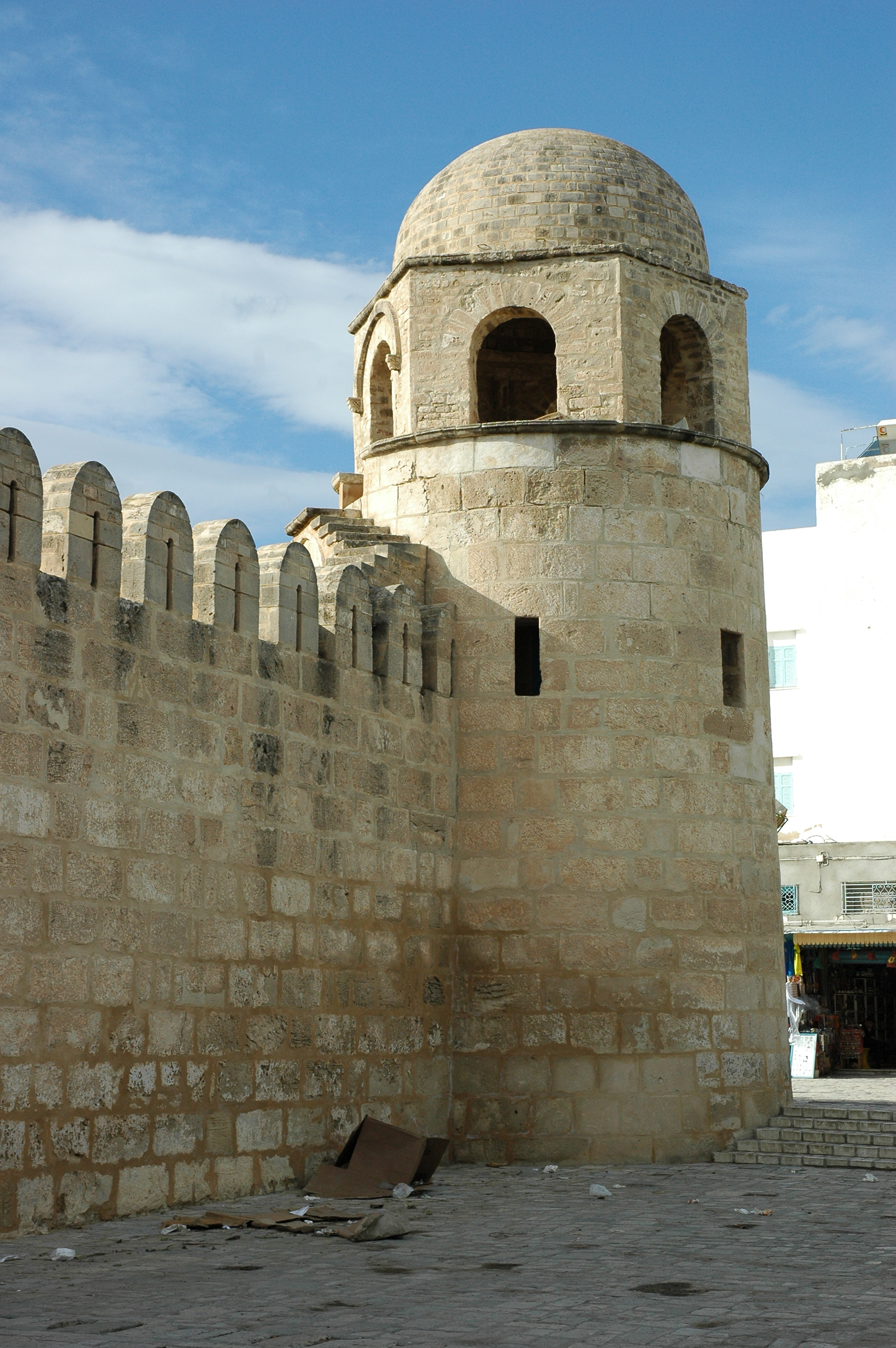
The domed northeast tower, seen from outside

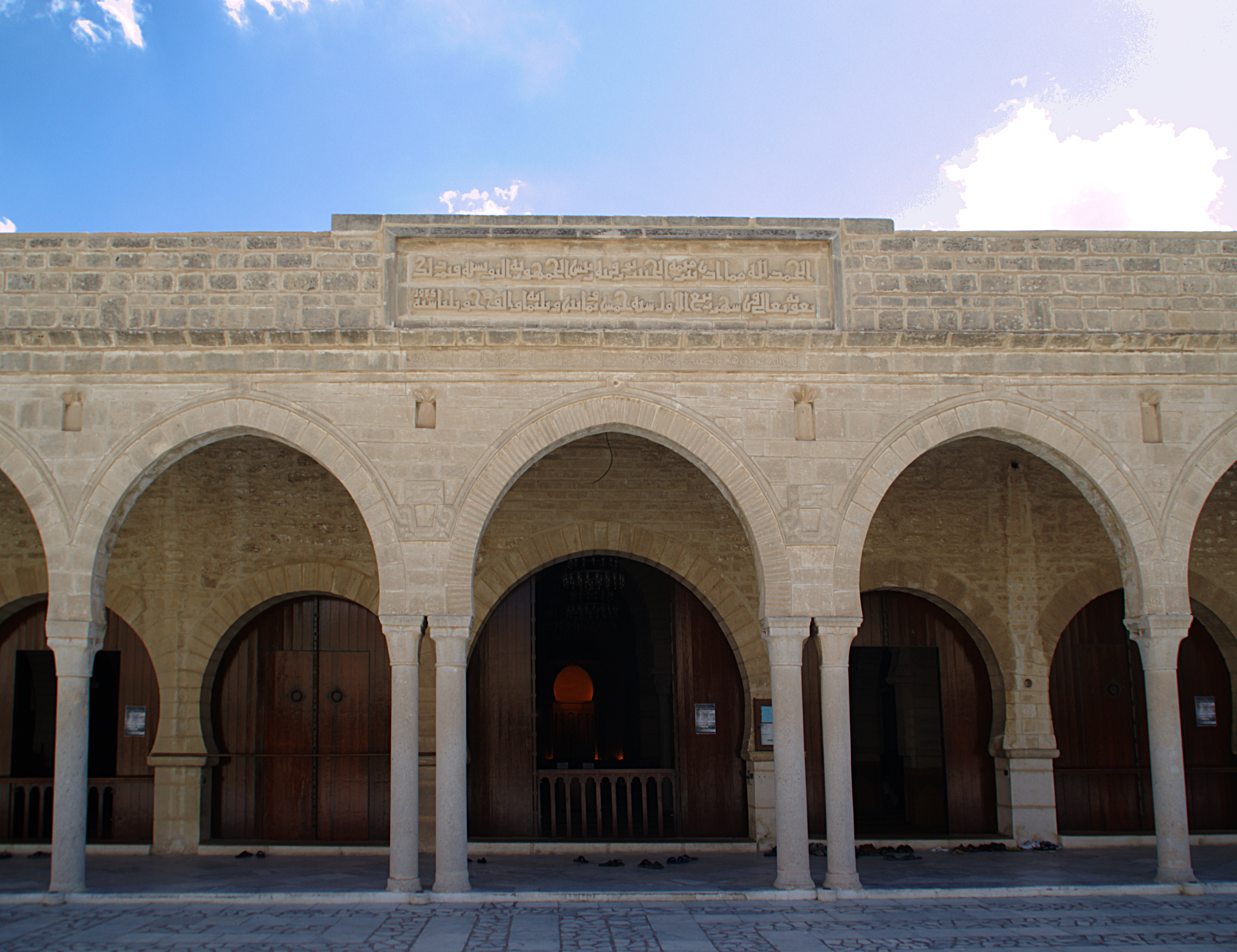
The façade of the prayer hall, south side of the courtyard

=== Prayer hall ===
The prayer hall has 13 naves separated by rows of horseshoe arches. The hall was originally three bays (three arches) deep, but it was subsequently extended by demolishing the qibla wall (southern wall) and extending it for the length of another three bays. The present mihrab dates from the Zirid period, judging by the style of its decorations and Kufic inscriptions. Rather than being covered by flat wooden ceilings, as with many other mosques of the region, the prayer hall is covered with rubble stone vaults. The hall's original bays are covered with barrel vaults while the bays of the later extension are covered by groin vaults. The dome in front of the original mihrab is still present, now in the middle of the prayer hall, and resembles the domes of the Great Mosque of Kairouan: it has an octagonal drum, scalloped squinches, a Kufic inscription, and carved floral decoration. The two tympanums of the arches on either side, below the dome, are covered in a carved checkerboard-like motif of lozenges filled with floral and rosette motifs. The dome is one of the few domes to be built in front of a mosque mihrab during the Umayyad and Abbasid periods, the others being at Al-Aqsa Mosque in Jerusalem (705) and at the Umayyad Mosque in Damascus (715).

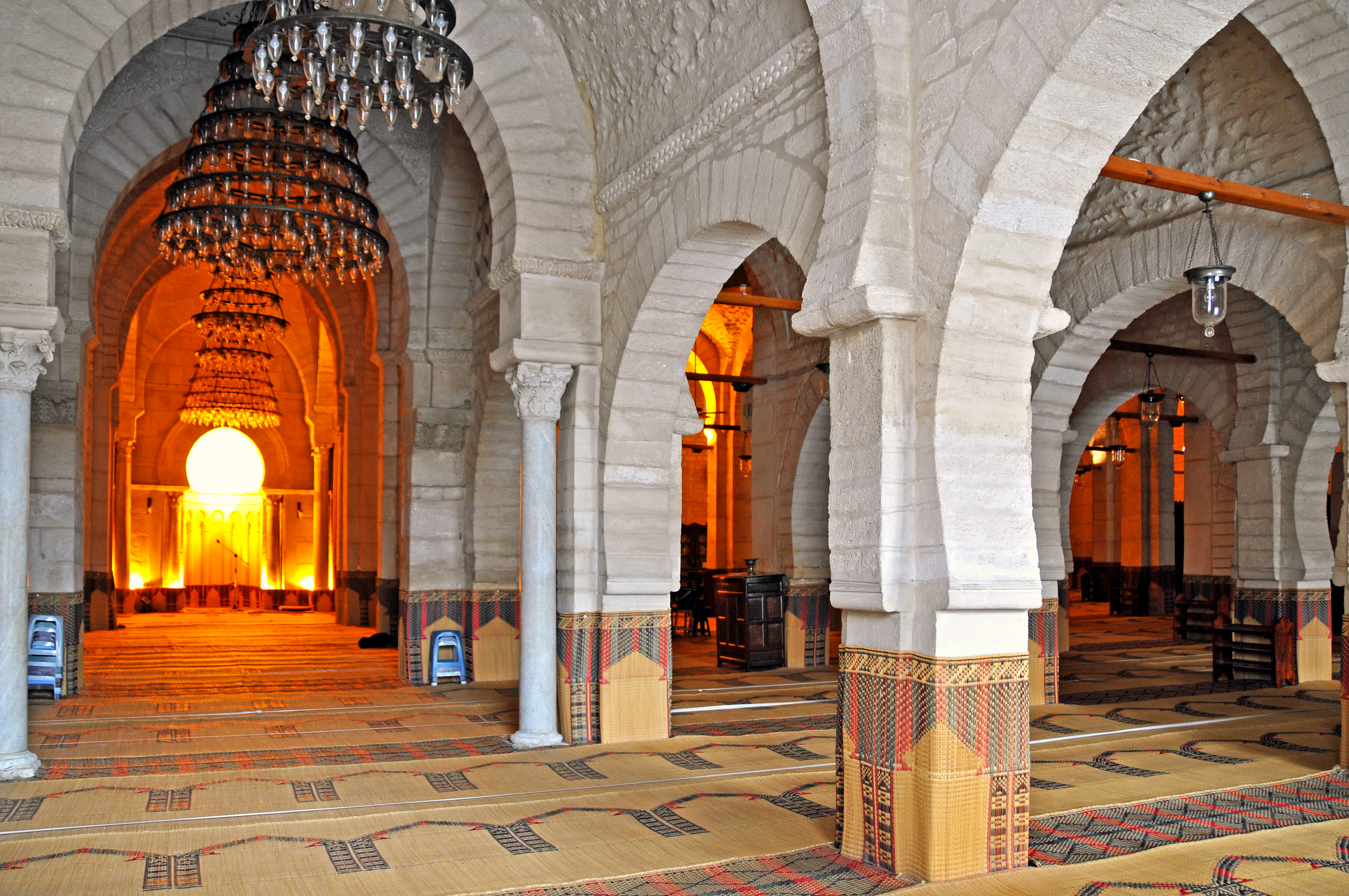
Prayer hall, with the central nave leading to the mihrab (left)

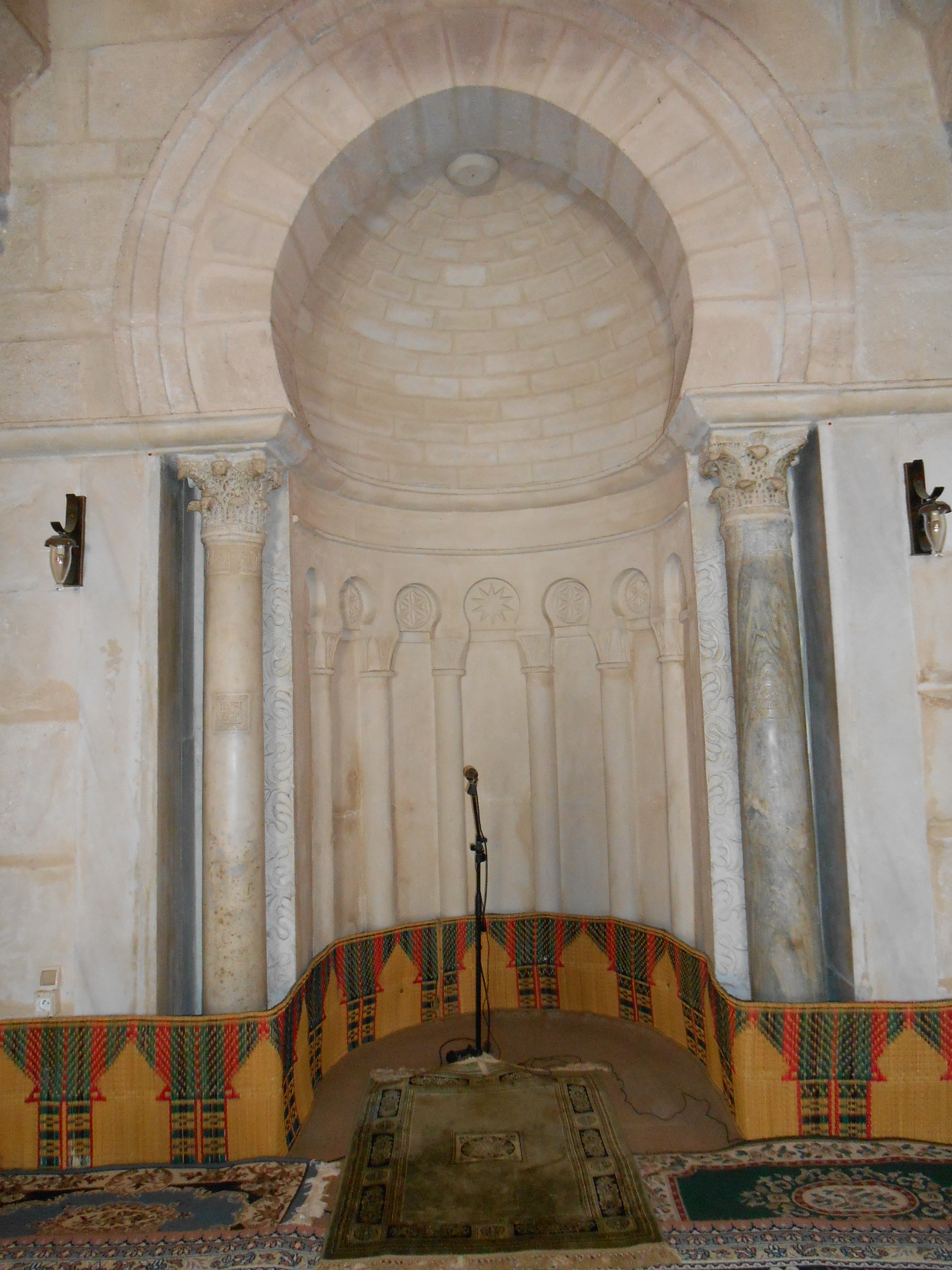
Mihrab of the mosque

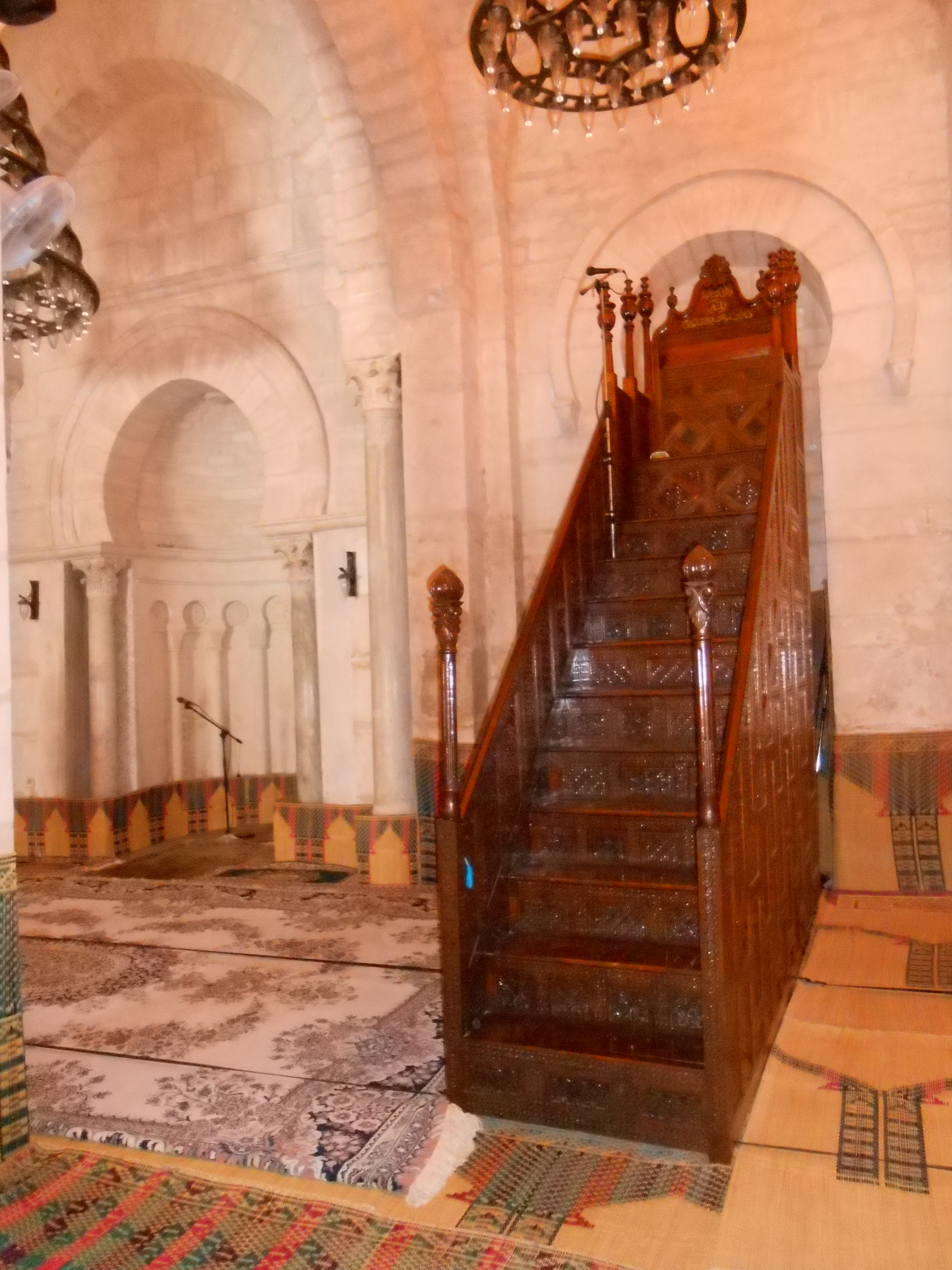
Minbar of the mosque, standing next to the mihrab

== See also ==
- List of the oldest mosques
- High medieval domes
