= Mosque of the Three Doors =

Mosque in Kairouan, Tunisia

- مسجد الأبواب الثلاثة
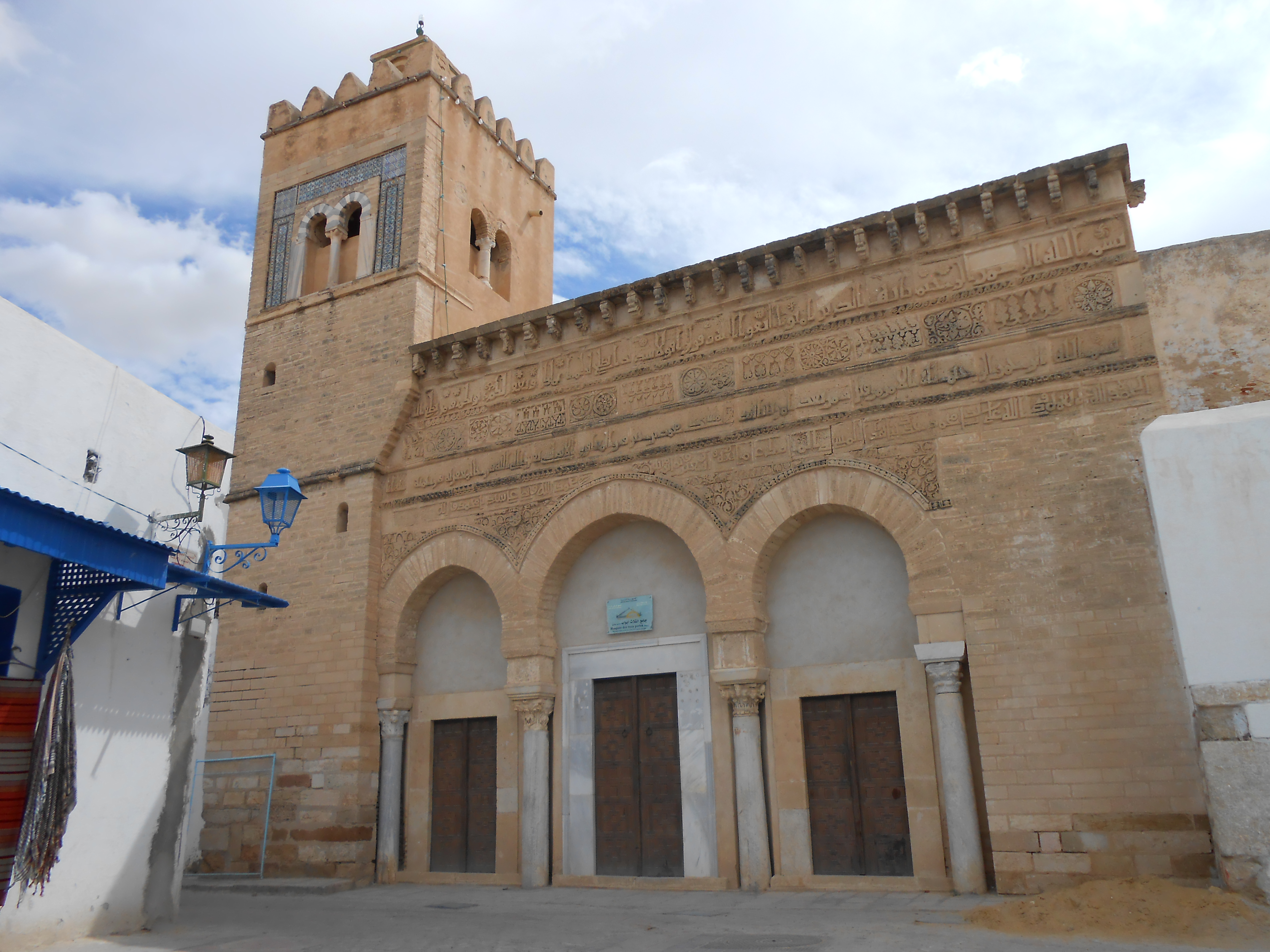

Religion
- Affiliation: Sunni Islam
- Ecclesiastical or organisational status: Mosque
- Status: Active

Location
- Location: Kairouan
- Country: Tunisia
- Interactive map of Mosque of the Three Doors
- Coordinates: 35°40′38.3″N 10°06′9.4″E

Architecture
- Type: Mosque
- Style: Moorish (Aghlabid, Hafsid)
- Founder: Muhammad ibn Khairun
- Completed: 866 (original); 1440 (minaret)
- Minaret: 1

The Mosque of the Three Doors or Mosque of Muhammad ibn Khairun (Note: In Arabic: مسجد الأبواب الثلاثة and مسجد ابن خيرون, respectively.) is a mosque located in the city of Kairouan, Tunisia.

Commissioned in 866 during the Aghlabid era by Muhammad ibn Khairun, a private local patron, the mosque is notable for being one of the earliest occurrences of a richly decorated external façade in Islamic architecture. The mosque was modified in later periods, notably with the addition of a minaret in 1440, during the Hafsid period.

== History ==
The mosque's construction is dated from 866 CE (252 AH) during the Aghlabid period. The foundation inscription on its façade records the name of its founder as Muhammad ibn Khayrun al-Ma'firi al-Andalusi, who was most likely a former slave from al-Andalus, and possibly a merchant. Only the mosque's front façade remains from the original construction. The minaret was added much later in 1440 CE (844 AH), during the Hafsid period, when the mosque was restored.

== Architecture ==
The architectural design of the Aghlabids can be characterized from the inheritance of the local architectural tradition and the simultaneous recognition of the Abbasid metropolitan styles and techniques. The mosque is fronted by three doors framed by horseshoe arches that resemble those of the Great Mosque of Uqba. The arches rest on reused ancient columns engaged into the wall. The façade above these arches is carved with floral motifs and with Arabic inscriptions written in Kufic script. This decorated façade is unique among the surviving monuments of this period. According to scholar Mourad Rammah, it is the oldest decorative façade in Islamic architecture.

The mosque contains a prayer hall with a slightly irregular but almost square floor plan with four columns dividing it into three naves or aisles, covered by a total of nine vaults. A basic mihrab niche is embedded in the qibla wall. On the northeast corner of the mosque is a square-based minaret, which is a later addition from the Hafsid era, with a design derived from Andalusi-Moorish architecture that had spread across the region during the Almohad period. The minaret's double-arched windows are framed with decorative tilework.

=== Inscriptions ===
The inscriptions on the mosque's façade are contained in three horizontal bands. The two upper bands contain two Qur'anic excerpts, Surah 33:71–72 and a fragment of Surah 30:4. The translated text reads:

Believers, be mindful of God, speak in a direct fashion and to good purpose, and He will put your deeds right for you and forgive you your sins. Whoever obeys God and His Messenger will truly achieve a great triumph. God is in command, first and last [...]

This is then followed by an inscription recording the mosque's foundation. The translated text reads:

The construction of this mosque was ordered by Muhammad, son of Khayrūn, al-Ma’āfirī, al-Andalusī, in order to draw closer to God and in the hopes of gaining His pardon and mercy.

The inscriptions on the façade were partially rearranged in the 15th century when the Hafsid minaret was added, so as to insert a new inscription along the lower band recording the restoration of 1440. The appearance of the original Aghlabid-period façade and inscriptions was reconstituted by Georges Marçais.

== See also ==
- Aghlabid architecture
- Islam in Tunisia
- List of mosques in Tunisia
