= Khaqani (disambiguation) =

Khaqani (c. 1120 – c. 1199) was a major Persian poet and prose writer.

Khaqani (Persian) or al-Khaqani (Arabic) may also refer to:

- Muhammad ibn Ubayd Allah al-Khaqani, Abbasid vizier in 912–913
- Abdallah ibn Muhammad al-Khaqani, Abbasid vizier in 924–925
- Abu Muzahim Musa ibn Ubayd Allah al-Khaqani (died 937), Islamic traditionist
- Mohammad-Taher Shubayr al-Khaqani (1911–1986), Iranian Arab cleric
- Mohammad Taher Khaqani (born 1940), Iranian cleric
- Khaqani Park, a park in Tabriz
- Khaqani Turkic, another name for the Karakhanid language

== See also ==
- Ibn Khaqan (disambiguation)
