= Fatimid invasion of Egypt =

Fatimid invasion of Egypt may refer to:

- Fatimid invasion of Egypt (914–915)
- Fatimid invasion of Egypt (919–921)
- Fatimid invasion of 935, repulsed by Muhammad ibn Tughj
- Fatimid conquest of Egypt (969)
