= Fatimid conquest of Egypt =

Part of the Fatimid Caliphate's expansion in 969–970

- Part of the Fatimid Caliphate's expansion
Date	6 February – 9 July 969
Location	Fustat, Egypt 30°00′N 31°14′E
Result	Fatimid victory: Fall of Ikhshidid dynasty; Capitulation of Fustat and Egypt; Foundation of Cairo and move of the Fatimid Caliphate's seat from Ifriqiya to Egypt; Beginning of Fatimid expansion into the Levant and the Hejaz

Belligerents
Fatimid Caliphate	Ikhshidid dynasty

Commanders and leaders
Caliph al-Mu'izz li-Din Allah; Jawhar; Ja'far ibn Fallah; Abu Ja'far Ahmad ibn Nasr	Emir Abu'l-Fawaris Ahmad ibn Ali (POW); Ja'far ibn al-Furat; Nihrir al-Shuwayzan
- Location of Fustat in Egypt

Troops of the Fatimid Caliphate under the general Jawhar captured Egypt, then ruled by the autonomous Ikhshidid dynasty in the name of the Abbasid Caliphate, in 969.

The Fatimids launched repeated invasions of Egypt soon after coming to power in Ifriqiya (modern Tunisia and eastern Algeria) in 909, but failed against the still-strong Abbasid Caliphate. By the 960s, however, while the Fatimids had consolidated their rule and grown stronger, the Abbasid Caliphate had collapsed, and the Ikhshidid regime was facing prolonged crisis: foreign raids and a severe famine were compounded by the death in 968 of the strongman Abu al-Misk Kafur. The resulting power vacuum led to open infighting among the various factions in Fustat, the capital of Egypt. The atmosphere of crisis was deepened by the simultaneous advances of the Byzantine Empire against the Muslim states of the Eastern Mediterranean. Meanwhile, Fatimid agents operated openly in Egypt, and the local elites increasingly came to accept and even welcome the prospect of a Fatimid takeover in hopes of ending the instability and insecurity.

Faced with this favourable situation, the Fatimid caliph al-Mu'izz li-Din Allah organized a large expedition to conquer Egypt. Led by Jawhar, the expedition set off from Raqqada in Ifriqiya on 6 February 969, and entered the Nile Delta two months later. The Ikhshidid elites preferred to negotiate a peaceful surrender, and Jawhar issued a writ of safe-conduct (amān), promising to respect the rights of the Egyptian notables and populace and take up the jihād against the Byzantines. The Fatimid army overcame the attempts of the Ikhshidid soldiery to prevent its crossing of the Nile river between 29 June and 3 July, while in the chaos pro-Fatimid agents took control of Fustat and declared its submission to al-Mu'izz. Jawhar renewed his amān and took possession of the city on 6 July, with the Friday prayer read in the name of al-Mu'izz on 9 July.

For the next four years Jawhar served as viceroy of Egypt, quelling rebellions and beginning the construction of a new capital, Cairo. His attempts to expand into the former Ikhshidid domains in Syria, and even attack the Byzantines, backfired: after swift initial progress, the Fatimid armies were destroyed, and Egypt itself faced a Qarmatian invasion that was fought off just north of Cairo. Al-Mu'izz arrived in Egypt in 973, and took up residence in Cairo, which became the seat of the Fatimid Caliphate for the remainder of its existence, until the abolition of the Fatimid regime by Saladin in 1171.

== Background: initial Fatimid attempts to capture Egypt ==
The Fatimid dynasty came to power in Ifriqiya (modern Tunisia and northeastern Algeria) in 909. The Fatimids had fled their home in Syria a few years before, and made for the Maghreb, where their agents had made considerable headway in converting the Kutama Berbers to the Fatimid-sponsored Isma'ili branch of Shi'a Islam. While the Fatimids remained hidden, the Isma'ili missionary Abu Abdallah al-Shi'i led the Kutama to overthrow the reigning Aghlabid dynasty, allowing the Fatimid leader to reveal himself publicly and declare himself caliph with the regnal name of al-Mahdi Billah (r. 909–934). In contrast to their predecessors, who were content to remain a regional dynasty on the western fringes of the Abbasid Caliphate, the Fatimids held ecumenical pretensions: claiming descent from Fatima, the daughter of Muhammad and wife of Ali, the Fatimid caliphs were simultaneously the leaders of the Isma'ili sect, whose followers accorded them semi-divine status as imams, the lawful vicegerents of God on earth. Consequently, the Fatimids regarded their rise to power as the first step in the restoration of their rightful place as leaders of the entire Muslim world against the usurping, pro-Sunni Abbasids, whom they were determined to overthrow and replace.

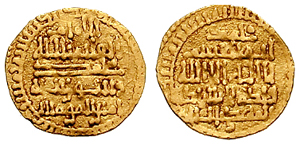
Gold dinar of the second Fatimid caliph, al-Qa'im bi-Amr Allah. As heir-apparent to his father, he led the first two, failed, Fatimid invasions of Egypt.

In line with this imperial vision, following the establishment of their rule in Ifriqiya, the next objective was Egypt, the gateway to the Levant and Iraq, the seat of their Abbasid rivals. In 914, a first invasion under the Fatimid heir-apparent al-Qa'im bi-Amr Allah was launched eastwards. It captured Cyrenaica (Barqa), Alexandria and the Fayyum Oasis, but failed to take the Egyptian capital, Fustat, and was driven back in 915, following the arrival of Abbasid reinforcements from Syria and Iraq. A second invasion was undertaken in 919–921. Alexandria was again captured, but the Fatimids were repelled in front of Fustat and their navy was destroyed. Al-Qa'im moved to the Fayyum Oasis, but was forced to abandon it in the face of fresh Abbasid troops and to retreat over the desert to Ifriqiya.

The failure of these early invasion attempts was chiefly due to the overextension of Fatimid logistics, and the concomitant failure to achieve decisive success before the arrival of Abbasid reinforcements. Nevertheless, Barqa was left in Fatimid hands as a forward base from which to threaten Egypt. As the Abbasid Caliphate entered a severe and general crisis in the 930s, the Fatimids once more tried to take advantage of the ensuing conflicts between the military factions in Egypt in 935–936. Fatimid forces briefly occupied Alexandria, but the actual victor of this affair was Muhammad ibn Tughj al-Ikhshid, a Turkish commander who established himself as the ruler of Egypt and southern Syria—ostensibly on the Abbasids' behalf but for all practical purposes independent—and founded the Ikhshidid dynasty. During his subsequent disputes with Baghdad, al-Ikhshid did not hesitate to seek Fatimid support, even suggesting a marriage alliance between one of his sons and a daughter of al-Qa'im, but after the Abbasid court recognized his rule and titles, he dropped this proposal.

On the Fatimid side, by the late 930s the initial revolutionary élan that had brought the Fatimids to power had faded, and although the claims to universal sovereignty were not forgotten, they were put on hold due to the outbreak of the large-scale revolt of the Khariji Berber preacher Abu Yazid (943–947). This rebellion almost brought the Fatimid regime to collapse, and even after its suppression, the Fatimids were for some time preoccupied with restoring their position in the western Mediterranean. During this time, Egypt was left in relative peace. Following the death of al-Ikhshid in 946, power passed to the strongman Abu al-Misk Kafur, a black eunuch slave whom al-Ikhshid had appointed as commander-in-chief of the army. For twenty years, Kafur was content to be the power behind the throne, as al-Ikhshid's sons ruled as emirs, but in 966 he assumed the throne in his own right.

== Changing circumstances: Egypt in the 960s ==
During the second third of the 10th century, the balance of power shifted in the Fatimids' favour: while the Fatimids consolidated their regime, the Abbasid Caliphate was weakened by constant power struggles between rival bureaucratic, courtly, and military factions. Gradually deprived of its outlying provinces by ambitious local dynasts and reduced to Iraq, after 946, the Abbasid caliphs themselves were reduced to powerless pawns of the Buyids.

By the 960s, the Ikhshidids were also facing a crisis, a combination of domestic tensions and external pressures. The Christian Nubian kingdom of Makuria launched invasions of Egypt from the south, while in the west, the Lawata Berbers occupied the region around Alexandria, and allied themselves with local Bedouin tribes of the Western Desert to confront the Ikhshidid troops. In Syria, increasing Bedouin restiveness challenged Ikhshidid rule, especially as it coincided with an invasion of Syria by the Qarmatians, an Isma'ili sect based in Bahrayn (Eastern Arabia). (Note: Although originating in the same secret Isma'ili movement that eventually gave birth to the Fatimid Caliphate, the Qarmatians broke away from the pro-Fatimid branch in 899 over doctrinal innovations introduced by the eventual first Fatimid caliph, al-Mahdi Billah, refusing to recognize him as their imam. Contemporary Muslim sources, as well as some modern scholars, held that the Qarmatians secretly coordinated their attacks with the Fatimids, but this has been disproven. The Fatimids made several attempts to get the scattered Qarmatian communities to recognize their leadership, but although they were successful in some areas, the Qarmatians of Bahrayn persistently refused to do so.) Frequently allied with the Bedouin, the Qarmatians raided the caravans of merchants and Hajj pilgrims alike, with the Ikhshidids unable to counter their attacks. The situation was such that the overland routes from Egypt to Iraq were practically cut. Modern scholars have suspected the hand of the Fatimids behind at least some of these events: according to the French Orientalist Thierry Bianquis, the Makurian raid of 956, which pillaged the area of Aswan, was "probably supported covertly by the Fatimids", and a Fatimid collusion in the Bedouin and Qarmatian attacks in Syria has been "usually supposed", but, as the historian Michael Brett cautions, there is "no real evidence" to that effect.

The domestic situation in Egypt was worsened by a series of low Nile floods beginning in 962. In 967, the flood reached the lowest level recorded during the entire early Islamic period, followed by three years when the level of the river remained well below normal. (Note: Fifteen cubits (1 Arab cubit, subdivided into 24 fingers, equalled 46.2 centimetres (18.2 in)) was the minimum level of flood required for a full harvest in the early Middle Ages that averted famine; sixteen meant a full harvest but still some hardship; seventeen, a bumper harvest; while disastrous flooding was the consequence if the river rose above eighteen cubits. In 967, the flood reached only 12 cubits and 19 fingers.) Hot winds and locust swarms also did much to destroy crops, ushering in the worst famine in living memory, aggravated further by the outbreak of a rat-borne plague. Consequently, food prices rose rapidly: by 968, a chicken was to be had at 25 times its pre-famine price, and an egg at fifty times. The capital, Fustat, suffered most heavily. The most populous city in the Islamic world after Baghdad, it was ravaged by famine and outbreaks of epidemics (which continued into the early years of Fatimid rule). The poor harvests also reduced the revenue flowing into the treasury, leading to cuts in spending. This directly affected the influential religious circles; not only were their salaries left unpaid, but the money for the upkeep of the mosques vanished, and the inability to provide the men and money necessary to guarantee their security meant that after 965, the Hajj caravans ceased altogether.

Furthermore, the 960s saw the Byzantine Empire under Nikephoros II Phokas (r. 963–969) expand at the expense of the Islamic world, capturing Crete, Cyprus, and Cilicia, and advancing into northern Syria. The Ikhshidid regime's response to this advance was hesitant and ineffective: after doing nothing to help Crete, the fleet sent in response to the fall of Cyprus was destroyed by the Byzantine navy, leaving the coasts of Egypt and Syria defenceless. The Egyptian Muslims clamoured for jihād and launched anti-Christian pogroms that were suppressed with difficulty. Fatimid propaganda was quick to exploit the Byzantine offensive, contrasting the ineffectiveness of the Ikhshidids and their Abbasid suzerains with the Fatimids, who at the time were successfully fighting with the Byzantines in southern Italy, as vigorous champions of Islam. The Byzantine advance, coupled with the contemporaneous depredations of the Bedouin and Qarmatians in central Syria, also served to deprive Egypt of Syrian wheat, its usual resort during famines.

Against this backdrop of internal problems and external threats, and following the permanent decline of their former imperial overlords, the possibility of a Fatimid takeover became an increasingly more attractive prospect to the Egyptians.

== Collapse of the Ikhshidid regime ==
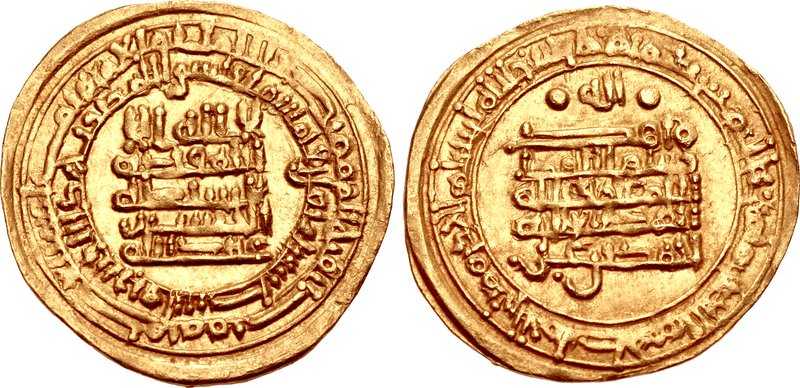
Gold dinar in the name of the last Ikhshidid ruler, Abu'l-Fawaris Ahmad, minted in 968/9 in Ramla, Palestine

The death of Abu al-Misk Kafur in April 968, without leaving an heir, paralyzed the Ikhshidid regime. Kafur's vizier, Ja'far ibn al-Furat, who was married to an Ikhshidid princess and may have entertained hopes for their son to sit on the throne, tried to control the government, but lacked a power-base outside the bureaucracy; while the army was divided into mutually antagonistic factions (chiefly the Ikhshidiyya, recruited by al-Ikhshid, and the Kafuriyya, recruited by Kafur). The military leaders would have preferred that one of their own succeed Kafur, but were forced to back down in the face of the Ikhshidid family and the opposition of the civilian and religious establishments.

The various factions initially agreed on a pact to share power under the nominal rule of al-Ikhshid's 11-year-old grandson, Abu'l-Fawaris Ahmad ibn Ali, with his uncle al-Hasan ibn Ubayd Allah, the governor of Palestine, as regent, Ibn al-Furat as vizier, and the slave-soldier (ghulām) Shamul al-Ikhshidi as commander-in-chief. The pact quickly unravelled, as the personal and factional rivalries of the Ikhshidid elites came to the fore. Shamul lacked any real authority over the army, so that the Ikhshidiyya clashed with and expelled the Kafuriyya from Egypt. At the same time, Ibn al-Furat began arresting his rivals in the administration, thereby effectively bringing government and, crucially, the flow of tax revenue, to a halt. The regent al-Hasan ibn Ubayd Allah arrived from Palestine in November and occupied Fustat, imprisoning Ibn al-Furat; but his efforts to establish his authority failed, and in early 969 he abandoned the capital and returned to Palestine, leaving Egypt effectively without government.

The historian Yaacov Lev writes that faced with this impasse, the Egyptian elites were left only "with the choice of seeking outside intervention". Given the international situation at the time, this could only mean the Fatimids. The medieval sources report that letters from civilian and military leaders alike were sent to the Fatimid caliph al-Mu'izz li-Din Allah (r. 953–975) in Ifriqiya, where preparations for a new invasion of Egypt were already in full swing.

== Fatimid preparations ==
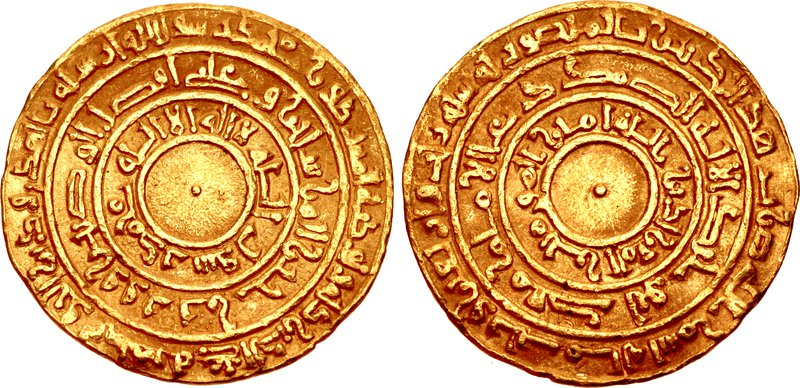
Fatimid dinar of al-Mu'izz, minted in al-Mansuriya in 954/5

The first years of the reign of al-Mu'izz were dedicated to expanding his rule over the western Maghreb and in the conflict with the Byzantines in Sicily and southern Italy, but it is clear, according to historian Paul E. Walker, that al-Mu'izz "intended the conquest of Egypt from early in his reign". Already in 965/6, al-Mu'izz began storing provisions and making preparations for a new invasion of Egypt. By that time, his armies under Jawhar had triumphed over the Umayyads of the Caliphate of Córdoba, reversing their gains and restoring Fatimid authority over what is now western Algeria and Morocco, territories that had been originally conquered by Fatimid generals in the 910s and 920s. In Sicily, the Fatimid governors captured the last Byzantine strongholds, thereby completing the Muslim conquest of the island, and defeated a Byzantine expedition sent in response. Following these successes, a truce was concluded with Constantinople in 967, leaving both powers free to pursue their designs in the East: the Byzantines against the Hamdanid Emirate of Aleppo, and the Fatimids against Egypt. The Fatimid caliph made no secret of his ambition, even boasting to the Byzantine ambassador during the negotiations that the next time they met would be in Egypt.

=== Military preparations ===
Unlike the rashly undertaken expeditions of his predecessors, al-Mu'izz carefully prepared for his Egyptian venture, investing time and enormous resources. According to the 15th-century Egyptian historian al-Maqrizi, the Caliph spent 24 million gold dinars for the purpose. Lev points out that the figure "should perhaps not be taken literally", but nevertheless "gives an idea of the resources available to the Fatimids" for the enterprise. The fact that al-Mu'izz was able to amass such enormous sums is an indicator of the Fatimid state's flourishing finances during this period, boosted by taxes levied on the trans-Saharan trade—some 400,000 dinars, half the Fatimids' annual revenue, derived from the Sijilmasa trade terminus in 951/2 alone—and the massive importation of high-quality gold from sub-Saharan Africa. (Note: For a discussion on the impact of trans-Saharan trade, the import of unminted gold, and Fatimid fiscal practices, cf. Brett 2001, pp. 247–266) These funds were augmented in 968 by special taxes levied for the imminent expedition.

In 966 Jawhar, fresh from his triumph in the Maghreb, was sent to the Kutama homeland in Lesser Kabylia to recruit men and raise funds: he returned to the Fatimid capital in December 968 with fresh Berber troops and half a million dinars. The governor of Barqa was ordered to prepare the route to Egypt, with new wells being dug along it at regular intervals. This meticulous preparation also reflects the increased strength and stability of the Fatimid regime. As Lev points out, "their first armies dispatched against Egypt lacked discipline and terrorized the population", while the army assembled by al-Mu'izz was "very large, well paid and disciplined". The venture was entrusted to Jawhar, who was given supreme authority for the expedition: the Caliph decreed that the governors of the towns along his route had to dismount in his presence and kiss his hand.

=== Fatimid propaganda in Egypt ===
Anti-Abbasid and pro-Fatimid Isma'ili propaganda was widespread in the Islamic world during the early 10th century, with Isma'ili sympathizers even in the Abbasid court. In 904, the eventual first Fatimid caliph had sought refuge in Egypt, then ruled by the autonomous Tulunid dynasty, and had remained in hiding with sympathizers in Fustat for about a year, until the Abbasids recovered control of the province in early 905. While the Fatimid leader fled west to Sijilmasa, the brother of Abu Abdallah al-Shi'i was left behind to maintain contact with other parts of the Fatimid missionary propaganda network (the daʿwa).

The activity of Fatimid agents-provocateurs and sympathizers in Egypt is attested in the sources in 917/8, in the lead-up to the second invasion. In 919, the local governor arrested several people who were in correspondence with the invading Fatimid army. Following the failure of the initial invasion attempts, the Fatimids turned even more to propaganda and subversion. As a major commercial centre with an ethnically and confessionally diverse population, Fustat was easily infiltrated by agents of the Fatimid daʿwa. The activity of the daʿwa is shown in a marked rise in pro-Shi'a, or specifically Isma'ili, inscriptions among Egyptian tombstones in the decades after c. 912. Even Fatimid dinars, known for their high quality, appear to have circulated bearing the mint-mark Miṣr ('Egypt') a decade before the actual conquest. Their presence has puzzled modern historians: some see them as an error, or an anticipation of the eventual conquest, but others consider them a deliberate provocation and part of the psychological warfare the Fatimids engaged in against the Ikhshidid regime.

Remarkably, a delegation of Fatimid missionaries was publicly received by Kafur, and the daʿwa was allowed to establish itself and operate openly at Fustat, its agents stressing that "the Fatimid rule would commence only upon Kafur's death". The leader of the daʿwa, the wealthy merchant Abu Ja'far Ahmad ibn Nasr, maintained friendly relations with the local elites, including the vizier Ibn al-Furat, and had possibly bribed several of them. The city's merchants, who had a special interest in having stability, and thus normal trade, restored, were particularly susceptible to Ibn Nasr's arguments. In addition, some sources claim that the regent al-Hasan ibn Ubayd Allah was under Ibn Nasr's influence; when the troops rioted in Fustat, Ibn Nasr counselled al-Hasan to appeal to al-Mu'izz, and personally delivered a letter to that effect to the Caliph. Meanwhile, his lieutenant Jabir ibn Muhammad organized the daʿwa in the residential quarters of the city, distributing Fatimid banners to display upon the expected arrival of the Fatimid army. The Fatimids also received the aid of the Jewish convert Ya'qub ibn Killis, who had harboured ambitions to become vizier himself before being persecuted by his rival Ibn al-Furat. Ibn Killis fled to Ifriqiya in September 968, where he converted to Isma'ilism and assisted the Fatimids with his knowledge of Egyptian affairs. The Ikhshidid establishment was thoroughly penetrated; some Turkish commanders are reported to have written to al-Mu'izz inviting him to conquer Egypt, while even Ibn al-Furat is suspected by some modern historians to have joined the pro-Fatimid party.

Modern accounts of the events stress the importance of the Fatimids' "skilful political propaganda" (Marius Canard) that preceded the actual invasion. Coupled with the famine affecting Egypt and the political crisis of the Ikhshidid regime, this "intensive period of psychological and political preparation" (Thierry Bianquis) proved more decisive than military strength, and allowed the conquest to be carried out quickly and without much difficulty. The Fatimid cause was further helped by the terror inspired by news of the continuation of the Byzantine advance into northern Syria in 968: the Byzantines raided the area at will, and captured large numbers of Muslim prisoners, without facing serious opposition by the Abbasid-aligned Muslim rulers of the region.

== Invasion and conquest of Egypt ==
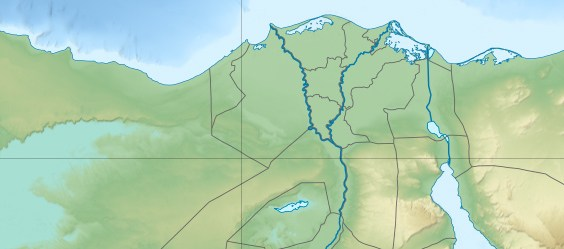
Sites of the campaign in Lower Egypt

Jawhar set up his tent at Raqqada on 26 December 968, and the expedition began to assemble under his supervision. Caliph al-Mu'izz came almost daily to the growing camp from the nearby palace city of Mansuriya. The army assembled was reported by Arab sources to have numbered over a hundred thousand men, and was to be accompanied by a strong naval squadron, (Note: In 968, the Fatimid governor of Sicily, Ahmad al-Kalbi, was recalled, with his family and property, in order to lead the naval component of the Egyptian expedition. Ahmad arrived with 30 ships at Tripoli, but soon fell ill and died. However, the sources make no mention of the navy's activity during the actual conquest, and it is not until June/July 972 that a Fatimid fleet is mentioned in Egypt, recently arrived from Ifriqiya.) and a war treasury of over 1,000 chests filled with gold. On 6 February 969, the army set out, following a formal ceremony presided over by the Caliph in person, during which he bestowed full plenipotentiary powers on Jawhar. As a sign of this, only he and Jawhar were allowed to remain on their horses during the ceremony; all other dignitaries, including the Caliph's sons and brothers, were ordered to dismount and do Jawhar homage. To further underscore the authority bestowed on his new viceroy, al-Mu'izz accompanied the army on horseback for a while, and then sent the luxurious clothing he wore on that day to Jawhar. The army marched to Barqa, where Ibn Killis joined the army.

In May 969, the Fatimid army entered the Nile Delta. Jawhar occupied Alexandria without resistance and erected a fortified camp at Tarruja, on the western edge of the Delta, close to Alexandria, while his vanguard advanced towards the Fayyum oasis. Jawhar's troops did not meet any resistance as they entered the country, and the Fatimid general quickly became master of the west bank of the Nile, from the sea to the Fayyum. Then he stopped, awaiting the reaction of Fustat.

=== Jawhar's amān ===
As the administrative centre and largest city of the country, Fustat was the key to controlling Egypt. The Fatimids' own experience made them well aware of this. In their previous invasions, although they had managed to occupy much of the country, their failure to capture Fustat determined the outcome of the campaign. Conversely, Lev points to the career of Muhammad ibn Tughj al-Ikhshid, and Jawhar's own success in 969, as evidence that "the conquest of the centre determined the fate of the country, although the provinces were not totally subjugated".

In early June, the ruling circles of Fustat sent a delegation to Jawhar with a list of demands, notably assurances for their personal safety and a guarantee of their properties and positions. The leader of the Ikhshidiyya, Nihrir al-Shuwayzan, being in command of the only sizeable military body, requested in addition that he be nominated as governor of the holy cities of Mecca and Medina, a demand that Lev dismisses as "unrealistic" and revealing a "complete lack of understanding for the Fatimid particular religious sensitivities." The delegation comprised the leaders of the ashrāf (Note: Even though the local Muslims were overwhelmingly Sunni, the ashrāf (those claiming descent from the family of Muhammad) enjoyed an exceptionally high status in Egypt, and prominent members of the ashrāf were often used as mediators in political disputes. The Fatimids were careful to court them, not only for their influence with the local population, but also because the recognition of Fatimid overlordship by their close relatives, the ashrāf of Mecca and Medina, was a major, and assiduously sought, boost to Fatimid claims of legitimacy of leadership of the Islamic world.) families—the Husaynid Abu Ja'far Muslim, the Hasanid Abu Isma'il al-Rassi, and the Abbasid Abu'l-Tayyib—the chief qāḍī of Fustat, Abu Tahir al-Dhuhli, and the chief Fatimid agent, Ibn Nasr.

In exchange for the peaceful submission of the country, Jawhar, as the representative of al-Mu'izz, issued a writ of safe-conduct (amān) and a list of promises to the Egyptian population. (Note: The text of the amān was preserved by the contemporary Egyptian historian Ibn Zulaq (died 997). Most of his actual work is lost, but his detailed, and largely eyewitness, account of the conquest and the first years of Fatimid rule, forms the basis for almost all later historians, such as those of Ibn Sa'id, al-Maqrizi, and Idris Imad al-Din. For the text of the amān as relayed by al-Maqrizi, cf. Jiwa 2009, pp. 68–72) As Lev points out, the amān was "a manifesto setting forth the political programme of the new regime and a piece of propaganda". Thus the amān opened by trying to justify the invasion by the need to protect the Muslims in the eastern parts of the Islamic world from their enemies—implying, but not explicitly naming, the Byzantines. The letter proposed a number of concrete improvements to be undertaken by the new regime, which revealed the detailed knowledge of Egyptian affairs provided to the Fatimids by their agents in the country, such as restoring order and securing the pilgrimage routes, or ending illegal taxes and improving the coinage. The pledge to defend the pilgrims was, in the words of the Orientalist Wilferd Madelung, "an open declaration of war" on the Qarmatians, whom Jawhar explicitly named and cursed in his letter. The Islamic religious classes (preachers, jurists, etc.) were placated by promises to pay them salaries, restore existing mosques and build new ones.

Most importantly, the letter ended by emphasizing the unity of Islam and the return to the "true sunna" of the Prophet and the early generations of Islam, thereby claiming a common ground espoused by the Sunni and Shi'a alike. Its phrasing concealed the Fatimids' true intentions, since according to Isma'ili doctrine, it was the Fatimid imam–caliph who was the true heir and interpreter of the "true sunna". It would quickly become apparent that, in the all-important topic of public rites and jurisprudence (fiqh), the Fatimids were intent on granting precedence to Ismai'ili doctrine. For the time being, the letter achieved its purpose: "on the whole", writes Lev, "it was a persuasive document appealing to wide sections of the Egyptian society".

=== Occupation of Fustat ===
The delegation returned to Fustat on 26 June, bearing Jawhar's letter. Even before the envoys arrived, rumours spread that the military refused to accept it, and had resolved to fight and bar passage over the Nile. When the letter was publicly read, the officers in particular vociferously opposed it, and not even the intervention of the vizier Ibn al-Furat could persuade them to submit. Jawhar then declared his expedition a jihād against the Byzantines, and had the chief qāḍī confirm that anyone who barred his way was an enemy of the faith and could be killed. On the Egyptian side, Nihrir was chosen as common commander of the Ikhshidiyya and the Kafuriyya, who on 28 June occupied Rawda Island, which controlled passage over the pontoon bridge that connected Fustat with Giza on the western shore of the Nile, where Jawhar had set up camp.

The course of the subsequent conflict is unclear, as the sources report different details. The first engagement came on the 29th, but Jawhar was forced to withdraw. After that, Jawhar decided to cross the river elsewhere. Depending on the source, this was done with boats either provided by a group of defecting Ikhshidid ghilmān, or captured by Ja'far ibn Fallah from an Ikhshidid fleet sent from Lower Egypt to assist the garrison of Fustat. Using these boats, Ibn Fallah led a part of the Fatimid army across, although the exact site is unknown. According to al-Maqrizi, four Ikhshidid commanders had been sent with their troops to reinforce the possible landing points, but the Fatimid troops managed to cross the river. On 3 July, the two armies clashed, and the Fatimids prevailed. No details are known, but the entire Ikhshidid force sent from Giza to oppose the Fatimids was destroyed. The rest of the Ikhshidid troops then abandoned Rawda and dispersed, leaving Fustat and fleeing as far as Syria to seek safety.

Fustat was left in chaos by these events, but at that moment the Fatimid daʿwa came forth, made contact with the chief of police, and hung white Fatimid banners (Note: The Fatimid dynastic colour was white, in opposition to Abbasid black, while red and yellow banners were associated with the Fatimid caliph's person.) over the city in token of submission, while the police chief marched through the streets ringing a bell and carrying a banner proclaiming al-Mu'izz as caliph. The resistance of the troops had broken Jawhar's amān and made the city licit for plunder according to custom. Jawhar consented to renew the amān, charging Abu Ja'far Muslim with its upkeep, while Ibn al-Furat was tasked with confiscating the houses of the officers who had fled.

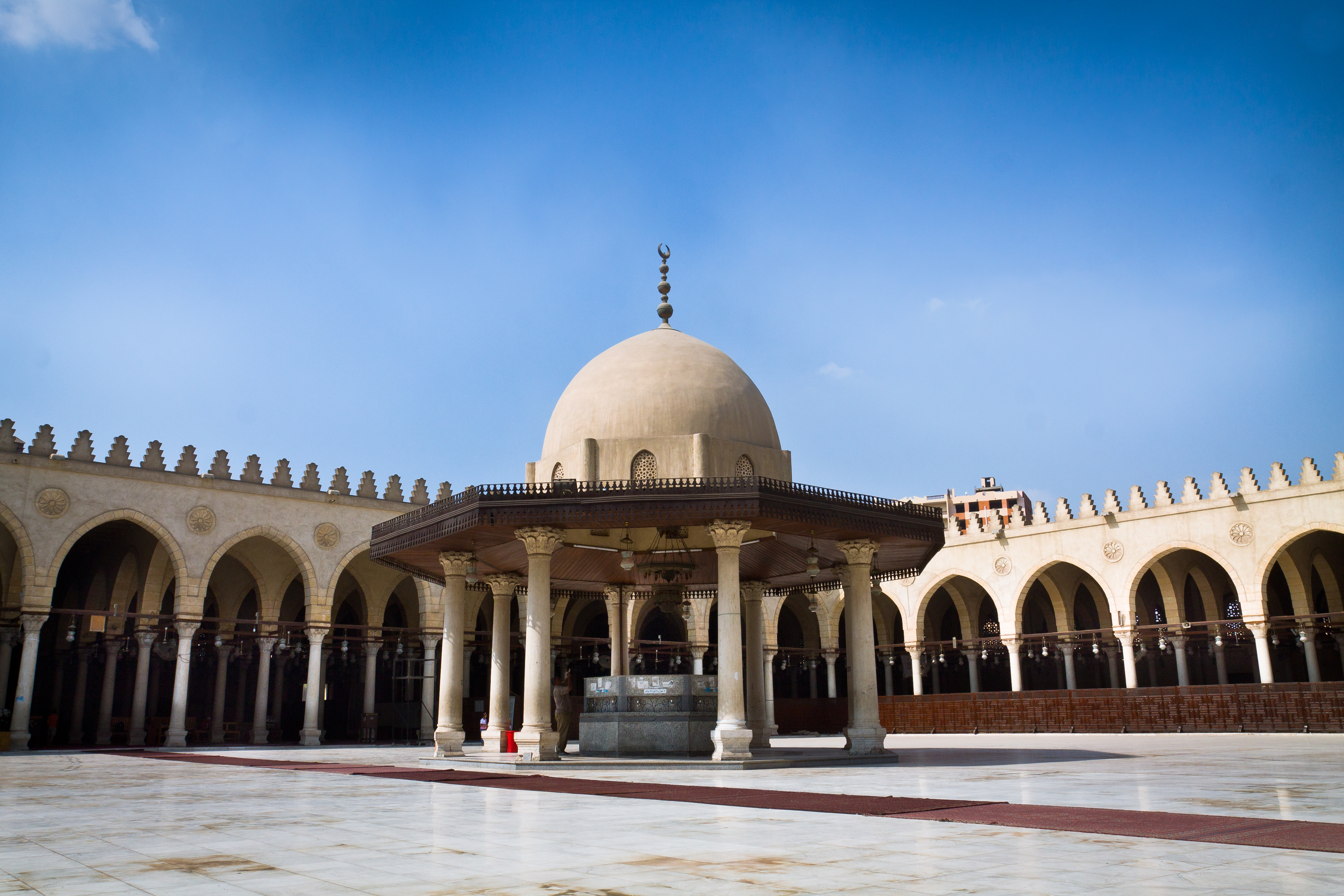
The interior courtyard of the Mosque of Amr ibn al-As, where the conqueror of Egypt, Jawhar, led the Friday prayer after entering Fustat.

On 6 July, Ibn al-Furat and Abu Ja'far Muslim, accompanied by the leading merchants, led a crowd over the pontoon bridge to pay homage to Jawhar at Giza. On the same evening, the Fatimid army began crossing the bridge, and set up camp some 5 kilometres (3 mi) north of the city. On the next day, the distribution of alms was announced, financed by the treasure that Jawhar had borne with him: money was distributed to the poor by the army's qāḍī, Ali ibn al-Walid al-Ishbili. On 9 July, Jawhar led the Friday prayer in the Mosque of Amr in Fustat, where the Sunni preacher, dressed in Alid white and reading the unfamiliar phrases from a note, recited the khuṭba in the name of al-Mu'izz.

== Consolidation of Fatimid rule ==
=== Pursuit of the Ikhshidid remnants and attempted expansion into Syria ===
The Ikhshidid remnants gathered in Palestine under al-Hasan ibn Ubayd Allah, while further north, the Byzantines captured Antioch after a long siege and forced the Hamdanids of Aleppo into vassalage. Jawhar therefore sent an army under Ja'far ibn Fallah to subdue the last Ikhshidid forces and, in the spirit of the promises to recommence the jihād, confront the Byzantines.

The Fatimid troops defeated and captured al-Hasan ibn Ubayd Allah in May 970, but the inhabitants of Damascus were enraged by the unruliness of the Kutama soldiers and resisted until November 970, when the city capitulated and was pillaged. From Damascus a Fatimid army moved north to besiege Antioch, only to be defeated by the Byzantines. At the same time, Ibn Fallah faced the attack of the Qarmatians, who allied themselves with the Arab Bedouin tribes of the region. Ibn Fallah was defeated and killed in battle in August 971, and Fatimid rule in Syria and Palestine collapsed, leaving the road to Egypt open.

The Fatimids were more successful in the Hejaz and the two Muslim holy cities of Mecca and Medina, thanks in large part to liberal gifts of gold sent by al-Mu'izz. In Medina, where the Husaynids were ascendant, Abu Ja'far Muslim held great influence, and the khuṭba was proclaimed for the first time in the Fatimid Caliph's name in 969, or according to Ibn al-Jawzi and Ibn al-Athir, 970. The Hasanid Ja'far ibn Muhammad al-Hasani, who had just established himself as ruler of Mecca in c. 968, is said to have proclaimed the khuṭba in al-Mu'izz's name as soon as news of the conquest of Egypt reached him, but Najm al-Din Umar reports of the dispatch of a joint Fatimid–Medinan expedition in 972 to force Ja'far to pronounce the khuṭba on behalf of the Fatimid Caliph; Ibn al-Jawzi and Ibn al-Athir put the recitation of the Friday prayer as late as 974, while al-Maqrizi, relying on lost Fatimid documents, in 975. Recognition of Fatimid overlordship by the Hejazi ashrāf, expressed through the naming of the Fatimid caliph in the khuṭba, and the resumption of the Hajj caravans from 974/5 on, were major boosts to the Fatimid dynasty's claims to legitimacy.

=== Jawhar as viceroy of Egypt ===
While the capture of Fustat, the most important settlement and the seat of the administration, was of critical importance, Egypt was not yet wholly under Fatimid control. While Ja'far ibn Fallah moved into Syria, Jawhar remained in Egypt to consolidate Fatimid authority as viceroy or proconsul. His tasks were to restore an orderly government, stabilize the new regime, confront the remnants of the defeated Ikhshidid troops, and extend Fatimid rule to the north (the Nile Delta area) and south (Upper Egypt).

==== Treatment of the Ikhshidid troops ====
Already in 969, Jawhar accepted the submission of fourteen leaders of the Ikhshidiyya and the Kafuriyya, with some 5,000–6,000 of their men; the commanders were arrested and the troops disarmed. The properties of the Ikhshidid troops, commanders and rank-and-file alike, were also systematically confiscated by the new regime.

The Fatimids distrusted the loyalty of the former Ikhshidid troops and refused to incorporate them as regulars into their army. Exceptionally, some former Ikhshidid commanders were employed in the early years of the new regime to suppress revolts in Egypt due to their superior local knowledge. The disbanded rank-and-file soldiers on the other hand were exploited as a manpower reserve for emergencies, especially since they were deprived of any other means of livelihood. Many were recruited to confront the Qarmatian invasion in 971, but after it was repulsed, Jawhar arrested 900 of them, who were not released until they were recruited against a second Qarmatian invasion in 974. Former Ikhshidid troops were recruited to shore up the Fatimid military following heavy defeats as late as 981. Many more Ikhshidid troops, who had fled Egypt, joined the Qarmatians instead.

==== Domestic administration and reforms ====
In his domestic policies, Jawhar had to be careful to avoid creating resentment among the local elites, and to ensure the continuation of an orderly administration. As a result, he largely left the experienced personnel from the previous regime in place: Ibn al-Furat remained in office as vizier, as did the chief qāḍī and the chief preacher, as well as the heads of the administrative bureaux; Jawhar merely appointed a Kutama supervisor to keep them in line. Jawhar also set up weekly sessions to hear grievances (maẓālim), certain taxes were abolished, and properties illegally confiscated by the treasury were returned to their owners. Pursuant to the promises in his amān, Jawhar also established a new mint in Fustat, which minted gold dinars of high quality; so high, in fact, that the Egyptians preferred to hoard rather than use them. Jawhar tried to regulate the conversion rate between the new Fatimid dinars and the old, debased, Abbasid coinage, but largely failed to do so, and caused widespread resentment when he set the Abbasid dinar at an artificially low conversion rate to drive it out of circulation. The issue remained unresolved until al-Mu'izz arrived in Egypt with large quantities of gold bullion; only then did the Fatimid dinars prevail in the Egyptian market.

In religious matters, Jawhar trod carefully, and Isma'ili rites were only gradually introduced. At the Mosque of Amr, the Sunni rites were retained for the moment, and only at the Mosque of Ibn Tulun, which served as a congregational mosque for the Fatimid army's encampment, was the Fatimid call to prayer (the adhān) introduced in March 970. Nevertheless, tensions erupted in October 969, when the Fatimid army's qāḍī ended the Ramadan fast a day earlier than the Sunni chief qāḍī. The Fatimid regime also imposed a stricter moral code, reflecting both the Fatimids' own puritanism and a deliberate attempt to reverse the supposed libertinism of the Ikhshidids. These measures contributed to the regime's popularity among the Sunni religious classes, but also provoked some resistance.

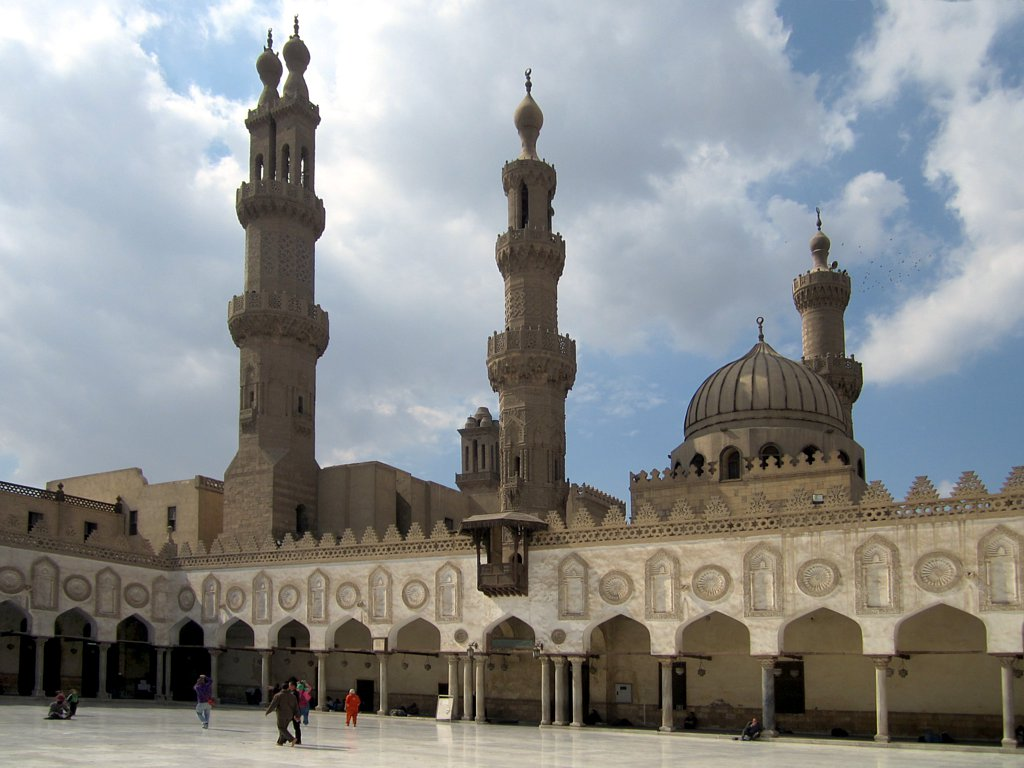
View of the al-Azhar Mosque, begun by Jawhar in 970, from the interior courtyard (2013)

The Fatimid soldiery also caused problems with the native population: stemming from the margins of the Islamic world, the Kutama with their rustic manners and lack of Arabic, nevertheless treated Egypt as a conquered land and the natives with contempt, resulting in frequent clashes, as the Berbers often seized whatever caught their fancy. After several such incidents, Jawhar had to formally prohibit the Kutama to even enter Fustat during the night. This led to the consolidation of the separation of the Isma'ili Kutama and the Fatimid apparatus from the Sunni populace of Fustat with the erection of a new palace city (that would become Cairo) at the site of Jawhar's army encampment. Like its Ifriqiyan counterpart, it was originally named al-Mansuriya; even the names of certain gates and city quarters were copied. Its centrepiece, the al-Azhar Mosque, was begun by Jawhar on 4 April 970, and completed in the summer of 972.

==== Pacification of the provinces and the Qarmatian invasion ====
As early as November/December 969, Jawhar sent troops under a former Ikhshidid commander, Ali ibn Muhammad al-Khazin, to combat brigandage in Upper Egypt. At some point thereafter, Jawhar also sent the da'i Ibn Salim al-Aswani as an envoy to the Christian kingdoms of Nubia, to renew the treaty regulating trade and tribute (baqt) and to demand—without success—the conversion of the Nubian kings to Islam. Al-Aswani's mission is mostly notable for his description of Nubia, and of the sources of the Nile, being the first Arab traveller to reach that far south. In the Delta, the situation was more volatile. The marshy terrain and the complex social and religious divisions in the local population were unfamiliar to his Kutama, so that Jawhar initially entrusted former Ikhshidid officers with operations as well. Muzahim ibn Ra'iq, who with his men had submitted to the Fatimids, was appointed governor of Farama, and the former Ikhshidid commander Tibr was sent against Tinnis, where a revolt against heavy taxation had broken out. Soon, however, Tibr joined the rebels and became their leader, encouraging the locals to refuse payment of their taxes. After generous blandishments failed to make him return to the fold, Jawhar sent another army against Tinnis. Tibr fled to Syria, but was captured and executed by the Fatimids.

In September 971, Jawhar had to confront the Qarmatians, who, after their victory over Ibn Fallah, invaded Egypt. Instead of advancing directly on Fustat, however, the Qarmatians turned to the eastern Delta. Their approach rekindled the rebellion in Tinnis, and the entire region rose in revolt. A Fatimid army briefly retook Farama, but in the face of the uprising it had to withdraw to Fustat, with the Qarmatians in pursuit. Nevertheless, this delayed the Qarmatian attack on Fustat for two months, and gave Jawhar time to prepare a line of fortifications and a trench at Ayn Shams, north of the capital, stretching for 10 kilometres (6 mi) from the Nile to the Muqattam hills. The Fatimid general called almost the entire male population of Fustat to arms, and in two fierce battles on 22 and 24 December 971, despite heavy losses, managed to defeat his opponents. The Qarmatians broke and retreated back into Palestine, many being killed during their retreat for the bounty set on them by Jawhar. Two days after the battle, reinforcements arrived from Ifriqiya under al-Hasan ibn Ammar, securing the Fatimids' grip over the country.

The Qarmatian invasion not only breathed new life into the revolt at Tinnis and the Delta, but led to a general surge in anti-Fatimid activity. In Upper Egypt, the Kilabi leader Abd al-Aziz ibn Ibrahim, formerly an ally, now rose in revolt in the name of the Abbasid caliph. An expedition under the Nubian commander Bishara was sent against him, and he was captured and brought to Cairo in a cage in early 973. The revolt in the Delta persisted for a few years, especially as Jawhar could not spare the necessary resources to confront it. It was only in the summer of 972 that troops under Ibn Ammar began a brutal suppression campaign. The Qarmatians sent a fleet to assist Tinnis, but in September/October 972 seven Qarmatian ships and 500 crew were captured by the Fatimid forces. Al-Maqrizi puts this a year later, in June/July 973, so there may have been two Qarmatian naval expeditions against Tinnis, which accords with Ibn Zulaq's claim that al-Mu'izz scored two naval victories against them. Tinnis eventually submitted, paying a million silver dirhams as a ransom to avoid reprisals.

==== Assessment ====
Jawhar's rule was more or less successful in securing control of Egypt, and made important headway in having the new regime accepted by the local population, chiefly by the prudence and restraint shown in imposing Isma'ili doctrine (an area in which Jawhar's practice contrasted sharply with that followed by al-Mu'izz, once the caliph arrived in Egypt). However, the disastrous campaign into Syria, the repulse of the Qarmatian invasion, the continued process of pacifying Egypt, and the construction of a new capital, entailed an enormous expenditure of manpower and financial resources. The tumults of these years also disrupted the ongoing recovery of Egyptian agriculture, and the administration's ability to tax it. As a result, in the words of Michael Brett, "three years after the triumphal entry of Jawhar into Fustat, the expectation, or hope, of a conquest spreading as far as Baghdad had been dashed".

Apart from Ramla, which was briefly reoccupied in May 972, the bulk of Syria remained outside Fatimid control. Indeed, the Fatimids had to confront a second Qarmatian invasion of Egypt in 974. Once again the Delta was captured by the Qarmatians, while a second force, led by none other than Abu Ja'far Muslim's brother Akhu Muslim, bypassed Cairo and encamped between Asyut and Akhmim. Many scions of the most prominent ashrāf families flocked to join him. Once more the populace of the capital was called to arms, and the Qarmatians fought off in a battle just north of Ayn Shams. Only under al-Mu'izz's successor, al-Aziz Billah (r. 975–996), did the Fatimids manage to capture Damascus and extend their control to most of Syria.

=== Transfer of the Fatimid court to Egypt ===
Following the repulsion of the Qarmatian attack, and despite the continuing local unrest, Jawhar judged Egypt to be sufficiently pacified to invite his master, al-Mu'izz, to come to Egypt. The Fatimid caliph began preparations to move with his entire court, treasure, and even the coffins of his ancestors from Ifriqiya to Egypt. After long preparations, the Fatimid ruler and his entourage left Ifriqiyan al-Mansuriya on 5 August 972 for Sardaniya near Aïn Djeloula, where, for the next four months, those Fatimid followers who wanted to follow their leader came to join him. There, on 2 October, al-Mu'izz appointed Buluggin ibn Ziri as his viceroy in Ifriqiya. (Note: In the event, the shift of the Fatimid court to Egypt very quickly resulted in the de facto loss of its authority over Ifriqiya and Sicily, where over the following decades the Zirid and Kalbid dynasties became effectively independent, and even turned hostile to the Fatimids.) On 14 November, the huge column of men and animals set off for Egypt, arriving at Alexandria on 30 May 973, and Giza on 7 June. On the way, he was met by a delegation of notables headed by Abu Ja'far Muslim, who accompanied him on the final stage of his journey. On 10 June, al-Mu'izz crossed the Nile. Ignoring Fustat and the festive reception organized for him there, he went straight for his new capital, which he renamed as al-Qāhira al-Muʿizzīya ("the Victorious City of al-Mu'izz"), a name which in English was corrupted to Cairo.

The arrival of the Fatimid caliph and his court was a major turning point in Egyptian history. Already during the preceding Tulunid and Ikhshidid regimes, the country had become, for the first time since the Ptolemies, the seat of an independent polity, and had emerged as an autonomous regional power. Nevertheless, the ambitions of these regimes were regional and tied to the personalities of their rulers, who remained in the orbit of the Abbasid court; whereas the Fatimid regime represented a power at once imperial and revolutionary, with a religious mandate that gave them ecumenical pretensions in direct opposition to the Abbasids. This event also had repercussions for the development of Twelver Shi'ism and Sunnism alike in the eastern Islamic lands: with the Fatimids emerging as a serious claimant to the leadership of the Islamic world, the other Shi'a sects—most notably the Twelvers—were compelled to differentiate themselves from the Isma'ili Fatimids, thus accelerating the ongoing process of their separation into a distinct community, marked by its own doctrine, ritual and festivals. In turn, this led to a similar process among the Sunnis (the so-called "Sunni Revival"), culminating in the codification of Sunni doctrine and the anti-Shi'ite manifestos of the Abbasid caliph al-Qadir (r. 991–1031). The result was a hardening of the Shi'a–Sunni divide into mutually exclusive groups. As the historian Hugh Kennedy writes, "it was no longer possible to be simply a Muslim: one was either Sunni or Shi'ite". Even though the Fatimids ultimately failed in their ambitions—their rule was ended by Saladin in 1171, who restored Sunnism and Abbasid suzerainty to Egypt—they transformed Egypt, and their capital, Cairo, founded to be the seat of a universal empire, has since then been one of the main centres of the Islamic world.

== Sources ==
- Bianquis, Thierry (1972). "La prise de pouvoir par les Fatimides en Égypte (357–363/968–974)" [The Seizure of Power by the Fatimids in Egypt (357–363/968–974)]. Annales islamologiques (in French). XI: 49–108. doi:10.3406/anisl.1972.950. ISSN 0570-1716. S2CID 259055451.
- Bianquis, Thierry (1998). "Autonomous Egypt from Ibn Ṭūlūn to Kāfūr, 868–969". In Petry, Carl F. (ed.). The Cambridge History of Egypt: Islamic Egypt, 640–1517. Vol. 1. Cambridge: Cambridge University Press. pp. 86–119. ISBN 0-521-47137-0.
- Bloom, Jonathan M. (1987). "The Mosque of Qarafa in Cairo". Muqarnas: An Annual on Islamic Art and Architecture. IV. Leiden: E.J. Brill. ISSN 0732-2992.
- Brett, Michael (2001). The Rise of the Fatimids: The World of the Mediterranean and the Middle East in the Fourth Century of the Hijra, Tenth Century CE. The Medieval Mediterranean. Vol. 30. Leiden, Boston, Köln: Brill. ISBN 90-04-11741-5.
- Brett, Michael (2010). "Egypt". In Robinson, Chase F. (ed.). The New Cambridge History of Islam, Volume 1: The Formation of the Islamic World, Sixth to Eleventh Centuries. Cambridge: Cambridge University Press. pp. 541–580. ISBN 978-0-521-83823-8.
- Canard, Marius (1942–1947). "L'impérialisme des Fatimides et leur propagande" [The Imperialism of the Fatimids and their Propaganda]. Annales de l'Institut d'études Orientales (in French). VI: 156–193.
- Canard, Marius (1965). "Fāṭimids". In Lewis, B.; Pellat, Ch. & Schacht, J. (eds.). The Encyclopaedia of Islam, Second Edition. Volume II: C–G. Leiden: E. J. Brill. pp. 850–862. OCLC 495469475.
- Dachraoui, F. (1993). "al-Muʿizz li-Dīn Allāh". In Bosworth, C. E.; van Donzel, E.; Heinrichs, W. P. & Pellat, Ch. (eds.). The Encyclopaedia of Islam, Second Edition. Volume VII: Mif–Naz. Leiden: E. J. Brill. pp. 485–489. ISBN 978-90-04-09419-2.
- Ehrenkreutz, Andrew S.; Heck, Gene W. (1986). "Additional Evidence of the Fāṭimid Use of Dīnārs for Propaganda Purposes". In Sharon, Moshe (ed.). Studies in Islamic History and Civilisation in honour of Professor David Ayalon. Jerusalem: Cana Ltd. pp. 145–152. ISBN 965-264-014-X.
- Gibb, H. A. R. (1936). "al-Muʿizz li-Dīn Allāh". In M. Th. Houtsma; A. J. Wensinck; E. Lévi-Provençal; H. A. R. Gibb; W. Heffening (eds.). The Encyclopaedia of Islām, A Dictionary of the Geography, Ethnography and Biography of the Muhammadan Peoples. Volume III: L–R. Leiden and London: E. J. Brill and Luzac & Co. pp. 706–707. OCLC 221097825.
- Halm, Heinz (1991). Das Reich des Mahdi: Der Aufstieg der Fatimiden [The Empire of the Mahdi: The Rise of the Fatimids] (in German). Munich: C. H. Beck. ISBN 978-3-406-35497-7.
- Halm, Heinz (2003). Die Kalifen von Kairo: Die Fatimiden in Ägypten, 973–1074 [The Caliphs of Cairo: The Fatimids in Egypt, 973–1074] (in German). Munich: C. H. Beck. ISBN 3-406-48654-1.
- Hathaway, Jane (2012). A Tale of Two Factions: Myth, Memory, and Identity in Ottoman Egypt and Yemen. Albany: State University of New York Press. ISBN 978-0-7914-8610-8.
- Jiwa, Shainool, ed. (2009). Towards a Shi'i Mediterranean Empire: Fatimid Egypt and the Founding of Cairo. The Reign of Imam-Caliph al-Muʿizz, from al-Maqrīzī's Ittiʿāẓ al-ḥunafāʾ. London and New York: I.B. Tauris. ISBN 978-0-8577-1742-9.
- Kennedy, Hugh (2004) [1986]. The Prophet and the Age of the Caliphates: The Islamic Near East from the 6th to the 11th Century (Second ed.). Harlow: Longman. ISBN 978-0-582-40525-7.
- Kennedy, Hugh (2010). "The Late ʿAbbasid Pattern, 945–1050". In Robinson, Chase F. (ed.). The New Cambridge History of Islam, Volume 1: The Formation of the Islamic World, Sixth to Eleventh Centuries. Cambridge: Cambridge University Press. pp. 360–393. ISBN 978-0-521-83823-8.
- Lev, Yaacov (1979). "The Fāṭimid Conquest of Egypt – Military Political and Social Aspects". Israel Oriental Studies. 9: 315–328. ISSN 0334-4401.
- Lev, Yaacov (1984). "The Fāṭimid Navy, Byzantium and the Mediterranean Sea, 909–1036 CE/297–427 AH". Byzantion: Revue internationale des études byzantines. 54 (1): 220–252. ISSN 0378-2506. JSTOR 44170866.
- Lev, Yaacov (1988). "The Fāṭimids and Egypt 301–358/914–969". Arabica. 35 (2): 186–196. doi:10.1163/157005888X00332. ISSN 0570-5398.
- Lev, Yaacov (1988b). "The Fātimid Imposition of Isma'īlism on Egypt (358–386/969–996)". Zeitschrift der Deutschen Morgenländischen Gesellschaft. 138 (2): 313–325. ISSN 0341-0137. JSTOR 43377841.
- Lev, Yaacov (1991). State and Society in Fatimid Egypt. Leiden: Brill. ISBN 90-04-09344-3.
- Madelung, Wilferd (1996). "The Fatimids and the Qarmatīs of Bahrayn". In Daftary, Farhad (ed.). Mediaeval Isma'ili History and Thought. Cambridge University Press. pp. 21–73. ISBN 978-0-521-00310-0.
- Mortel, Richard T. (1987). "Zaydi Shiism and the Hasanid Sharifs of Mecca". International Journal of Middle East Studies. 19 (4): 455–472. doi:10.1017/S0020743800056518. JSTOR 163211. S2CID 161236719.
- Mortel, Richard T. (1991). "The Origins and Early History of the Husaynid Amirate of Madīna to the End of the Ayyūbid Period". Studia Islamica. 74 (74): 63–78. doi:10.2307/1595897. JSTOR 1595897.
- Sayyid, Ayman Fuʾād (1998). La capitale de l'Égypte jusqu'à l'époque fatimide. Al-Qāhira et al-Fusṭāṭ: Essai de reconstitution topographique [The Capital of Egypt Until the Fatimid Era. Al-Qāhira and al-Fusṭāṭ: Attempt of a Topographical Reconstruction]. Beiruter Texte und Studien (in French). Stuttgart: Franz Steiner Verlag. ISBN 3-515-05716-1.
- Walker, Paul E. (1998). "The Ismāʿīlī Daʿwa and the Fāṭimid Caliphate". In Petry, Carl F. (ed.). The Cambridge History of Egypt: Islamic Egypt, 640–1517. Vol. 1. Cambridge: Cambridge University Press. pp. 120–150. ISBN 0-521-47137-0.
