= Ibn Khaqan =

Ibn Khaqan is an Arabic nasab that indicates descent from a person named "Khaqan". Most often, this indicates descent from a Turkic ruling house (khaqan is a medieval Turkic royal title):

- Ahmad ibn Muzahim ibn Khaqan, Abbasid military governor of Egypt in 868
- al-Fath ibn Khaqan (killed 861), Abbasid writer and official, friend and chief adviser of Caliph al-Mutawakkil
- Muzahim ibn Khaqan (died 868), Abbasid military commander, governor of Egypt in 867–868
- Ubayd Allah ibn Yahya ibn Khaqan (died 877), Abbasid official, vizier in 851–861 and 870–877
- al-Fath ibn Khaqan (al-Andalus) (died 1134), Andalusi writer

== See also ==
- Khaqani (disambiguation)
