= Al-Dani =

Abū ʿAmr al-Dānī (981–1053), called Ibn al-Ṣayrafī, was a Mālikī lawyer, muḥaddith (traditionist) and Qurʾānic muqriʾ (reciter) from al-Andalus. He founded his own school of Qurʾān recitation.

== Life ==
Al-Dānī was born in 981 in the village of Qūta Rāsha, a suburb of Córdoba. His family was related to the reigning Umayyad dynasty. The main source for al-Dānī's life is a short autobiography incorporated into the biographical dictionary of Yāqūt. According to his own account, he began his formal education in the seminaries of Córdoba at the age of fourteen. On 29 September 1006, he set out for Kairouan, where he studied ḥadīth (traditions). After four months, he moved to Cairo. The following year, he undertook the Ḥajj to Mecca and also stayed in Medina. In Mecca, he studied ḥadīth, fiqh (jurisprudence) and adab (etiquette). It was there that Abū Muslim Muḥammad ibn Aḥmad al-Kātib introduced him to the seven canonical qiraʾāt (Qurʾānic readings) of Abū Bakr Ibn Mujāhid's Kitāb al-sabʿa.

From Mecca, al-Dānī returned to Córdoba, stopping in Egypt and Kairouan on the way. He arrived back home in August 1009. His return coincided with the start of the Berber uprising and fitna (civil war) that would culminate in the collapse of the Umayyad dynasty. After four years of turmoil, he fled to Zaragoza. He remained there for seven years before moving to an unidentified place called al-Wuṭṭa. In 1018, he moved to the taifa of Dénia and earned the patronage of Sultan Mujāhid al-ʿĀmirī. He lived first in the capital, Dénia, and then spent eight years in Mallorca. Al-Dānī—the nisba by which he is now known—means "the one from Dénia". In 1026, he returned to the capital to teach and write. There he founded a school of Qurʾān recitation which drew student from far afield.

Al-Dānī died in Dénia on 8 February 1053. He was given a splendid funeral procession, with Sultan ʿAlī ibn Mujāhid Iqbāl al-Dawla leading the cortège through the crowds. The funeral prayers were recited by ʿAbd Allāh ibn Khumays al-Anṣārī and he was buried at the Bāb Indāra. On account of his piety, al-Dānī was considered a mujāb al-daʿwa (one whose prayers are answered).

== Works ==
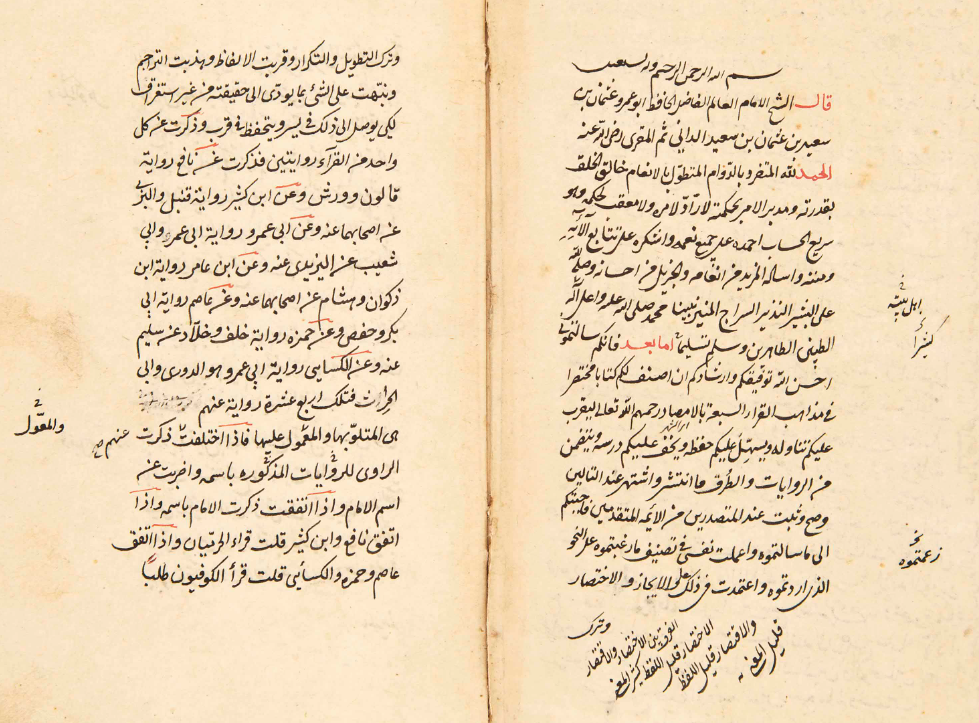
17th-century copy of al-Dani's Taysir

Al-Dānī wrote over one hundred works, of which 73 are known and about a third of that published. According to al-Dhahabī, he wrote 120 works, which he listed in an urjūza (poem). His works mainly concern the Qurʾān and the ḥadīth. He wrote on qiraʾāt (Qurʾānic readings), including non-canonical readings; tafsīr (Qurʾānic exegesis); tajwīd (Qurʾānic pronunciation); Arabic orthography; and Islamic theology.

Al-Dānī's most influential work was the Kitāb al-Taysīr fī al-qirāʾāt al-sabʿa, a manual on the seven readings of the Qurʾān. In the 12th century, al-Shāṭibī produced a versified version known as the Shāṭibiyya. Al-Shāṭibī also versified al-Dānī's Kitāb al-Muqniʿ fī maʿrifat rasm maṣāḥif al-amṣār, a treatise on Qurʾānic orthography. Al-Dānī wrote the Kitāb al-Naqṭ as an addendum to the al-Muqniʿ summarizing Arabic diacritics as used in the Qurʾān. These three works have all been published. Among al-Dānī's other works, the following have been published:

- al-Farq bayn al-ḍād wa al-ẓāʾ fī Kitāb Allāh, explaining phonetic difference between Arabic letters ḍād and ẓāʾ
- al-Muḥkam fī naqṭ al-maṣāḥif
- al-Muktafī fī al-waqf wa al-ibtidāʾ
- al-Sunan al-wārida fī al-fitan, also known as al-Fitan wa al-malāḥim
- al-Idghām al-kabīr, concerning assimilation in the readings of Abū ʿAmr al-Baṣrī
- Mūḍiḥ li-madhāhib al-qurrāʾ wa-ikhtilāfuhum fī al-fatḥ wa-al-imāla, a treatise on imāla in the seven canonical readings

Additional works found only in manuscript include:

- al-Tarjama, in which he lists his teachers and his isnād ("chain of authorities")
- Sharḥ al-Qaṣīda al-khāqāniyya, a commentary on the qaṣīda of Abū Muzaḥim Mūsā ibn ʿUbayd Allāh al-Khāqānī on the topic of tajwīd
- al-Ishāra bi laṭīf al-ʿibāra
- al-Ihtidāʾ fī al-waqf wa al-ibtidāʾ
- al-Ījāz wa al-bayān fī uṣūl qirāʾat Nāfiʿ
- al-Bayān fī ikhtilāf aʾimmat al-amṣār wa ittifāqihim fī ʿadad āyāt al-Qurʾān
- al-Taḥdīd fī al-itqān wa al-tajwīd
- Tadhkirat al-ḥāfiẓ li tarājim al-qurrāʾ al-sabʿa wa ijtimāʿihim wa ittifāqihim fī ḥurūf al-ikhtilāf
- al-Taqrīb al-nāfiʿ fī al-ṭuruq al-ʿashara li-Nāfiʿ
- Jāmiʿ al-bayān fī al-qirāʿāt al-sabʿ wa ṭuruqihā al-mashhūra wa al-gharība
- Mufradāt al-qurrāʾ al-sabʿa, a work focusing on the unique and distinctive linguistic features of the seven qirāʾats
- Naqṭ al-maṣāḥif, explaining diacritical marks used in Quranic manuscripts

== Bibliography ==
- Bencheneb, Mohamed (1913). "al-Dānī". In M. Th. Houtsma; T. W. Arnold; R. Basset (eds.). Encyclopaedia of Islam, Volume I: A–D (1st ed.). Leiden: E. J. Brill. pp. 912–913. doi:10.1163/2214-871X_ei1_SIM_1796.
- Fesharaki, Mohammad Ali Lesani (2015). "Abū ʿAmr al-Dānī". In Farhad Daftary (ed.). Encyclopaedia Islamica. Translated by Saeed Saeedpoor. Brill Online. doi:10.1163/1875-9831_isla_SIM_0042.
- Lewis, B.; Pellat, Ch. & Schacht, J., eds. (1965). "al-Dānī". The Encyclopaedia of Islam, Second Edition. Volume II: C–G. Leiden: E. J. Brill. pp. 109–110. OCLC 495469475.
- Mayor, Rafael (2018). "Abū ʿAmr al-Dānī". Diccionario biográfico español. Real Academia de la Historia.
- Penelas, Mayte (2014). "al-Dānī". In Fleet, Kate; Krämer, Gudrun; Matringe, Denis; Nawas, John; Rowson, Everett (eds.). Encyclopaedia of Islam (3rd ed.). Brill Online. ISSN 1873-9830.
- Vizcaíno, J. M.; Fakhri al-Wasif, M. (2012). "al-Dānī, Abū ʿAmr". In Jorge Lirola Delgado; José Miguel Puerta Vílchez (eds.). Biblioteca de al-Andalus. Vol. 1: De al-ʿAbbādīya a Ibn Abyaḍ. Almería: Fundación Ibn Tufayl de Estudios Árabes. pp. 308–322.
