= Dhuka al-Rumi =

Dhuka al-Rumi (Arabic: ذوكه الرومي, romanized: Dhūka al-Rūmī, lit. 'Doukas the Roman'; died 11 August 919) was a Byzantine Greek who served the Abbasid Caliphate as governor of Egypt in 915–919.

He was installed as governor of Egypt in 915 by the Abbasid commander-in-chief Mu'nis al-Muzaffar, as part of his effort to stabilize the situation in the country and expel a Fatimid invasion that had taken Alexandria. Dhuka was in Aleppo at the time, and arrived in Egypt in late August, succeeding Takin al-Khazari. The first Fatimid attempt to capture Egypt ended in failure thanks to Mu'nis' intervention, but soon the Fatimids began to make plans for a second assault, starting with the capture of Barqa after an 18-month siege in 917. The Fatimids evidently had sympathizers in Egypt, as the Egyptians since the early 9th century had come to resent rule from Baghdad; Dhuka was forced to execute several people for corresponding with the Fatimid ruler al-Mahdi Billah and his son, al-Qa'im bi-Amr Allah.

Although Dhuka had the garrison of Alexandria reinforced following the sack of Barqa, the arrival of the Fatimid expeditionary force in July 919 caught him by surprise. The city's governor, Dhuka's son Muzaffar, fled, along with his aides and many of the populace, leaving the city to be sacked. Dhuka's efforts to repel the new invasion were hampered by the reluctance of the provincial garrison at Fustat to fight, exacerbated by the habitual delays in their pay, forcing him to rely on volunteers at first. He nevertheless moved quickly to secure Giza, across the Nile from Fustat, by constructing a fort there. Soon after, however, the new fiscal administrator for Egypt, al-Husayn al-Madhara'i, arrived with sufficient funds to pay the regular troops their arrears.

Dhuka died on 1st August, and was succeeded by his predecessor Takin, who arrived to take up his office in January. Once more, the intervention of Mu'nis in the next year saved Fustat and threw the Fatimids out of the country.

== Sources ==
- Brett, Michael (2001). The Rise of the Fatimids: The World of the Mediterranean and the Middle East in the Fourth Century of the Hijra, Tenth Century CE. The Medieval Mediterranean. Vol. 30. Leiden: BRILL. ISBN 9004117415.
- Halm, Heinz (1996). The Empire of the Mahdi: The Rise of the Fatimids. Handbook of Oriental Studies. Translated by Michael Bonner. Leiden: BRILL. ISBN 9004100563.

Preceded by Takin al-Khazari	Abbasid Governor of Egypt; 915–919	Succeeded by Takin al-Khazari
