= Ibn Zulaq =

10th-century Egyptian historian

Abu Muhammad ibn al-Hasan ibn Ibrahim ibn Zulaq al-Laythi (c. 919–996), commonly known as Ibn Zulaq (or Ibn Zawlaq), was an Egyptian historian, whose work focuses on the local history of Egypt during the Ikhshidid dynasty and the early years of the Fatimid Caliphate there.

Ibn Zulaq was born in 918/9 in Egypt and died there in 996/7. Most of his work does not survive directly, but was extensively used and quoted by later historians such as Ibn Sa'id al-Maghribi (13th century), al-Maqrizi (15th century), and Ibn Hajar al-Asqalani (16th century).

His works included a history of the governors and judges of Egypt, which continued the similar work of the 9th-century polymath al-Kindi; a history of the al-Madhara'i family of viziers; and books on the founder of the Ikhshidid dynasty, Muhammad ibn Tughj al-Ikhshid and the Ikhshidid strongman Abu'l-Misk Kafur. His biography of al-Ikhshid in particular is stated to have been written at the request of his son Abu'l-Hasan Ali ibn al-Ikhshid (r. 961–966) at the beginning of his reign. Along with the numerous details that indicate inside knowledge, this shows that Ibn Zulaq was closely associated with the ruling circles of Egypt at the time. Ali richly rewarded Ibn Zulaq for his work, and it appears that he earned further commissions by other high-ranking members of the Ikhshidid elites for writing panegyrics for them.

Following the Fatimid conquest of Egypt in 969, like many reading figures of the Ikhshidid regime, Ibn Zulaq readily accommodated himself to the new regime, and retained his access to the circles of power, from the Caliph al-Mu'izz li-Din Allah (r. 953–975) to the vizier Ibn Killis. This allowed him to compose histories of al-Mu'izz, and possibly his successor al-Aziz Billah (r. 975–996) as well. A biography of the general Jawhar, who led the conquest, is quoted in later Isma'ili sources. Wladimir Ivanow considered that it was likely a part of his work on al-Mu'izz. Another work, comparing Egypt and Iraq, was likely commissioned by the Fatimids as a deliberate propaganda piece. According to the historian Yaacov Lev, it was aimed not only at "extolling Egypt, their new possession", but also "simultaneously belittling the importance of Iraq", seat of the rival Abbasid Caliphate and its Buyid overlords. His History of Egypt (Tārīkh Miṣr) was continued after his death, first by his son Abu'l-Husayn, and then by his grandson Abu'l-Husayn.

As an eyewitness with access to the ruling circles, Ibn Zulaq is the "most authoritative source" (Lev) on the Ikhshidids, the Fatimid conquest of Egypt and the early period of Fatimid rule there, but this very proximity to the same circles who sponsored his work, opens its veracity to doubt. Nevertheless, almost no other contemporary work survives that might be used to check his work against, and while the accounts of the 14th-century historians Baybars al-Mansuri and al-Nuwayri corroborate some of his information, it is unclear whether they too have not used Ibn Zulaq as a source.

== Sources ==
- Gottheil, Richard (1907). "Al-Ḥasan ibn Ibrāhīm ibn Zūlāḳ". Journal of the American Oriental Society. 28: 254–270. doi:10.2307/592773. JSTOR 592773.
- Lev, Yaacov (1979). "The Fāṭimid Conquest of Egypt — Military Political and Social Aspects". Israel Oriental Studies. 9: 315–328. ISSN 0334-4401.
- Lewis, B.; Ménage, V. L.; Pellat, Ch. & Schacht, J., eds. (1971). "Ibn Zūlāḳ". The Encyclopaedia of Islam, Second Edition. Volume III: H–Iram. Leiden: E. J. Brill. p. 979. OCLC 495469525.
- Sayyid, Ayman Fuʾād (1977). "Lumières nouvelles sur quelques sources de l'histoire fatimide en Egypte". Annales islamologiques. XIII: 1–41.
