= Tinnis =

Tennis ⲑⲉⲛⲛⲉⲥⲓ
- Location in Egypt
- Coordinates: 31°12′N 32°14′E
- Country: Egypt
- Governorate: Port Said
- Time zone: UTC+2 (EST)

Tennis or Tinnīs (Egyptian Arabic: تنيس, Coptic: ⲑⲉⲛⲛⲉⲥⲓ) was a medieval city in Egypt which no longer exists. It was most prosperous from the 9th century to the 11th century until its abandonment. It was located at 31°12′N 32°14′E, on an island in Lake Manzala, southwest of Port Said.

== Etymology ==
The city's name was taken from Lake Tinnis, Lake Manzala's name at the time.

== History ==
=== Prosperity ===
Tinnis was an important port, exporting agricultural products of Egypt, particularly textiles, of which itself is famed for producing throughout the Middle East, due to its geographical location served by the main eastern tributary of the Nile in medieval times, according to Muhammad al-Idrisi. By using the tributary, ships could enter the calmer waters of Lake Tinnis before entering the Mediterranean proper to avoid rough waves, which was a huge problem for ships at that era should they directly enter the sea, owing to the conditions at the mouth. The lake allowed for boats to wait out rough conditions unlike at Damietta or Rashid where the Nile empties directly into the sea, which made it a "port of the lands of Byzantium, the Frankish periphery, Cyprus, the whole length of the Levant coast and the entrepôts of Iraq" according to Ibn Zulaq. The independent section given to it by The book of curiosities, a set of important maps possibly made for the Abbasid caliph al-Ma'mun (r. 813–833) also testifies to its importance.

The 11th-century traveller Nasir Khusraw, who visited the city during the Fatimid Caliphate, reported that it was densely populated, with 50,000 inhabitants, 10,000 shops and two large Friday mosques. The population, mostly Christian Copts, were employed in weaving textiles which could fetch enormous prices: a simple linen garment could be sold for a hundred gold dinars, more elaborate ones fetched prices in the thousands. The state thus tightly regulated the production and sale of these textiles, which resulted in enormous proceeds for the Fatimid treasury. The specialty of Tinnis were dyed garments, especially of the type called buqalamun, spun from sea silk.

Fishing was a large part of the local culture, as it provided majority of the city's food supply. They had various boats, including fishing boats, shrimp-catchers boats, and carp-catchers boats of all sizes that would gather several types of fish like perch, catfish, eel, crab, herring, dolphins, tuna, or shark. There would also be boats were dedicated to catching birds, which could be consumed or exported. These birds were presumptively migrating, which allowed for them to be plump. Some of the birds that were caught included bats, robins, turtledoves, cranes, Egyptian vultures, geese, crows, owls, duck, and pelicans. The people of Tinnis also relief on grains throughout the year, including wheat, barley, and legumes. There were 160 mills that were used to grind, husk, and knead the grains throughout the year.

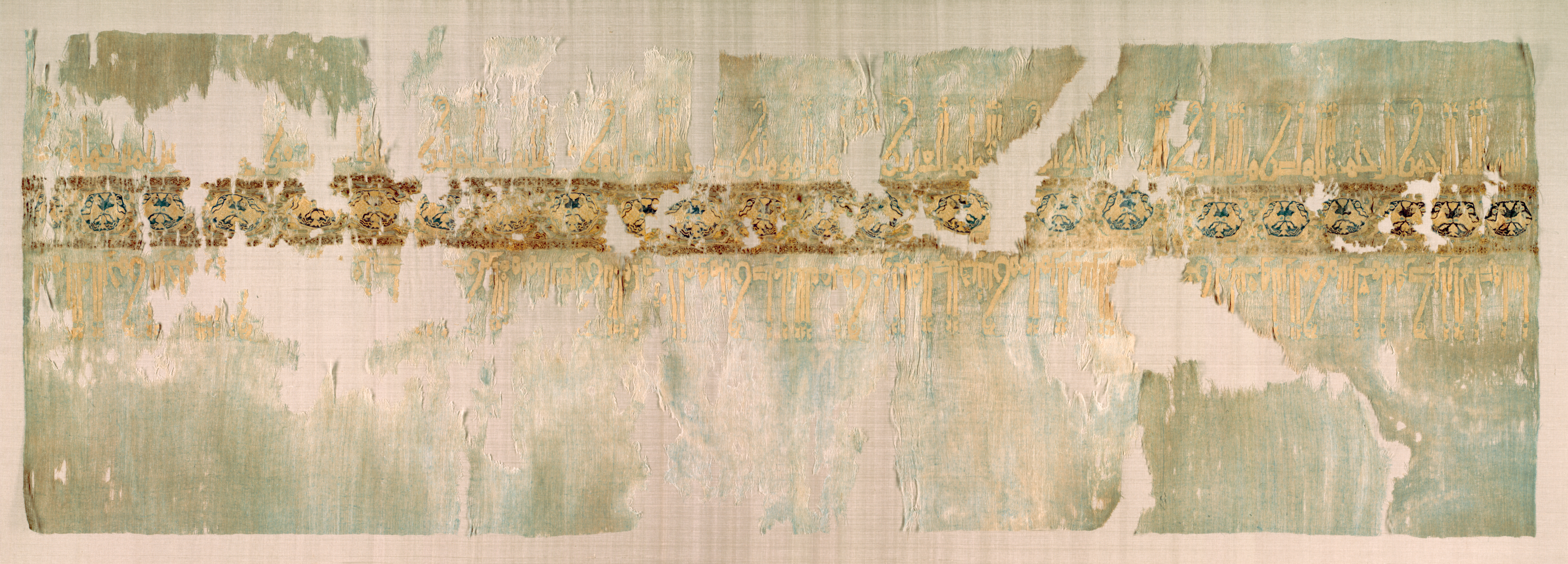
Pistachio colored textile from Tinnīs that is decorated with Arabic text in gold.

Tinnis had a prosperous market, with numerous large markets for merchants. There were over 2,500 shops, with 150 shops that specialized in textiles. Tinnīs had five-thousand weaving looms, which employed over ten thousand workers. Special textiles were also made such as woven gilded clothes, velvet, and silken cloth embroidered with gold, would be used for numerous applications, including as headdresses, sofas, chairs, canopies, and curtains.

=== Culture and entertainment ===
Muhammad ibn Ahmad ibn Salim, who was a market inspector in Tinnīs noted that the city had healthy air which allowed for its inhabitants to have fine and pleasant lives. The people of Tīnnis were known to be generous and wholesome companions, who were very satisfied with their life without hardship. The joy and happiness throughout the city were also generated from listening to music and traveling. People in Tinnīs would entertain themselves through creative activities such as painting, drawing, embroidery, or dyeing textiles. They would also travel when possible and were known to be very friendly to other travelers and outsiders.

The people of Tinnīs primarily practiced Islam, with 167 prayer areas and mosques with minarets reported around the city. There were also 72 churches that were used by Christians in Tinnīs. However, they were persecuted under al-Hakim bi-Amr Allah in 1012–1013. The churches were then destroyed and replaced with mosques.

=== Abandonment ===
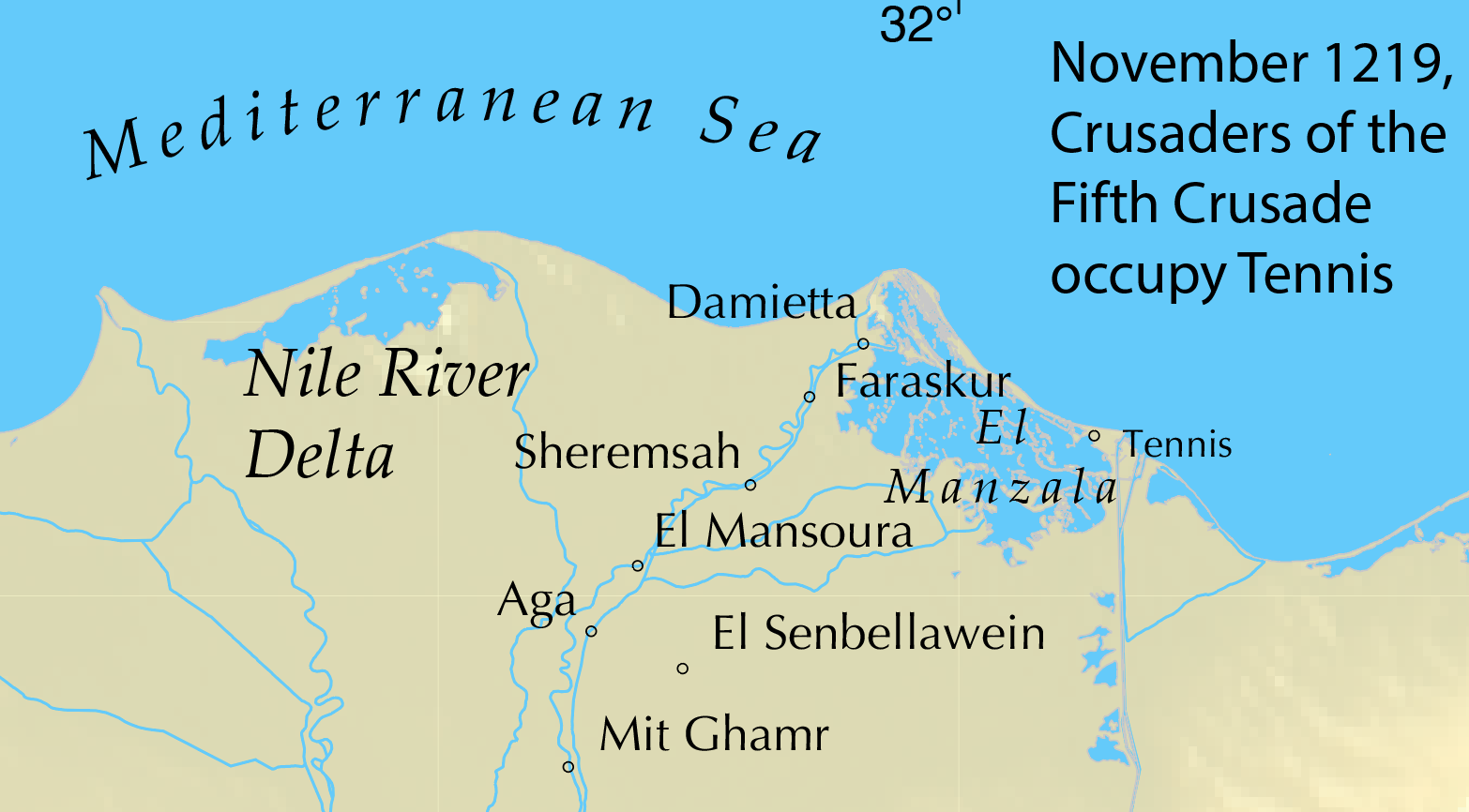

The city's outward location, that makes water difficult to come by, as well as cramped conditions were negatives. Moreover, its outward location meant difficulty defending it against seaborne enemies, especially the crusaders. In 1192–93 Saladin ordered the abandonment of the civic settlement, leaving only a military fort whilst commerce was moved to the more defensible port of Damietta. Following the siege of Damietta, Egyptian authorities razed the fort.
