= Abu Ja'far Ahmad ibn Nasr =

Abu Ja'far Ahmad ibn Nasr (Arabic: أبوجعفر أحمد بن نصر) was an Egyptian merchant and Isma'ili dāʿī. He operated openly as the head of the pro-Fatimid propaganda in Fustat, the capital of Egypt, during the last years of Ikhshidid rule, and played a major role in preparing the quick and relatively bloodless Fatimid conquest of Egypt in 969.

== Sources ==
- Bianquis, Thierry (1998). "Autonomous Egypt from Ibn Ṭūlūn to Kāfūr, 868–969". In Petry, Carl F. (ed.). The Cambridge History of Egypt, Volume 1: Islamic Egypt, 640–1517. Vol. 1. Cambridge: Cambridge University Press. pp. 86–119. ISBN 0-521-47137-0.
- Halm, Heinz (1991). Das Reich des Mahdi: Der Aufstieg der Fatimiden [The Empire of the Mahdi: The Rise of the Fatimids] (in German). Munich: C. H. Beck. ISBN 978-3-406-35497-7.
