= Ibn Tufayl Foundation for Arabic Studies =

The Ibn Tufayl Foundation for Arabic Studies (Spanish: Fundación Ibn Tufayl de Estudios Árabes) is a cultural foundation, whose main purpose is to promote and conduct research projects related to the Arabic language, its literature, the history of the Arab World and the history of Al-Andalus.

The Foundation was established on July 7, 2003 and currently has over a hundred fellows and external collaborators of different nationalities in varied academic fields. The foundation headquarters are located in the city of Almería, Spain.

== See also ==
- Biblioteca de al-Andalus
