= Abu Muzahim Musa ibn Ubayd Allah al-Khaqani =

Islamic scholar and traditionalist in Baghdad

Abū Muzaḥim Mūsā ibn ʿUbayd Allāh ibn Yaḥyā ibn Khāqān, also called al-Khāqānī (died AD 937 [AH 325]), was an Islamic scholar and muḥaddith (traditionist) in Baghdad. He belonged to the abnāʾ al-dawla and his family was of Iranian origin. His father was the Abbasid vizier ʿUbayd Allāh al-Khāqānī (died 877), while his brother Muḥammad also served as vizier. Sources for his life include al-Khaṭīb al-Baghdādī's Taʾrīkh Baghdād, Ibn al-Samʿānī's Ansāb and al-Dhahabī's Siyar.

Al-Khāqānī wrote the earliest work on tajwīd, the proper Arabic pronunciation for reciting the Qurʾān. Known as al-Qaṣida al-Khāqāniyya, it is in the form of a qaṣīda. As the word tajwīd was not yet in use, he refers to ḥusn al-adāʾ (pleasant pronunciation). In the 11th century, Abū ʿAmr al-Dānī wrote a commentary on it, the Sharḥ al-Qaṣīda al-Khāqāniyya.

== Works cited ==
- Fesharaki, Mohammad Ali Lesani (2015). "Abū ʿAmr al-Dānī". In Farhad Daftary (ed.). Encyclopaedia Islamica. Translated by Saeed Saeedpoor. Brill Online. doi:10.1163/1875-9831_isla_SIM_0042.
- Gordon, Matthew S. (2001). "The Khāqānid Families of the Early ʿAbbasid Period". Journal of the American Oriental Society. 121 (2): 236–255. doi:10.2307/606563. JSTOR 606563.
- Koyuncu, Recep (2017). "Kur'ân Eğitiminde Manzûm Tecvid Geleneği: Cemzûrî ve Tuhfetü'l-Eṭfâl Adlı Manzûm Eseri" [Poetical Tajwīd in the Education of the Qur'an: Jamzūrī and His Work Tuḥfat al-Aṭfâl]. Cumhuriyet İlahyat Dergisi. 21 (3): 1497–1533. CEEOL 595018
- Nöldeke, Theodor; Schwally, Friedrich; Bergsträßer, Gotthelf; Pretzl, Otto (2013). The History of the Qurʾān. Translated by Wolfgang H. Behn. Brill.
