= Takin al-Khazari =

10th-century Abbasid governor of Egypt

Takin al-Khassa Abu Mansur Takin ibn Abdallah al-Harbi al-Khazari (Arabic: تكين الخزري; died 16 March 933) was an Abbasid commander of Khazar origin who served thrice as governor of Egypt.

He grew up and became an officer under Caliph al-Mu'tadid (r. 892–902). He was appointed governor of Egypt in August 910, succeeding Isa al-Nushari, and remained in the post until 31 May 915, when he was deposed by Mu'nis al-Muzaffar due to his failure to contain the Fatimid invasion of the province, and replaced with Dhuka al-Rumi.

He was re-appointed to the post in autumn 919, after the death of Dhuka, again in the midst of a second Fatimid invasion. He arrived at Fustat on 6 January 920. Once more, thanks to the intervention of an army under Mu'nis and a fleet under Thamal al-Dulafi, the Fatimid invasion was repulsed, with the last Fatimid troops abandoning the Fayyum Oasis and fleeing across the desert on 8 July 921. Takin was replaced on 22 July, but reinstated briefly a few days later.

His third and longest tenure began on March/April 924 and lasted until his own death on 16 March 933.

== Sources ==
- Halm, Heinz (1996). The Empire of the Mahdi: The Rise of the Fatimids. Handbook of Oriental Studies. Vol. 26. Translated by Michael Bonner. Leiden: BRILL. ISBN 9004100563.
- Rosenthal, Franz, ed. (1985). The History of al-Ṭabarī, Volume XXXVIII: The Return of the Caliphate to Baghdad: The Caliphates of al-Muʿtaḍid, al-Muktafī and al-Muqtadir, A.D. 892–915/A.H. 279–302. SUNY Series in Near Eastern Studies. Albany, New York: State University of New York Press. ISBN 978-0-87395-876-9.

Preceded by Isa al-Nushari	Abbasid Governor of Egypt; 910–915	Succeeded by Dhuka al-Rumi
Preceded by Dhuka al-Rumi	Abbasid Governor of Egypt; 919–921	Succeeded by Abu'l-Hasan Hilal ibn Badr
Preceded by Ahmad ibn Kayghalagh	Abbasid Governor of Egypt; 924–933	Succeeded by Ahmad ibn Kayghalagh
