= Mohammad Taher Khaqani =

Iraqi Twelver Shi'a Marja (born 1940)

Ayatollah al-Udhma Sheikh Mohammad Mohammad Taher Al Shubayr al-Khaqani
- اية الله العظمى الشيخ محمد محمد طاهر آل شبير الخاقاني
- Ayatollah Sheikh Mohammad Mohammad Taher Al-Shubayr al-Khaqani in his office in Najaf.

Personal life
- Born: 1940 (age 85–86) Najaf, Iraq
- Parent: Mohammad-Taher Shubayr al-Khaqani (father)
- Relatives: Mohammad Baqir al-Khaqani brother Mohammad Kadhem al-Khaqani brother Isa al-Khaqani uncle
- Website: www.alkhakani.net/arabic/

Religious life
- Religion: Islam
- School: Ja'fari
- Sect: Shia

Muslim leader
- Based in: Najaf

Grand Ayatollah Mohammad Mohammad Taher Al Shubayr al-Khaqani (Arabic: محمد محمد طاهر آل شبير الخاقاني) (born 1940) is an Iraqi Twelver Shi'a Marja.

He has studied in seminaries of Najaf, Iraq under Grand Ayatollah Abul-Qassim Khoei and Mohammad-Reza Golpaygani.

== See also ==
- List of maraji
- Bada'
- Ismailism
