= Ubayd Allah ibn Yahya ibn Khaqan =

9th-century Abbasid vizier and court official

Ubayd Allah ibn Yahya ibn Khaqan عبيد الله بن يحيى بن خاقان
- Born: Abbasid Caliphate
- Died: 5 August 877; Samarra, Abbasid Caliphate
- Occupations: Abbasid vizier and court official
- Years active: Under al-Mutawakkil from (851 to 861); Under al-Mu'tamid from (870 to 877)
- Known for: Tutor to one of al-Mutawakkil's sons.
- Children: Muhammad ibn Ubayd Allah al-Khaqani; Abu Muzahim Musa ibn Ubayd Allah al-Khaqani
- Father: Yahya ibn Khaqan

Abū al-Ḥasan ʿUbayd Allāh ibn Yaḥyā ibn Khāqān (Arabic: أبو الحسن عبيد الله بن يحيى بن خاقان) was an Abbasid official who served twice as vizier, under caliphs al-Mutawakkil and al-Mu'tamid.

== Life ==
Ubayd Allah's father, Yahya, was a Khurasani from Marw in the service of al-Hasan ibn Sahl, the vizier to Caliph al-Ma'mun (r. 813–833). His career culminated under Caliph al-Mutawakkil (r. 847–861) as head of the dīwān al-kharāj and director of the tribunal of maẓālim ("grievances"). Thus, Ubayd Allah enjoyed the favour of al-Mutawakkil, who appointed him as his private secretary. In ca. 851, the Caliph appointed Ubayd Allah to the vizierate, which had been vacant for some time, and granted his protégé significant powers, in particular as regards the appointment of officials, thereby establishing his control over the administrative apparatus. In addition, Ubayd Allah also served as tutor to one of al-Mutawakkil's sons. Throughout the reign, Ubayd Allah played a major role and was, along with al-Fath ibn Khaqan (no relation), one of the main influences on the Caliph, particularly as a driving force behind al-Mutawakkil's anti-Alid policies. During his tenure, he is known to have promoted the career of Ahmad ibn Tulun, the future founder of the Tulunid dynasty. With the aid of his aides al-Hasan ibn Makhlad and Musa ibn Abd al-Malik, he was instrumental in the downfall of the head of the dīwān al-tawqīʿ (a bureau responsible for drafting edicts and registering government officials), Najah ibn Salamah, in early 860. Najah and his sons were imprisoned and their possessions confiscated, while Najah died in prison on 18 February 860.

Along with al-Fath ibn Khaqan, Ubayd Allah supported al-Mutawakkil's intention to entrust his son al-Mu'tazz as his successor, over al-Muntasir, who was backed by the Turkish and Maghariba guard troops. On the night of 10 December 861, when the Turks—certainly with the tacit approval, if not instigation, of al-Muntasir—murdered al-Mutawwakil and al-Fath ibn Khaqan, Ubayd Allah was saved because he was still working late at his office. After hearing the commotion and learning of what had transpired, Ubayd Allah and his entourage escaped the palace—they had to break down the locked doors to do so—and, reaching the banks of the Tigris, took boats to the downriver residence of al-Mu'tazz. They were too late, however, as al-Mu'tazz had been duped into going to the palace and acknowledging his brother as caliph. According to one report in al-Tabari, Ubayd Allah and al-Fath ibn Khaqan had been forewarned of the plot by a Turkish woman, but had disregarded it, confident that no-one would dare carry it out. Following the murder of al-Mutawakkil, Ubayd Allah withdrew from politics, and in 862–867 was even exiled to Barqa. On the accession of al-Mu'tamid (r. 870–892) in June 870, he was re-appointed vizier, keeping the post until his death. According to Ibn al-Jawzi, he died on 5 August 877 from a blow received during a polo match.

The famous historian al-Tabari was tutor to Ubayd Allah's sons, reportedly at ten gold dinars a month. One of his sons, Muhammad, also became vizier in 912–913, and was an enemy of Ali ibn al-Furat. Muhammad's son Abdallah also served briefly as vizier in 924–925. Another son, Musa, became a scholar.

== Sources ==
- Gordon, Matthew S. (2001b). "The Khāqānid Families of the Early ʿAbbasid Period". Journal of the American Oriental Society. 121 (2): 236–255. JSTOR 606563.
- Gordon, Matthew S. (2001). The Breaking of a Thousand Swords: A History of the Turkish Military of Samarra (A.H. 200–275/815–889 C.E.). Albany, New York: State University of New York Press. ISBN 0-7914-4795-2.
- Kennedy, Hugh (2006). When Baghdad Ruled the Muslim World: The Rise and Fall of Islam's Greatest Dynasty. Cambridge, Massachusetts: Da Capo Press. ISBN 978-0-306814808.
- Kraemer, Joel L., ed. (1989). The History of al-Ṭabarī, Volume XXXIV: Incipient Decline: The Caliphates of al-Wāthiq, al-Mutawakkil and al-Muntaṣir, A.D. 841–863/A.H. 227–248. SUNY Series in Near Eastern Studies. Albany, New York: State University of New York Press. ISBN 978-0-88706-874-4.
- Sourdel, D. (1971). "Ibn K̲h̲āḳān". In Lewis, B.; Ménage, V. L.; Pellat, Ch. & Schacht, J. (eds.). The Encyclopaedia of Islam, Second Edition. Volume III: H–Iram. Leiden: E. J. Brill. p. 824. doi:10.1163/1573-3912_islam_COM_0329. OCLC 495469525.

Vacant Title last held by Muhammad ibn al-Fadl al-Jarjara'i	Vizier of the Abbasid Caliphate; 851–861	Succeeded by Ahmad ibn al-Khasib al-Jarjara'i
Preceded by Sulayman ibn Wahb	Vizier of the Abbasid Caliphate; 870–877	Succeeded by al-Hasan ibn Makhlad
