= Abdallah ibn Muhammad al-Khaqani =

Abbasid vizier from 924 to 925

Abdallah ibn Muhammad al-Khaqani عبدالله بن محمد الخاقاني
- Born: Abbasid Caliphate
- Died: c. 926/7; Baghdad, Abbasid Caliphate
- Occupations: Abbasid vizier and court official
- Years active: June 924 – November 925
- Father: Muhammad ibn Ubayd Allah al-Khaqani
- Relatives: Ubayd Allah ibn Yahya ibn Khaqan (grandfather)

Abu'l-Qāsim Abdallāh ibn Muḥammad al-Khāqānī (Arabic: أبو القاسم عبدالله بن محمد الخاقاني) was a son of the Abbasid vizier Muhammad ibn Ubayd Allah al-Khaqani, under whose vizierate in 912–913 he actually ran the government, before becoming vizier himself in 924–925.

== Life ==
He was the son of Muhammad ibn Ubayd Allah al-Khaqani, vizier from 912 to 913, and grandson of Ubayd Allah ibn Yahya ibn Khaqan, vizier from 851 to 861 and 870 to 877. He served as a secretary under his father during the latter's vizierate, along with his brother Abd al-Wahid. During his father's vizierate, Abdallah supervised the actual administration, while his father was busy trying to secure his own position at court. Nevertheless, the contemporary historians are unanimous in describing Abdallah and his father as both indolent and incompetent. So haphazard was the governance during this time that the historian Miskawayh relates that seven governors were appointed to the same district within 20 days, and they all met by chance in the same inn on their way to take up their post.

Despite the failure of this first tenure, in June 924 Abdallah became vizier himself, in succession to Ali ibn al-Furat, who was disgraced and executed following the Qarmatian sack of Basra and the destruction of the Hajj caravan during the previous year. He was unable to deal with the challenges facing the Abbasid government at the time, and was dismissed in November 925, on the insistence of the commander-in-chief Mu'nis al-Muzaffar, who at the time was the virtual regent of the Caliphate. As was customary, he was imprisoned and forced to pay a fine. Released, he died in 926/7.

== Sources ==
- Bowen, H. (1993). "Muʾnis al-Muẓaffar". In Bosworth, C. E.; van Donzel, E.; Heinrichs, W. P. & Pellat, Ch. (eds.). The Encyclopaedia of Islam, Second Edition. Volume VII: Mif–Naz. Leiden: E. J. Brill. p. 575. doi:10.1163/1573-3912_islam_SIM_5520. ISBN 978-90-04-09419-2.
- Kennedy, Hugh (2013). "The Reign of al-Muqtadir (295–320/908–32): A History". Crisis and Continuity at the Abbasid Court: Formal and Informal Politics in the Caliphate of al-Muqtadir (295-320/908-32). Leiden: Brill. pp. 13–47. ISBN 978-90-04-25271-4.
- Sourdel, D. (1971). "Ibn K̲h̲āḳān". In Lewis, B.; Ménage, V. L.; Pellat, Ch. & Schacht, J. (eds.). The Encyclopaedia of Islam, Second Edition. Volume III: H–Iram. Leiden: E. J. Brill. p. 824. doi:10.1163/1573-3912_islam_COM_0329. OCLC 495469525.
- van Berkel, Maaike (2013). "The Vizier". Crisis and Continuity at the Abbasid Court: Formal and Informal Politics in the Caliphate of al-Muqtadir (295-320/908-32). Leiden: Brill. pp. 65–86. ISBN 978-90-04-25271-4.

Preceded by Ali ibn al-Furat	Vizier of the Abbasid Caliphate; 15 June 924 – 30 November 925	Succeeded by Ahmad al-Khasibi
