= Mohammad-Taher Shubayr al-Khaqani =

Iranian Arab Shia cleric

Ayatollah al-Udhma Sheikh Mohammad-Taher Shubayr al-Khaqani
- اية الله العظمى الشيخ محمد طاهر آل شبير الخاقاني
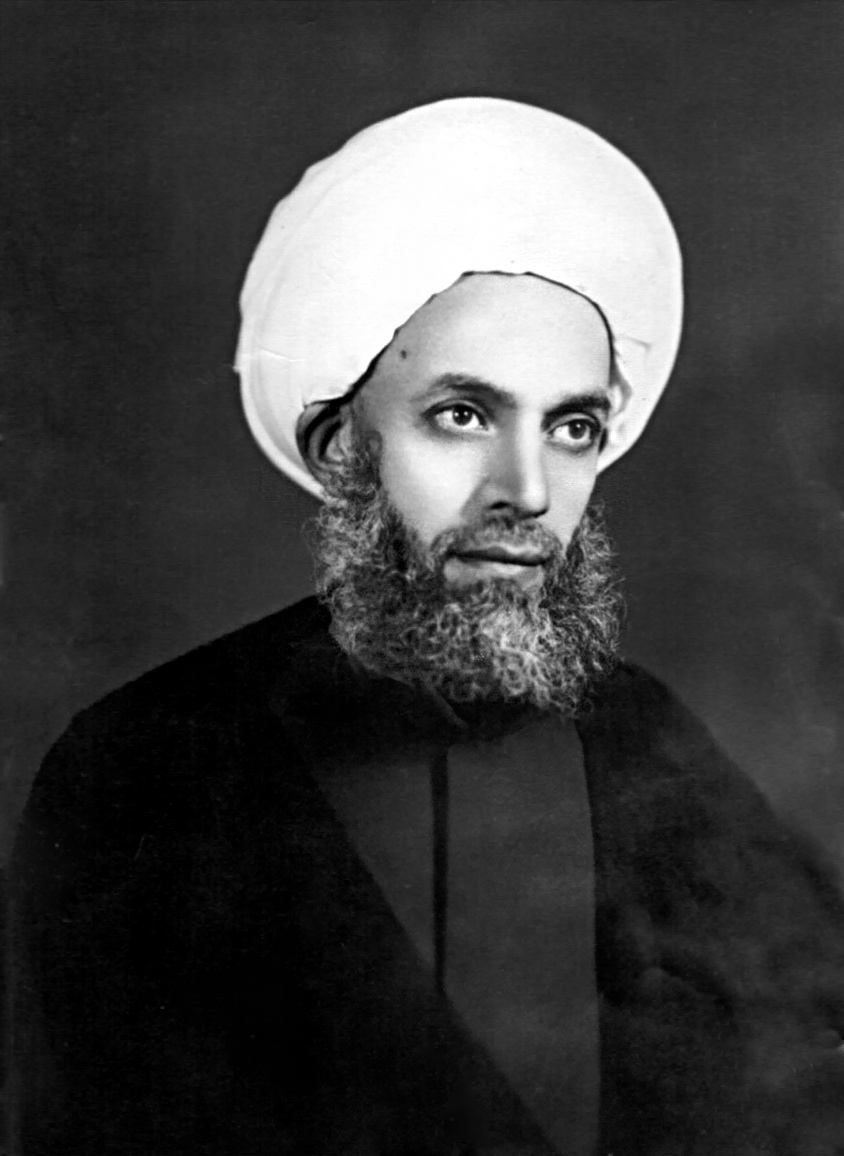
- Portrait of Ayatollah al-Khaqani

Personal life
- Born: محمد طاهر بن عبدالحميد بن عيسى بن حسن بن شبير بن ذياب بن محمد بن حرب الخاقاني; Muhammad Taher bin Abdulhamid bin Isa bin Hassan bin Shubayr bin Dhiab bin Muhammad bin Harb al-Khaqani; 30 November 1911 Muhammara, Emirate of Muhammara
- Died: 28 January 1986 (aged 74) Fatima Masumeh Shrine, Qom, Iran
- Children: Mohammad Baqir al-Khaqani Mohammad Taher Khaqani Mohammad Kadhem al-Khaqani
- Relatives: Isa al-Khaqani - Brother

Religious life
- Religion: Islam
- School: Jafari
- Sect: Shia

Grand Ayatollah Sheikh Mohammed Taher bin Abdul-Hameed bin Isa bin Hasan bin Shubayr bin Dhiab bin Mohammed bin Harb al-Khaqani (30 November 1911 - 28 January 1986) (Arabic:اية الله العظمى الشيخ محمد طاهر بن عبدالحميد بن عيسى بن حسن بن شبير بن ذياب بن محمد بن حرب الخاقاني). He was a leading Ahwazi Arab Shia cleric from Muhammara. Following the 1979 Iranian Revolution, he was arrested by the new Iranian authorities, transferred to Qom and was placed under house arrest until his death in 1986. His persecution followed his advocacy for the political and national rights of the Ahwazi Arab population and his opposition to Khomeini’s theory of Wilayat al-Faqih.

Sheikh al-Khaqani belonged to the Banu Khaqan (بنو خاقان), an Arab Tribe whose lineage is traced to Himyar of Qahtan in Yemen. According to Musa Sayadat’s The Geographical History of the Arabs of Khuzestan, which can be viewed on Hamed Kenani’s digital library (Item 127), the Banu Khaqan migrated from Yemen to Iraq, before subsequently migrating to Arabistan, where branches of the tribe settled in Muhammara and Abadan. The genealogy of the Al Sheikh Dhiab (آل شيخ ذياب) family which Sheikh al-Khaqani’s house (بيت) Al Shubayr (آل شبير) is from traces its descent through Jabir ibn Khaqan ibn Himyar.

His son, Grand Ayatollah Sheikh Mohammad Mohammad Taher al-Khaqani today lives in Najaf, Iraq, his other son Ayatollah Sheikh Mohammed Kadhem al-Khaqani lives in the United Kingdom, his other son, Sheikh Mohammed Baqir al-Khaqani, lives in Kuwait, and his younger brother Sheikh Isa Al-Khaqani lives in Bahrain.
