= Biblioteca de al-Andalus =

Spanish-language encyclopedia about Islamic Iberia

Biblioteca de al-Andalus is a standard encyclopaedia of the academic discipline of Al-Andalus studies.

It embraces articles on various aspects of cultural life in Al-Andalus, through the biographies of around 2,400 authors and a detailed study of over 10,000 texts, focused on different fields of knowledge (literature, Islamic Law, the Quran, linguistics, history, philosophy, medicine, astronomy, etc.).

It is the first reference work published by the Fundación Ibn Tufayl de Estudios Árabes within the Al-Andalus Culture Encyclopaedia project.

- Biblioteca de al-Andalus
  - Lirola Delgado, Jorge; Puerta Vílchez, José Miguel, eds. (2012). Biblioteca de al-Andalus. Vol. 1. De Al-Abbadiya a Ibn Abyad (in Spanish). Almería: Fundación Ibn Tufayl de Estudios Árabes. ISBN 978-84-936751-4-1.
  - Lirola Delgado, Jorge; Puerta Vílchez, José Miguel, eds. (2009). Biblioteca de al-Andalus. Vol. 2. De Ibn Adhà a Ibn Busrà (in Spanish). Almería: Fundación Ibn Tufayl de Estudios Árabes. ISBN 978-84-934026-6-2.
  - Lirola Delgado, Jorge; Puerta Vílchez, José Miguel, eds. (2004). Biblioteca de al-Andalus. Vol. 3. De Ibn al-Dabbag a Ibn Kurz (in Spanish). Almería: Fundación Ibn Tufayl de Estudios Árabes. ISBN 978-84-934026-1-7.
  - Lirola Delgado, Jorge; Puerta Vílchez, José Miguel, eds. (2006). Biblioteca de al-Andalus. Vol. 4. De Ibn al-Labbana a Ibn al-Ruyuli (in Spanish). Almería: Fundación Ibn Tufayl de Estudios Árabes. ISBN 978-84-934026-2-4.
  - Lirola Delgado, Jorge; Puerta Vílchez, José Miguel, eds. (2007). Biblioteca de al-Andalus. Vol. 5. De Ibn Sa'ada a Ibn Wuhayb (in Spanish). Almería: Fundación Ibn Tufayl de Estudios Árabes. ISBN 978-84-934026-5-5.
  - Lirola Delgado, Jorge; Puerta Vílchez, José Miguel, eds. (2009). Biblioteca de al-Andalus. Vol. 6. De Ibn al-Yabbab a Nubdat al-'Asr (in Spanish). Almería: Fundación Ibn Tufayl de Estudios Árabes. ISBN 978-84-934026-8-6.
  - Lirola Delgado, Jorge; Puerta Vílchez, José Miguel, eds. (2012). Biblioteca de al-Andalus. Vol. 7. De al-Talamanki a Zumurrud (in Spanish). Almería: Fundación Ibn Tufayl de Estudios Árabes. ISBN 978-84-936751-2-7.
  - Lirola Delgado, Jorge, ed. (2012). Biblioteca de al-Andalus. Vol. A. Apéndices (in Spanish). Almería: Fundación Ibn Tufayl de Estudios Árabes. ISBN 978-84-936751-5-8.
  - Lirola Delgado, Jorge, ed. (2012). Biblioteca de al-Andalus. Vol. B. Balance de resultados e índices (in Spanish). Almería: Fundación Ibn Tufayl de Estudios Árabes. ISBN 978-84-940313-8-0.
  - Padillo Saoud, Abdenour; Lirola Delgado, Jorge; Al Alouni, Jaafar (2017). Biblioteca de al-Andalus. Vol. C: El poder y los intelectuales en al-Andalus. Cronología (in Spanish). Almería: Fundación Ibn Tufayl de Estudios Árabes. ISBN 978-84-16134-01-4.
