= Muhammad ibn Ubayd Allah al-Khaqani =

10th-century Abbasid vizier and court official

Muhammad ibn Ubayd Allah al-Khaqani محمد بن عبيد الله الخاقاني
- Born: Abbasid Caliphate
- Died: c. 924/5; Baghdad, Abbasid Caliphate
- Occupations: Abbasid vizier and Court official
- Years active: July 912 – August 913
- Known for: Student of the famous historian al-Tabari
- Children: Abdallah ibn Muhammad al-Khaqani
- Father: Ubayd Allah ibn Yahya ibn Khaqan

Abū ʿAlī Muḥammad ibn ʿUbayd Allāh al-Khāqānī (Arabic: محمد بن عبيد الله الخاقاني) was a senior official of the Abbasid Caliphate, who served as vizier from 912 to 913.

He was the son of the distinguished Ubayd Allah ibn Yahya ibn Khaqan, who served twice as vizier, under the caliphs al-Mutawakkil and al-Mu'tamid. The famous historian al-Tabari was his tutor, reportedly being paid ten gold dinars a month. A rival of Ali ibn al-Furat, he succeeded the latter as vizier to Caliph al-Muqtadir on 23 July 912, and remained in office until 16 August 913. His tenure was marked by attempts to shore up finances through imposing heavy fines on dismissed officials of the Banu'l-Furat faction, and by a pro-Hanbali stance that led to anti-Shi'ite measures. After his dismissal, he was imprisoned by his successor Ali ibn Isa al-Jarrah, and by his rival Ibn al-Furat when the latter again became vizier in 917. He died in 924/5. His son Abdallah also briefly served as vizier in 924–925.

== Sources ==
- Kraemer, Joel L., ed. (1989). The History of al-Ṭabarī, Volume XXXIV: Incipient Decline: The Caliphates of al-Wāthiq, al-Mutawakkil and al-Muntaṣir, A.D. 841–863/A.H. 227–248. SUNY Series in Near Eastern Studies. Albany, New York: State University of New York Press. ISBN 978-0-88706-874-4.
- Sourdel, D. (1971). "Ibn K̲h̲āḳān". In Lewis, B.; Ménage, V. L.; Pellat, Ch. & Schacht, J. (eds.). The Encyclopaedia of Islam, Second Edition. Volume III: H–Iram. Leiden: E. J. Brill. p. 824. doi:10.1163/1573-3912_islam_COM_0329. OCLC 495469525.
- van Berkel, Maaike; El Cheikh, Nadia Maria; Kennedy, Hugh; Osti, Letizia (2013). Crisis and Continuity at the Abbasid Court: Formal and Informal Politics in the Caliphate of al-Muqtadir (295-320/908-32). Leiden: BRILL. ISBN 978-90-04-25271-4.

Preceded by Ali ibn al-Furat	Vizier of the Abbasid Caliphate; 23 July 912 – 16 August 913	Succeeded by Ali ibn Isa al-Jarrah
