= Yaacov Lev =

Israeli historian

Yaacov Lev (Hebrew: יעקב לב) is an Israeli historian of the medieval Middle East, with focus on the Islamic states of the region, particularly Egypt.

Born in 1948, he studied at the University of Manchester, where he completed his Ph.D. in 1978. He then worked as professor of the Department of Middle Eastern Studies at Bar-Ilan University.

== Major works ==
- "Persecutions and Conversions to Islam in Eleventh-Century Egypt". Asian and African Studies. 22. Israel Oriental Society: 73–91. 1988.
- "The Suppression of Crime, the Supervision of Markets, and Urban Society in the Egyptian Capital during the Tenth and Eleventh Centuries". Mediterranean Historical Review. 3 (2): 71–95. doi:10.1080/09518968808569551.
- State and Society in Fatimid Egypt. Leiden: Brill. 1991. ISBN 90-04-09344-3.
- War and Society in the Eastern Mediterranean: 7th–15th Centuries. Leiden: Brill. 1997. ISBN 90-04-10032-6.
- Saladin in Egypt. Leiden, Boston, Köln: Brill. 1999. ISBN 90-04-11221-9.
- Charity, Endowments, and Charitable Institutions in Medieval Islam. Gainesville: University Press of Florida. 2006. ISBN 0-81302869-8.
- Towns and Material Culture in the Medieval Middle East. Leiden, Boston, Cologne: Brill. 2002. ISBN 90-04-47615-6.
- "The Fāṭimid caliphate (358–567/969–1171) and the Ayyūbids in Egypt (567–648/1171–1250)". The New Cambridge History of Islam, Volume 1: The Formation of the Islamic World, Sixth to Eleventh Centuries. Cambridge: Cambridge University Press. ISBN 978-0-521-83823-8.
- The Administration of Justice in Medieval Egypt: From the 7th to the 12th Century. Edinburgh: Edinburgh University Press. 2021. ISBN 1-47445924-2.
