= Sabir =

Sabir or Sobir may refer to:

== Given name ==
=== Sabir ===
- Sabir Agougil (born 2002), Dutch footballer
- Sabirzhan Akkalykov (born 2002), Kazakh boxer
- Sabir Ali, multiple people
- Sabir Ali Baloch, Pakistani politician
- Sabir Bougrine (born 1996), Moroccan footballer
- Sabir Butt (born 1969), Kenyan-Canadian squash player
- Sabir al-Fata, Fatimid governor and admiral
- Sabir Ganjali (1932–2025), Azerbaijani writer, journalist, publicist, and historian
- Sabir Gusein-Zade (born 1950), Russian mathematician
- Sabir Hussain (born 1983), Pakistani first-class cricketer
- Sabirul Islam (born 1990), British entrepreneur, author, and motivational speaker
- Sabir Khamzin (born 1972), Russian footballer
- Sabir Khan (Indian cricketer) (born 2000), Indian cricketer
- Sabir Khan (musician) (born 1987), Indian sarangi player
- Sabir Mahfouz Lahmar (born 1969), Bosnian-French Guantanamo detainee
- Sabir Mateen (born 1951), American musician and composer
- Sabir Muhammad (born 1976), American swimmer
- Sabir Pirzada, Pakistani-American television and comics writer and producer
- Sabir Hussain Qaimkhani (born 1970), Pakistani politician
- Sabir Rakhimov (1902–1945), Soviet Army general
- Sabir Rizayev (1924–1978), Azerbaijani screenwriter, art scholar, theater, and film critic
- Sabir Rustamkhanli (born 1946), Azerbaijani poet, philologist, and politician
- Sabirzhan Ruziyev (1953–2026), Uzbek fencer
- Sabir Shah (died 1748), Indian Sufi mystic
- Sabir Shaikh (1943–2014), Indian politician
- Sabir Zafar (born 1949), Pakistani poet
- Sabir Zazai (born 1974), British-Afghan refugee advocate
- Sabir Zeynalov (born 2005), Azerbaijani para taekwondo practitioner

=== Sobir ===
- Sobir Abdulla (1905–1972), Soviet-Uzbek writer, poet, playwright, and translator
- Sobir Kamolov (1910–1990), Soviet-Uzbek politician
- Sobirjon Nazarov (born 1991), Tajik boxer
- Sobir Odilov (1932–2002), Soviet-Uzbek architect
- Sobirjon Safaroliev (born 2002), Uzbek rower
- Sobir Yunusov (1909–1995), Soviet-Uzbek chemist

== Surname ==
- Adib Sabir (died 1143), Persian poet
- Agha Sabir (born 1981), Pakistani cricketer
- Ayub Sabir (1940–2022), Pakistani writer
- Irfan Sabir (born 1977), Canadian lawyer and politician
- Kenny Sabir (born 1975), Australian musician
- Mirza Alakbar Sabir (1862–1911), Azerbaijani satirical poet and teacher
- Mohammad Sabir (disambiguation), several people
- Mohammed Sabir (1939–2024), British businessman
- Naeem Sabir (died 2011), Pakistani human rights activist
- Nazir Sabir, Pakistani mountaineer
- Rafiq Sabir (1950–2026), Iraqi poet
- Rafiq Abdus Sabir (born 1954/55), American doctor convicted of supporting terrorism
- Rashid Sabir (1945–2012), Pakistani film, TV, radio, and stage artist
- Sahib Shah Sabir (1956–2007), Pakistani poet
- Sharif Sabir (1928–2015), Pakistani scholar and poet

== Places ==
- Jabal Sabir, a mountain in Yemen
- Sabir, Azerbaijan (disambiguation), the name of several places

== Other ==
- Sabir people, 5th–7th century nomadic people who lived in the north of the Caucasus
- Sabir language, or Mediterranean Lingua Franca, a pidgin language
