= Sabir, Azerbaijan =

Sabir, Azerbaijan may refer to:

- Nəbiağalı
- Sabir, Shamakhi
- Sabirkənd, Shamkir
- Səbir
