= Fatimid navy =

Navy of the Fatimid Caliphate

- Dates active: 909–1171
- Allegiance: Fatimid Caliphate
- Active regions: Mediterranean Sea, Nile, Red Sea
- Ideology: Isma'ilism, Jihad
- Wars: the Arab–Byzantine wars, the wars of expansion of the Fatimid Caliphate, and the Crusades

The navy of the Fatimid Caliphate was one of the most developed early Muslim navies and a major force in the central and eastern Mediterranean in the 10th–12th centuries. As with the dynasty it served, its history is in two phases. The first was c. 909 to 969, when the Fatimids were based in Ifriqiya (modern Tunisia); the second lasted until the end of the dynasty in 1171, when they were based in Egypt. During the first period, the navy was employed mainly against the Byzantine Empire in Sicily and southern Italy, where it enjoyed mixed success. It was also in the initially unsuccessful attempts to conquer Egypt from the Abbasids and brief clashes with the Umayyad Caliphate of Córdoba.

During the first decades after the eventual Fatimid conquest of Egypt in 969, the main naval enemy remained the Byzantines, but the war was fought mostly on land over control of Syria, and naval operations were limited to maintaining Fatimid control over the coastal cities of the Levant. Warfare with the Byzantines ended after 1000 with a series of truces, and the navy became once more important with the arrival of the Crusaders in the Holy Land in the late 1090s.

Despite it being well funded and equipped, and one of the few standing navies of its time, a combination of technological and geographical factors prohibited the Fatimid navy from being able to secure supremacy at sea, or interdict the Crusaders' maritime lines of communication to Western Europe. The Fatimids retained a sizeable navy almost up to the end of the regime, but most of the fleet, and its great arsenal, went up in flames in the destruction of Fustat in 1169.

== Background: the Mediterranean in the early 10th century ==
Map of the Arab–Byzantine naval conflict in the Mediterranean, 7th–11th centuries

Since the mid-7th century, the Mediterranean Sea had become a battleground between the Muslim navies and the Byzantine navy. Very soon after their conquest of the Levant and Egypt, the nascent Caliphate built its own fleet, and in the Battle of the Masts in 655 shattered Byzantine naval supremacy, beginning a centuries-long series of conflicts over the control of the Mediterranean waterways. This enabled the Umayyad Caliphate to launch a major seaborne attempt to capture Constantinople in 674–678, followed by another huge land and naval expedition in 717–718, that was equally unsuccessful. At the same time, by the end of the 7th century the Arabs had taken over Byzantine North Africa (known in Arabic as Ifriqiya), and in c. 700, Tunis was founded and quickly became a major Muslim naval base. This not only exposed the Byzantine-ruled islands of Sicily and Sardinia, and the coasts of the Western Mediterranean to recurrent Muslim raids, but allowed the Muslims to invade and conquer most of Visigothic Spain from 711 on.

A period of Byzantine supremacy at sea followed the failed sieges of Constantinople and the virtual disappearance of the Muslim navies, until the re-commencement of Muslim raiding activity towards the end of the 8th century, both by the Abbasid fleets in the East as well as by the new Aghlabid dynasty in Ifriqiya. Then, in the 820s, two events occurred that shattered the existing balance of power and gave the Muslims the upper hand. The first was the capture of Crete by a band of Andalusian exiles (c. 824/827) and the establishment of a piratical emirate there, which withstood repeated Byzantine attempts to reconquer the island. This opened up the Aegean Sea to Muslim raids and put the Byzantines on the defensive. Despite some Byzantine successes such as the Sack of Damietta in 853, the early 10th century saw new heights of Muslim raiding activity, with events like the Sack of Thessalonica in 904, primarily by the fleets of Tarsus, the Syrian coastal towns, and Egypt. The second event was the beginning of the gradual conquest of Sicily by the Aghlabids in 827. The Muslim landing on Sicily was soon followed by the first raids into the Italian mainland and the Adriatic Sea as well. In 902, the Aghlabids completed the conquest of Sicily, but their efforts to establish themselves in mainland Italy ultimately failed. Conversely, while the Byzantines repeatedly failed to stem the Muslim conquest of Sicily, they were able to re-establish their control over southern Italy.

== Historical overview ==
The Fatimid dynasty claimed descent from Fatima, the daughter of Muhammad and wife of Ali, through Isma'il, the son of the last commonly accepted Shi'a Imam, Ja'far al-Sadiq. This claim was often disputed even by their contemporaries, especially the Sunnis. The secretiveness of the family before c. 890 and the differing genealogies subsequently published by the dynasty itself further make it difficult for modern scholars to assess the exact origin of the dynasty. Whatever their true origin, the Fatimids were the leaders of the Isma'ili sect of Shi'ism, and they headed a movement which, in the words of the historian Marius Canard, "was at the same time political and religious, philosophical and social, and whose adherents expected the appearance of a Mahdi descended from the Prophet through Ali and Fatima". As such, they regarded the Sunni Abbasid Caliphate (and the Umayyads of the Caliphate of Córdoba) as usurpers and were determined to overthrow them and take their place at the head of the Islamic world. Their pretensions were not only ecumenical, but also universal: according to their doctrine, the Fatimid imam was no less than the incarnation of the 'world soul'.

The history of the Fatimid navy follows that of the Fatimid Caliphate itself, and can be roughly divided into two distinctive periods: the first in 909–969, when the dynasty assumed control over Ifriqiya (modern Tunisia) and fought in the Maghreb and Sicily, and the second in 969–1171, after its conquest of Egypt, followed by Palestine, much of Syria and the Hejaz. The latter period can again be divided in two sub-periods, with the arrival of the First Crusade in 1099 as the turning point.

== Ifriqiyan period (909–969) ==
=== Political and strategic context ===
The Fatimids came to power in Ifriqiya. Their missionary activity in the area, begun by Abu Abdallah al-Shi'i in 893, bore fruit swiftly, and in 909, they overthrew the reigning Aghlabid dynasty, allowing the Fatimid leader to come out of hiding and declare himself imam and caliph as al-Mahdi Billah (r. 909–934). Already in his inaugural proclamation, al-Mahdi claimed a mandate to "conquer the world to East and West, in accordance with God's promise, from sinful rebels". From the outset, Ifriqiya was thus seen only as a temporary abode, before the march east to overthrow the Abbasids. At the same time, the nascent Fatimid state was surrounded by enemies, necessitating the maintenance of a strong army, and—as the successors to the Aghlabid province of Sicily—a capable fleet as well. During the Ifriqiyan period, the Fatimids faced a major Muslim rival in the form of the powerful Umayyads of Córdoba in al-Andalus (Islamic Spain). However, in the words of the historian Yaacov Lev, "the enmity between the Fatimids and the Spanish Umayyads took the form of propaganda, subversion and war by proxy" rather than direct conflict, which occurred only once in the two states' history.

The Fatimids' ideological imperative also coloured their relations with the main non-Muslim power of the Near East, the Byzantine Empire: as Yaacov Lev writes, "Fatimid policy toward Byzantium oscillated between contradicting tendencies; a practical policy of modus vivendi, and the need to appear as champions of the jihād". Inherent limitations were imposed by the weather and available naval technology, so that the early Fatimid conflicts with Byzantium in the region of southern Italy were shaped by geography: Sicily was close to the Fatimids' metropolitan province of Ifriqiya, while conversely for the Byzantines, southern Italy was a remote theatre of operations, where they maintained a minimal naval presence. This gave the Fatimids an advantage in the waging of prolonged naval campaigns, and effectively left the initiative in their hands.

The naval aspect of the war against the Byzantines features prominently in the poems of the celebrated Fatimid court poet Ibn Hani, who lauded the successful Fatimid challenge to Byzantine thalassocracy in the mid-10th century. Nevertheless, the Fatimids were interested more in raiding than outright conquest, and the fleets involved were small, rarely numbering more than ten to twenty ships. The Byzantines, on the other hand, preferred to deal with the Fatimids through diplomacy. On occasion they allied with the Umayyads of al-Andalus, but mostly they sought to avoid conflict by negotiating truces, even including the occasional dispatch of tribute. This approach allowed the Byzantines to concentrate on affairs much closer to home; thus, when the Emirate of Crete came under Byzantine attack in 960–961, the Fatimids limited themselves to verbal support toward the Cretan emissaries.

=== Organization ===
During the early centuries of Islam, the navies of the caliphates and the autonomous emirates were structured along similar lines. Generally, a fleet (al-usṭūl) was placed under the command of a 'head of the fleet' (rāʾis al-usṭūl) and a number of officers (quwwād, singular qaʿīd'), but the chief professional officer was the 'commander of the sailors' (qaʿīd al-nawātiya), who was in charge of weapons and manoeuvres. Crews comprised sailors (nawātiya, singular nūtī), oarsmen (qadhdhāf), worksmen (dhawu al-ṣināʿa wa'l-mihan), and marines for on-board combat and landing operations, including men charged with deploying incendiary substances (naffāṭūn, 'naphtha men').

During the Ifriqiyan period, the main base and arsenal of the Fatimid navy was the port city of Mahdiya. Founded by al-Mahdi Billah in 916, the city made use of a pre-existing, Punic-built harbor carved out of the rock. Restored by the Fatimids, it offered space for thirty ships and was protected by towers and a chain across its entrance. The nearby arsenal (dār al-ṣināʿa) could reportedly provide shelter for two hundred hulls.

Apart from Mahdiya, Tripoli also appears as an important naval base, while in Sicily, the capital Palermo was the most important base. Later historians like Ibn Khaldun and al-Maqrizi attribute to al-Mahdi and his successors the construction of vast fleets numbering 600 or even 900 ships, but this is obviously an exaggeration and reflects more the impression subsequent generations retained of Fatimid sea-power than actual reality during the 10th century. In fact, the only references in near-contemporary sources about construction of ships at Mahdiya are in regard to the scarcity of wood, which delayed or even stopped construction, and necessitated the import of timber not only from Sicily, but from as far as India.

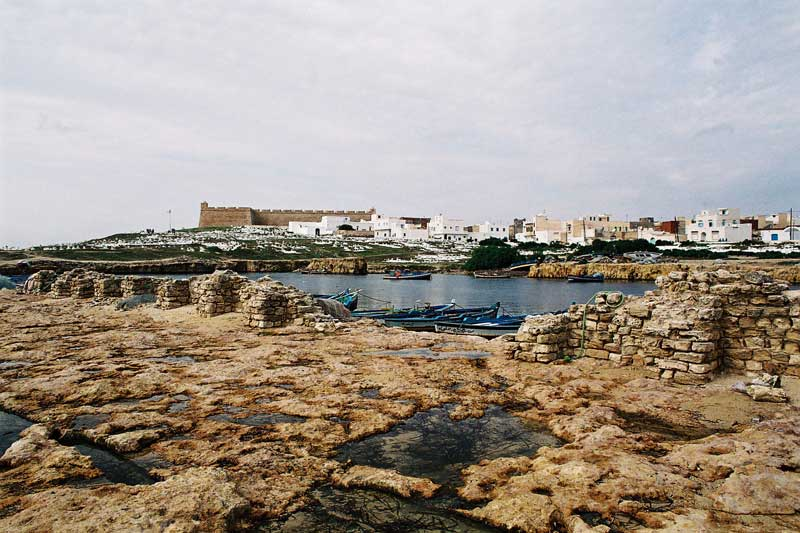
Remains of the Fatimid port of Mahdiya

The governor of Mahdiya—from 948/9 the post was held by the eunuch chamberlain and chief administrator Jawdhar—seems to have also entailed the supervision of the arsenal and naval affairs in general. A certain Husayn ibn Ya'qub is called ṣāḥib al-baḥr ('lord of the sea') and mutawallī al-baḥr ('supervisor of the sea') in the sources, but his exact role is unclear. He was clearly a subordinate of Jawdhar, but despite his title does not appear to have actively commanded the fleet, and his tasks were probably more related with administration or ship construction. Given the focus of Fatimid naval activities against the Byzantines in southern Italy, actual command of the fleet was apparently in the hands of the governor of Sicily.

The structure of the navy in the lower ranks is equally obscure. Based on the breakdown of the prisoners captured off Rosetta in 920, the crews appear to have been recruited in Sicily and the ports of Tripoli and Barqa, while the bulk of the fighting troops was composed of the Kutama Berbers—the main supporters of the Fatimid regime—and the Zuwayla, black Africans (Sudān) recruited into the Fatimid military. As Yaacov Lev comments, this may provide some insight into the generally poor performance of the Fatimid fleets in the early years of the regime: the Kutama were loyal but inexperienced at sea, while the crews, drawn from the maritime populations newly under Fatimid control, were politically unreliable. Furthermore, it appears that the quality of the naval crews suffered as recruitment into the navy was forcible and unpopular. It also tended to affect mostly the lower classes, among whom, as Lev summarizes it, "[t]he navy was despised and naval service was regarded as a calamity".

=== Naval operations ===
==== Early actions ====
The exact origin of the first Fatimid fleet is unknown, but it is likely that the victorious Fatimids merely seized what Aghlabid ships they could find. The first mention of a Fatimid navy occurs in 912/3, when 15 vessels were sent against Tripoli, which had rebelled against Fatimid rule, only to be defeated by the ships of Tripoli's inhabitants. In the next year, 913/4, the governor of Sicily, which also had rejected Fatimid rule, Ahmad ibn Ziyadat Allah ibn Qurhub, raided and burned the Fatimid ships at their anchorage in Lamta, but was soon after defeated in naval battle by the remaining Fatimid fleet, an event which led shortly after to the end of his rule over Sicily and the restoration of Fatimid rule over the island.

==== Attempts to conquer Egypt ====
The first major overseas expedition of the Fatimid navy was during the first attempted invasion of Egypt under Abu'l-Qasim, the future caliph al-Qa'im bi-Amr Allah (r. 934–946) in 914–915. Ibn Khaldun, following the 13th-century writer Ibn al-Abbar, reports that the entire invasion was seaborne, comprising 200 vessels, but according to Yaacov Lev, this "is unsupported by other sources and the number seems highly inflated". On the other hand, it is certain that Abu'l-Qasim did receive seaborne reinforcements during the campaign, landing at Alexandria. The local governor Takin al-Khazari however defeated the Fatimids at Gizah, and the arrival of the Abbasid commander Mu'nis al-Muzaffar in April 915 drove the Fatimids out of the country entirely. The expedition's only gain was Barqah, a useful base for future operations against Egypt.

Although a peace agreement in exchange for annual tribute had been concluded the previous year, in 918, the Fatimids conducted their first attack on the Byzantines, capturing Rhegion on the southern tip of Calabria. The main focus of their activities for some time thereafter, however, remained in the east and their attempts to supplant the Abbasids. In 919–921, Abu'l-Qasim led another invasion of Egypt, aided by a fleet of 60 to 100 vessels. Once more the Fatimids seized Alexandria and the Fayyum Oasis as well, but were prevented from capturing Fustat by Mu'nis. Their fleet was prevented from entering the Rosetta branch of the Nile by the fleet of Tarsus under Thamal al-Dulafi, and on 12 March, near Abukir, Thamal inflicted a crushing defeat on the Fatimid fleet. Most of the Fatimid crews were either killed or captured. In spring 921, Thamal and his fleet retook to Alexandria, captured by the Fatimids in 919. Mu'nis then advanced on the Fayyum, forcing the Fatimids to retreat over the desert.

==== Expeditions in southern Italy and the revolt of Abu Yazid ====
Map of southern Italy in the 10th century. Byzantine provinces (themes) in yellow, Lombard principalities in other colours.

Thwarted in Egypt, the Fatimids remained active in the Western Mediterranean. In 922/3, an expedition of 20 ships under Mas'ud al-Fati took the fortress of St. Agatha near Rhegion, while in spring 925 a large army under Ja'far ibn Ubayd, which had been ferried over to Sicily the previous year, raided Bruzzano near Reggio, before sailing on to sack Oria in Apulia. Over 11,000 prisoners were made, and the local Byzantine commander and bishop surrendered as hostages in exchange for the payment of tribute. In September, the chamberlain returned in triumph to Mahdiya on 3 September 915. In 924, the Fatimids also entered into contact with envoys of the Bulgarian Tsar Simeon. Simeon, who was considering attacking Constantinople itself, sought Fatimid naval assistance. Informed of the negotiations after capturing a ship carrying the returning Bulgarian and Arab envoys to Simeon, the Byzantines hastened to renew the 917 peace agreement, including the payment of tribute.

Warfare with the Byzantines resumed in 928. In May of that year, the governor of Kairouan, Sabir al-Fata, led a fleet of 44 ships sent from Ifriqiya to Sicily. The Fatimids attacked a locality named al-Ghiran ('the caves') in Apulia, and proceeded to sack the cities of Taranto and Otranto. The outbreak of a disease forced them to return to Sicily, but then Sabir led his fleet up the Tyrrhenian Sea, forcing Salerno and Naples to ransom themselves with money and precious brocades. In 929, with four ships, he defeated the local Byzantine stratēgos in the Adriatic, although the latter had seven ships under his command, and sacked Termoli. He returned to Mahdiya on 5 September 930, laden with 18,000 prisoners. Although the Fatimids planned a new and larger naval offensive against the Byzantines in Italy, another truce was concluded in 931/2, which was adhered to for several years, despite the Byzantines' intervention on the side of an anti-Fatimid uprising in Sicily in 936/7. In 934–935, Ya'qub ibn Ishaq al-Tamimi led another raid, reportedly of 30 vessels, into Italian waters. Genoa was sacked, while Sardinia and Corsica were raided.

In 943–947, Fatimid rule was threatened by the revolt of Abu Yazid, which at times came close to overthrowing the dynasty. The absence of a rebel fleet meant that the Fatimid navy played a limited, but crucial, role in ferrying supplies into Mahdiya when it was besieged by the rebels. Taking advantage of the turmoil, pirates took over the town of Susa, and allied themselves with the rebels. The first Fatimid attempt to retake it in 945/6 involved troops borne by a squadron of seven ships, but failed; a second attempt shortly after, with a fleet of six ships under the command of Ya'qub al-Tamimi and co-ordinated with a landward assault, was successful in retaking the town.

In the meantime, another uprising against Fatimid rule erupted in Sicily, as the local governor was judged to be too weak towards the Byzantines, allowing the latter to stop paying the agreed-upon tribute in exchange for the truce. Following the end of Abu Yazid's revolt, the Fatimid governor al-Hasan al-Kalbi suppressed it in spring 947. In 949, the Byzantines and Umayyads formed a league against the Fatimids, and launched a two-pronged attack on them: while the Byzantines gathered forces to move against Sicily, the Umayyads captured Tangiers in 951. Considerable land and naval forces were assembled in Sicily in 950, and in May 951, the Fatimids landed in Calabria and attacked a few Byzantine fortresses without success, leaving after a payment of tribute, once the Byzantine army approached the town. Although the Fatimids captured the local Byzantine naval commander and his flagship, the expedition returned to Sicily to winter, much to the fury of caliph al-Mansur bi-Nasr Allah (r. 946–953). In the next year, after a Fatimid victory at Gerace, the Byzantines sent another embassy, and hostilities ceased once more.

==== Conflict with the Umayyads and final conquest of Sicily ====
In 955, relations between the Fatimids and the Umayyads, long tense and hostile, boiled over when a Fatimid courier boat sailing from Sicily to Mahdiya was intercepted by an Andalusian merchant ship. Fearing that it would alert Fatimid privateers, the Andalusians not only removed its rudder, but took along the case containing the dispatches it carried. In retaliation, the new Fatimid caliph al-Mu'izz li-Din Allah (r. 953–975) ordered al-Hasan al-Kalbi to pursue, but he was unable to catch the ship before it reached the port of Almería. Without hesitating, al-Hasan took his squadron into the harbour, plundered it, burned the arsenal and the Umayyad ships anchored there, and returned to Ifriqiya. The Umayyads responded by sending admiral Ghalib al-Siqlabi with a fleet of 70 vessels to Ifriqiya. The Umayyad fleet raided the port of al-Kharaz and the environs of Susa and Tabarqa.

Fatimid sources report that the Umayyads proposed joint action with Byzantium, but although an expeditionary force under Marianos Argyros was sent to Italy, it occupied itself with suppressing local revolts rather than engaging the Fatimids, and the Byzantine envoys offered to renew and extend the existing truce. Al-Mu'izz however, determined to expose the Umayyads' collaboration with the infidel enemy and emulate the achievements of his father, refused. The Caliph dispatched more forces to Sicily under al-Hasan al-Kalbi and his brother, Ammar ibn Ali al-Kalbi. The Fatimid official Qadi al-Nu'man reports that initially, the Byzantine fleet was heavily defeated in the Straits of Messina, and that the Fatimids plundered Calabria, whereupon Marianos Argyros visited the caliphal court and arranged for a renewal of the truce. In 957 however the Byzantines under their admiral Basil raided Termini near Palermo, and al-Hasan suffered heavy losses in a storm off Mazara, which dispersed his fleet and killed many of the crews. The survivors were then attacked by the Byzantines, who destroyed 12 ships. Another effort by Argyros to renew the truce in autumn 957 failed, but after the Fatimid fleet was again wrecked in a storm, in which Ammar perished, al-Mu'izz accepted the Byzantine proposals for a renewed five-year truce in 958.

The truce with the Byzantine Empire held despite the massive seaborne expedition launched by Byzantium in 960 to recover the island of Crete. The Cretan Arabs appealed for help to both the Fatimids and to the Ikhshidids of Egypt. Al-Mu'izz wrote to the Byzantine emperor, Romanos II, threatening to retaliate if the expedition was not recalled, and urged the ruler of Egypt, Abu al-Misk Kafur, to combine their navies at Barqa in May 961 and initiate joint action. If Kafur refused, the Fatimids claimed they would sail alone. Kafur, suspicious of Fatimid intentions, refused to co-operate with the Fatimid designs, and indeed it is very likely that al-Mu'izz's proposal was from the beginning a calculated gesture mostly intended for public consumption in the propaganda war with the Sunni Abbasids, with al-Mu'izz trying to present himself as the champion of the jihād against the infidels. In the event the Cretans received no aid from the rest of the Muslim world, and their capital, Chandax, fell after a ten-month siege in March 961.

While the Byzantines were concentrating their energies in the east, by 958, the Fatimid general Jawhar al-Siqilli had completed his conquest of North Africa in the name of al-Mu'izz, reaching the shores of the Atlantic Ocean. The Fatimids' rivals, the Idrisids, were humbled, and the Umayyads were reduced to a single outpost, Ceuta. This success allowed the Fatimids to turn their undivided attention to Sicily, where they decided to reduce the remaining Byzantine strongholds. The Fatimid offensive began with Taormina, which was recaptured in 962, after a long siege. In response, the Byzantines sent another expeditionary force with the object of recovering Sicily in 964. The Byzantine attempt to relieve Rometta was heavily defeated, however, and the Fatimid governor Ahmad ibn al-Hasan al-Kalbi destroyed the invasion fleet at the Battle of the Straits early in 965, using divers equipped with incendiary devices filled with Greek fire. Rometta surrendered soon after, bringing the Muslim conquest of Sicily to a successful conclusion, after almost one and a half centuries of warfare. This led the Byzantines to once more request a truce in 966/7. The armistice was granted, as the Fatimids were in the midst of their greatest project: the final conquest of Egypt. Already in 965/6, al-Mu'izz began storing provisions and making preparations for a new invasion of Egypt. In 968/9, Ahmad al-Kalbi was recalled with his family and property, in order to lead the naval component of the Egyptian expedition. Ahmad arrived with 30 ships at Tripoli, but soon fell ill and died.

== Egyptian period (969–1171) ==
=== Background: the navy of early Muslim Egypt ===
Egypt had been the base of a significant navy already in the early Muslim period, mostly manned by native Christian Egyptians (Copts), as the Arabs themselves had little taste for the sea. An Egyptian fleet is attested as late as 736 in an (unsuccessful) attack on Byzantine territory, but after the resurgence of the Byzantine fleet following the disastrous Second Arab Siege of Constantinople, the crushing defeat of the Egyptian fleet at the Battle of Keramaia in 746, and the turmoil of the Abbasid Revolution, a period of neglect began. A concerted effort to re-establish a credible naval force began only following the sack of Damietta in 853 by a Byzantine fleet, which jolted the Abbasid authorities into action. The 15th-century historian al-Maqrizi claims that the Egyptian fleet experienced a renaissance that made it into an effective fighting force, but modern scholarly judgments of the service record of the Egyptian navy under the Tulunids (868–905) are more cautious, and it is commonly held that Egypt boasted again of a powerful naval establishment only after the Fatimids took over the country.

=== Political and strategic context ===
==== Until the mid-11th century: Byzantium and regional struggles ====
During the early Egyptian period of the Fatimid Caliphate, the main external enemy, as in the Ifriqiyan period, remained the Byzantine Empire. The Fatimid conquest of Egypt coincided with the Byzantine expansion in northern Syria: Tarsus and Cyprus were captured by the Byzantines in 965, and Antioch was conquered in 969. Along with the fall of the Cretan emirate, these events signalled the complete shift of the maritime balance in favour of the Byzantines, who were now constantly expanding at the expense of the Muslims. The Byzantine successes reverberated across the Muslim world: while volunteers from as far as Khurasan arrived to fight in the jihād, the population clamoured for action by their rulers, whom they perceived as too passive.

Basing their legitimization on their championing of the fight against the infidels, the Fatimids exploited this fervour for their own purposes, but their first attempt to evict the Byzantines from Antioch was defeated in 971. This was followed by a series of Qarmatian invasions under al-Hasan al-A'sam, which ousted the Fatimids from southern Syria and Palestine and even threatened their control of Egypt; it was not until 978 that the Qarmatians were defeated and Fatimid authority firmly established over the southern Levant. The rivalry with the Byzantines continued, with unsuccessful attempts by the Byzantine emperor John I Tzimiskes (r. 969–976) to capture the ports of Tripoli and Beirut, and a protracted round of warfare in 992–998 over control of the Hamdanid emirate of Aleppo. This was followed by the conclusion of a ten-year truce in 999/1000 that, despite the continuing rivalry over Aleppo and occasional rifts, was repeatedly renewed and ushered a period of peaceful and even friendly relations that lasted for decades, only interrupted by brief war over Laodicea sometime between 1055 and 1058.

In the context of these campaigns against Byzantium, the naval element played a relatively limited role, with occasional expeditions followed by long intervals of inactivity. This was the result of both the resurgence in Byzantine military might during the middle of the 10th century, as well as the new geographic circumstances in which the Fatimid navy operated: unlike Ifriqiya and Sicily, Egypt was separated from the nearest Byzantine shores by long stretches of open sea. The main naval preoccupation of the Fatimids was securing control of the coastal towns of Palestine and Syria—Ascalon, Jaffa, Acre, Sidon, Tyre, Beirut, and Tripoli—on which Fatimid rule in the region largely depended, given the insecurity of the overland routes due to the constant revolts and depredations of the Bedouin tribes. While the towns of the northern Syrian coast were in Byzantine hands, the Fatimids were generally successful in preserving their control over the remainder, both against Byzantine attacks as well as against attempts by local Syrian warlords to break away from Fatimid control.

After peaceful relations with the Byzantines were established at the turn of the 11th century, the Fatimid navy appears to have atrophied, its place perhaps being taken by the pirates of Barqa, with whom the Fatimids maintained good relations until c. 1051/2. In 1046, the Persian traveller Nasir Khosrau reported in his Safarnama to have seen the remains of seven huge ships belonging to al-Mu'izz's navy at Cairo.

==== Late 11th century to the end of the Fatimid state: the era of the Crusades ====
From the second third of the 11th century, the Fatimid dynasty and state began to decline. During the long reign of al-Mustansir Billah (r. 1036–1094), political instability combined with military uprisings to almost unseat the dynasty; only the establishment of a quasi-dictatorial regime under the vizier Badr al-Jamali saved the Fatimid regime, at the cost of the caliph handing over his powers to his viziers.

By the 1070s, the internal problems and the arrival of the Seljuks in the Levant led to a collapse of Fatimid power in Syria. Only the coastal towns of Ascalon, Acre, Sidon, Tyre, and Beirut remained in Fatimid hands. It was precisely from these holdings that Badr tried to defend, and which formed the power base that allowed him to seize power in Cairo. As Badr's attempts to recover inland Syria failed, the Fatimids now found themselves separated from their old opponent, the Byzantine Empire, by the domains of the Seljuks. This altered strategic situation would once again be upended entirely with the arrival of the First Crusade in 1098.

At that time, the Fatimids remained able to field a sizeable, well-funded, and well-organized navy. As the naval historian John H. Pryor points out, at an age where even the Italian maritime republics assembled their fleets on an ad hoc basis, Fatimid Egypt was one of only three states in the Mediterranean or the rest of Europe—along with Byzantium and the Norman Kingdom of Sicily—to maintain a standing navy.

While the Crusader states of the Levant themselves lacked a navy and were dependent on the naval assistance of the Byzantines or the Italian maritime republics, with whom relations were often strained, several factors combined to limit the Fatimid navy's effectiveness against the Crusaders. Thus the Fatimids were confronted not by one, but several Christian naval powers, from Byzantium to the Italian maritime republics and the kingdoms of Western Europe. By itself, Egypt lacked the material means and manpower to support a standing navy large enough to overcome them, forcing the Fatimids to operate from a position of numerical inferiority. Historian William Hamblin points out that even if the Fatimids defeated one fleet in one year, they could "find themselves facing an equally powerful Venetian, Norse, or Byzantine fleet the next year", while "a naval defeat for the Fatimids represented a major loss which might take several years and great expenditure to replace". Yaacov Lev also stresses that both Byzantine and Muslim naval tactics of the period urged caution, and that, as modern scholarship recognizes, "galley fleets could not achieve naval supremacy and control of the sea in the modern sense". The operational radius of the Egypt-based Fatimid fleets was also limited by the supplies they could carry on board—especially water (see below)—and the navigation patterns in the Mediterranean, which meant that they were never able to strike back at the Christian naval powers in their home waters or successfully interdict the shipping lanes leading to the Levant.

Furthermore, Fatimid naval strategy during the Crusades relied on the control of the coastal cities of the Levant, but these were vulnerable to assault from their hinterland, which the Crusaders controlled. Not only were the limited resources the Fatimids had at hand in Palestine necessarily split up among these cities, thus diminishing their effectiveness, but the bulk of the Fatimid navy, which was based in Egypt, was hard-pressed to respond effectively and on time to any threat. According to Hamblin, it took on the average two months from the onset of a siege against one of the coastal cities until the Fatimids were informed, mobilized their navy and army, and the latter arrived at Ascalon ready for action. By that point, Hamblin points out, "most sieges were either successfully completed or abandoned". Each loss of a city thus strengthened the Crusaders while weakening the Fatimids. A further drawback was that the prevailing winds in the region were to the south, and could cause significant delays for any Egyptian fleet sent to Palestine.

The Fatimid navy remained in existence until it was destroyed at its arsenal in November 1168, when the vizier Shawar set fire to Fustat to prevent its fall to the Crusaders under Amalric of Jerusalem. Although a few ships may have survived, Egypt appears to have remained effectively without a fleet thereafter, as Saladin was forced to re-establish it from scratch in c. 1176/7.

=== Organization ===
Already before the Fatimid takeover, the main arsenal and naval base in Egypt was at the inland capital of Fustat, specifically at the island of Jazira, located between Fustat and Giza. Medieval geographers report the presence of many ships at Fustat, but the city had no real port; instead, the 6 kilometres (3.7 mi) long shore of the Nile was used as an anchorage. After the foundation of Cairo, a new arsenal was built at the port of al-Maqs, west of Cairo, by al-Aziz, but the old arsenal of Jazira continued in use, especially for ceremonial purposes, until the main arsenal was moved to Fustat from c. 1120 on. The location of the main fleet base inland shielded it from seaborne raids, while the canal network of the Nile Delta allowed the fleet easy access to the Mediterranean and the important ports of Alexandria and Damietta, which are also mentioned as the sites of arsenals. Likewise, on the Palestinian and Syrian coasts the local port cities were important maritime centres, but information on the extent of Fatimid naval presence or the operation of arsenals there is virtually non-existent. According to the early 15th-century writer Ahmad al-Qalqashandi, the Fatimids also maintained three to five ships in the Red Sea to protect commerce and the pilgrim traffic, with Suez and Aydhab as their bases. This does not appear to be corroborated from contemporary sources, however, and as Yaacov Lev points out, "considering the length of the Red Sea and the limited range of the galleys, the presence of such a small squadron had little practical meaning." It appears that the Fatimids did not maintain a permanent naval establishment in the Red Sea, but rather employed warships there on an ad hoc basis.

Al-Qalqashandi also records that the Fatimid fleet at the time of the Crusades consisted of 75 galleys and 10 large transports, while various modern estimates have placed the Fatimid navy's strength at 75–100 galleys and 20 transports of the hammalat and musattahat types. As William Hamblin points out, however, these numbers represent a theoretical establishment size, whereas in reality, the Fatimid fleet probably never reached this size due to losses in battle and storms, or the lack of crews and maintenance. On the other hand, the Fatimids had easy access to a large number of merchant vessels that could be commandeered as transports. Thus although Fatimid fleets of over 70 ships are attested in the sources during the 12th century, only a third of them were warships, with the rest transports. Hamblin estimates that of the nominal strength of 75 warships, 15 to 25 were probably stationed at the Palestinian port cities, with 45 to 55 warships left in Egypt, although of course the exact distribution could change depending on the circumstances. On the other hand, during the conflicts with the Byzantines in the late 10th century, the sources do not report any permanent presence of Fatimid ships in the Levantine ports, suggesting that it operated solely from Egypt.

Although not many details are known, the Fatimid-era Egyptian navy seems to have been well organized. The overall responsibility for the navy lay with the ʾamīr al-baḥr ('commander of the sea'), a rather elevated office in the hierarchy, with the administration entrusted to a special department (dīwān), characteristically named the dīwān al-jihād. The navy was funded by revenue from special estates set aside for the purpose. The total manpower reached some 5,000 men, divided into a system of naval ranks analogous to that of the army, with pay scales of two, five, ten, fifteen, and twenty gold dinars a month. In addition, the Fatimid fleet had a standing force of marine infantry for shipborne combat. The fleet seems to have been well trained, at least if the reports of elaborate fleet reviews in which manoeuvres and wargames were displayed for the Caliph are an indication. There is also evidence of the study of naval tactics on a theoretical basis, and portions of naval manuals, analogous to their better-known Byzantine counterparts, have survived. On the other hand, if the numbers reported by al-Qalqashandi come close to reality, and given the manpower needs of a galley, 5,000 men were insufficient to crew the larger fleets reported in the sources. This means that in times of mobilization, wide-scale impressment of civilian sailors took place—as is indeed indicated by some sources—which probably diminished the cohesion and effectiveness of the navy somewhat. In addition, Fatimid naval strength was hampered by the limitations of Egypt itself: a small coast with a relatively small seafaring population, and the lack of adequate lumber for shipbuilding due to the country's progressive deforestation, which was essentially complete by the 13th century. This placed a greater reliance on the woods of the Levant, especially Mount Lebanon, but access to these was lost with the onset of the Crusades.

=== Naval operations ===
==== Conquest of Egypt and first forays into the Levant ====
The Fatimid conquest of Egypt was swift: by June 969, the Fatimid army under Jawhar al-Siqilli stood before Fustat, and after the Ikhshidid troops failed in a last-ditch effort to stop the Fatimids, the city, and Egypt with it, surrendered. There is no mention of the navy's activity, or even presence, during the conquest. In the spring of 970, the Fatimids under Ja'far ibn Fallah invaded Palestine as well, and defeated the Ikhshidid remnants under al-Hasan ibn Ubayd Allah ibn Tughj.

The first mention of Fatimid naval activity in the Eastern Mediterranean after the takeover of Egypt comes in the second half of 971, when a squadron of 15 ships tried to rescue a Fatimid force besieged in Jaffa. The attempt failed, as thirteen of the ships were sunk by what the sources record as a Qarmatian navy, and the rest were captured by the Byzantines. Shortly after, in June/July 972, thirty Fatimid ships arrived from Ifriqiya and raided up the Syrian coast. At about the same time, the Fatimid fleet escorted al-Mu'izz to Egypt. In mid-September 973, while the Fatimid fleet was being inspected by al-Mu'izz at Cairo, a Qarmatian fleet attacked Tinnis, but lost seven ships and 500 men; the prisoners and the heads of those killed were paraded in Cairo.

==== Conflict with the Byzantines in the Levant ====
Information about the activities of the Fatimid navy for the next few decades is sparse, but by and large the navy appears to have been inactive, except for brief campaigns during periods of conflict with the Byzantines in Syria. This was the case during the 992–995 clashes over mastery over the Hamdanid emirate of Aleppo. Thus, aside from ferrying supplies to the troops of the Fatimid commander Manjutakin, the Fatimid fleet was mobilized to oppose a Byzantine fleet that appeared before Alexandria in May/June 993, leading to a battle in which the Fatimids captured 70 prisoners, while in the next year, the Fatimids launched a naval raid that returned in June/July with 100 prisoners.

Following the defeat of Manjutakin before Aleppo in 995, Caliph al-Aziz Billah (r. 975–996) launched a large-scale rearmament, which included the construction of a new fleet. Sixteen new ships were built in the arsenal, to be added to the eighteen ordered two years before. But just as the town criers were calling on the crews to embark, on 15 May 996, a fire broke out that destroyed the fleet and the gathered naval stores except for six empty hulls. A sabotage was suspected: Byzantine prisoners of war were employed in the arsenal, and traders from Amalfi had a colony in the city. An anti-Christian pogrom against the city's Christian communities resulted, leaving 170 dead. Under the direction of the vizier Isa ibn Nestorius, work began anew, with wood stripped from the capital's buildings; even the huge doors of the mint were removed. Despite plans for the construction of twenty vessels, however, only six seem to have been completed, two of which were reportedly extremely large ones.

A naval raid shortly after, in summer 996, returned with 220 prisoners, but a fleet of 24 ships sent to the aid of Manjutakin's troops, who were besieging Antartus, was lost when it was wrecked on offshore cliffs in bad weather. The Byzantine doux of Antioch and the city's garrison were able to recover them with little effort. Despite this disaster, in 997/8 the Fatimid fleet was able to assist in the quelling of the rebellion of Tyre, and thwart the Byzantine attempts to lend aid to the besieged rebels there. after the conclusion of a peace agreement in 1001, a long period of peaceful relations began, until the Destruction of the Church of the Holy Sepulchre in 1015/6. A period of intermittent warfare followed until 1038, when another peace agreement was signed. During this period, the only reference to Fatimid naval activity is in 1024, when the navy ferried reinforcements to the Syrian coastal cities. In 1056, during another brief conflict, Empress Theodora sent a fleet of 80 ships to menace the Syrian coast, but her death soon after led to a resumption of peaceful relations.

==== Defence of the coastal cities of the Levant against the Crusaders ====
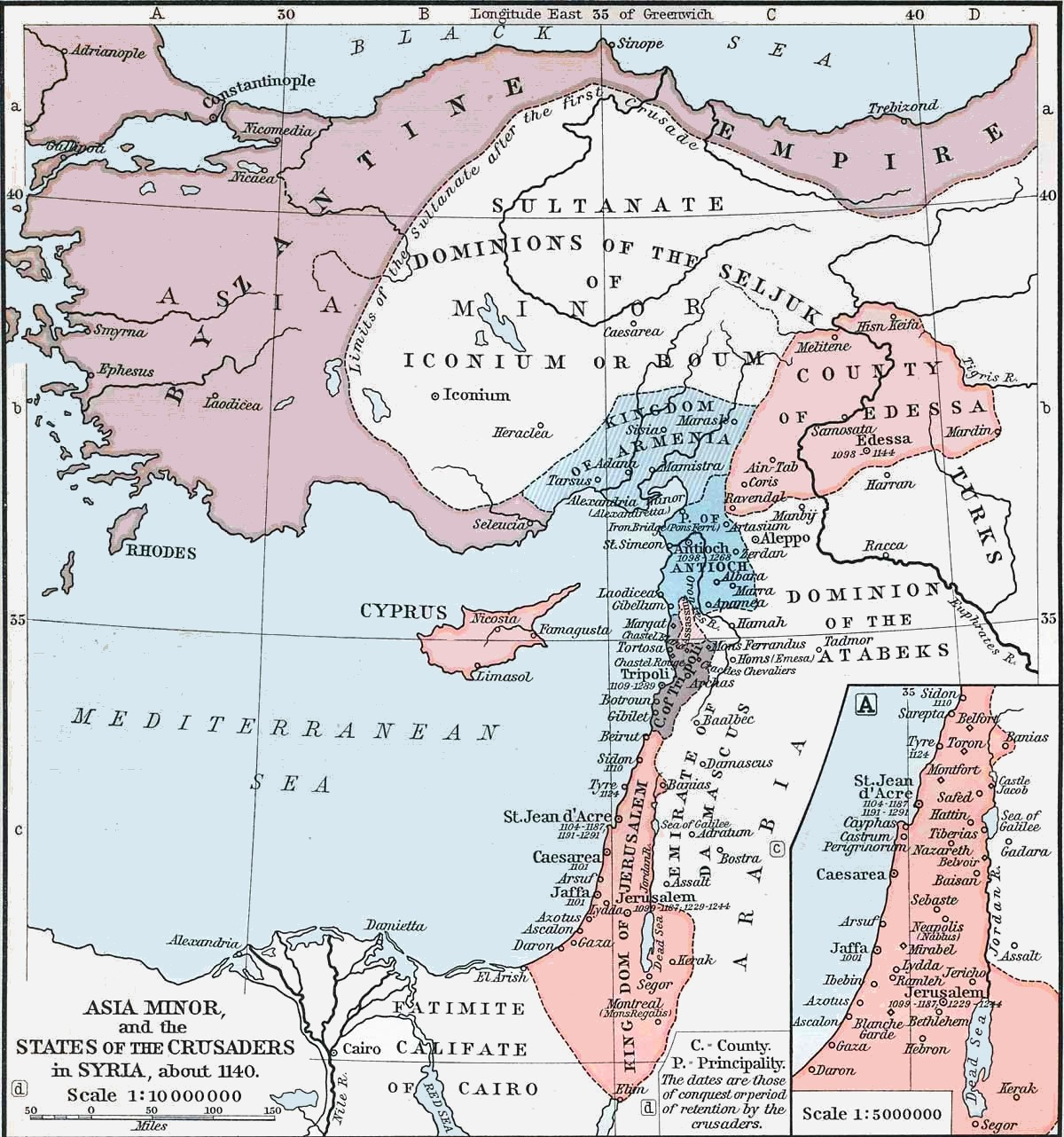
Political map of the Levant in c. 1140

During the Siege of Jerusalem by the First Crusade, the Fatimid fleet was active in support of the land army, blockading the small Genoese squadron at Jaffa. It then supported the land army at the Battle of Ascalon.

Despite his defeat at Ascalon, the Fatimid vizier, al-Afdal, remained an active opponent of the Crusaders. Every year until 1105 he launched his forces in campaigns into Palestine, and instituted reforms to strengthen Egypt's military might. The actual effect of these reforms, however, appears to have been negligible. Thus in September 1101, the Fatimid fleet participated in the siege of Jaffa. In the next year, the Crusaders received substantial reinforcements by sea, with the sources putting them from 40 up to 200 vessels; many were lost, however, to storms and to the activity of Fatimid privateers.

In 1102, al-Afdal sent a combined land and naval expedition under his son, Sharaf al-Ma'ali, to invade Palestine. The Fatimids scored a major victory at the Battle of Ramla over King Baldwin I of Jerusalem, but their indecisiveness as to their next actions robbed them of a unique opportunity to make major territorial gains. Sharaf al-Ma'ali repulsed an attack of the Crusader fleet on Ascalon, but returned to Egypt without achieving anything else. In spring 1103, twelve ships from Tyre and Sidon managed to break through the Crusader siege of Acre, while in the summer a fleet from Egypt blockaded Jaffa. Once again, however, the co-operation between fleet and army broke down; after waiting for twenty days off Jaffa, and repeated requests to Ascalon for assistance went unanswered, the Fatimid admiral Ibn Qadus retreated.

In the next year, however, when a large Genoese fleet arrived to reinforce the siege of Acre, the Fatimids made no further attempt to break the blockade, leading to the city's capitulation. The Fatimids again launched an attack on Jaffa in 1105, but the fleet left for Tyre and Sidon after the land army was defeated, and was caught up in a storm that washed 25 ships ashore and sunk others. In 1106 and again in 1108, the Crusaders launched attacks on Sidon. In the latter attempt, the Fatimid fleet managed to defeat the Italian warships supporting the Crusaders. Coupled with the arrival of Damascene troops, the Fatimid victory led to the failure of the siege.

When the Crusaders launched their final attack on Tripoli in 1109, however, the Fatimid fleet was delayed both due to timidity—possibly due to the presence of a strong Genoese fleet—and contrary winds, so that it arrived only eight days after the city had fallen. The supplies were offloaded among the other coastal cities still in Fatimid hands, and the fleet returned to Egypt in the same summer. In 1110, the Crusaders attacked Beirut. 19 Fatimid ships manage to break through to Beirut, defeating and capturing some of the Christian vessels blockading it, but the arrival of a Genoese fleet bottled them up inside the harbour, forcing their crews to fight alongside the inhabitants on the ramparts until the city fell. In the same autumn, the Crusaders besieged Sidon with the aid of a newly arrived Norwegian fleet of 55–60 ships. The presence of this strong fleet, the losses suffered at Beirut, as well as the lateness of the season and the risks of sailing in winter, forced the Fatimid navy, although anchored at nearby Tyre, not try to assist the beleaguered city, which fell on 4 December. Not only that, but due to the inability of the Fatimids to provide a naval escort, many Muslim merchant ships were captured by Christian warships off the Egyptian coast at Tanis and Damietta in the same summer.

The Fatimid fleet was once again active in 1112, when it brought provisions and grain to Tyre for the garrison and the populace, which, although a Fatimid possession, was actually held by the Turkish ruler of Damascus. Arriving in mid-July, the fleet returned to Egypt in September. In 1115, while King Baldwin I of Jerusalem was campaigning in northern Syria, the Fatimids again launched a failed attempt to capture Jaffa, mobilizing some 70 vessels. The navy was mobilized in 1118 in support of the land army, but the latter remained inactive. Although the fleet sailed to Tyre and Ascalon, no naval engagements are known. In 1122, the Fatimids recovered control of Tyre, where the Turkish governor's tyrannical rule had aroused the opposition of the populace: a Fatimid fleet arrived in the city and took the governor prisoner to Egypt, while replenishing the city's grain supplies. While a successful action, it also meant the rupture of relations with Damascus.

In early 1123, the Fatimids launched another attack on Jaffa, an operation which according to Yaacov Lev provides a textbook example of the ineffectiveness of the Fatimid military in this period. A sizeable army was raised and splendidly equipped, and was accompanied by a fleet of 80 vessels, which carried siege equipment and troops. At the same time, another squadron was conducting raids against Christian Shipping. Jaffa was besieged for five days, but then the Crusader army arrived and the siege had to be abandoned. The Fatimid land army was then defeated at the Battle of Yibneh leaving the Fatimid fleet to sail off towards Ascalon. At about the same time, in late May, a large Venetian fleet of 200 vessels arrived in the Holy Land, and proceeded to pursue the Fatimid fleet. Caught off guard near shallow water on 30 May 1123, the Fatimids suffered heavy losses, with many ships being captured. The Muslim chroniclers do not report on this battle, instead focusing on the repulsion of a Byzantine–Venetian attack on Alexandria, and the return of a fleet from a raid with three captured vessels. The Venetians followed up their victory by helping the Crusaders to besiege Tyre, which fell after five months in July 1124. The Fatimids failed to send any help whatsoever to the town. In 1125, a large fleet of 22–24 warships and 53 other vessels was sent forth to raid the shores of the Levant and Cyprus. Not only did it fail to engage any significant targets, it also lost part of its crews when they landed to find water.

==== Swan song of the Fatimid navy: the 1150s and 1160s ====
After these debacles, the Fatimids abstained from any action against the Crusader Kingdom of Jerusalem, and nothing is heard of the Fatimid navy, until 1151/2. In that year, as a retaliation for the Crusader sack of Farama, the vizier Ibn al-Sallar equipped a fleet—reportedly to the cost of 300,000 dinars—to raid Christian shipping from Jaffa to Tripoli. The raid was evidently successful, with several Byzantine and Crusader ships captured. In 1153, the Crusaders laid siege to Ascalon. The Fatimid navy was mobilized to ferry supplies and reinforcements into the besieged city, but this was unable to prevent its fall on 22 August. Despite the loss of this important base, the Fatimid navy remained active off the Levant coast in the following years: the harbour of Tyre was successfully raided in 1155/6, and in the next year, the Egyptian fleet appeared before Acre and Beirut. Further raiding expeditions were staged in 1157, when the fleet returned to Egypt with 700 prisoners; and in 1158, when a squadron of five galleys raided Christian shipping, and the Alexandria squadron likewise engaged in raids.

When the Crusaders under King Amalric of Jerusalem captured Bilbays, a fleet of 20 galleys and 10 harraqat (ships equipped with Greek fire) is mentioned as operating on the Nile. When the vizier Shawar, faced with Amalric's advance, set fire to Fustat in November 1168, the arsenal and most of the surviving fleet were destroyed as well, although some ships and naval installations may have survived at Alexandria and Damietta, to form the basis of the rebirth (Note: Saladin's reign would mark a brief rebirth of the Egyptian navy: he rebuilt the arsenals, increased salaries for sailors, and established a separate navy bureau, so that his fleet numbered 60 galleys and 20 transports by 1179. This navy had mixed success against the Crusaders, until it was virtually destroyed during its attempts to break the Christian naval blockade during the Siege of Acre (1189–1191). After that the navy was neglected by successive regimes, so that, according to the 15th-century historian al-Maqrizi, the term 'sailor' was used as an insult in Egypt.) of the Egyptian fleet under Saladin.

== Naval strategy, logistics and tactics ==
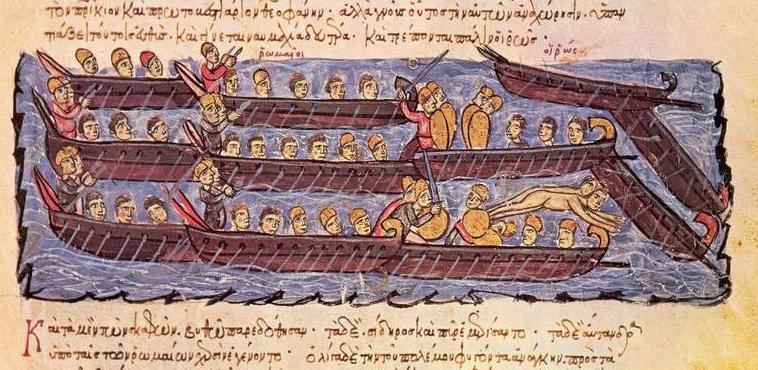
Depiction of a 10th-century sea battle from the Madrid Skylitzes

Ancient and medieval naval operations faced severe constraints, compared to modern navies, as the result of the technological limitations inherent in galley-based fleets. Galleys did not handle well in rough waters and could be swamped by waves, which would be catastrophic in the open sea; history is replete with instances where galley fleets were sunk by bad weather (e.g. the Roman losses during the First Punic War). The sailing season was therefore usually restricted from mid-spring to September. The maintainable cruising speed of a galley, even when using sails, was limited, as were the amount of supplies it could carry. Water in particular, being essentially a galley's 'fuel' supply, was of critical importance. With consumption levels estimated at 8 litres a day for every oarsman, its availability was a decisive operational factor in the often water-scarce and sun-baked coasts of the Eastern Mediterranean. Smaller galleys are estimated to have been able to carry about 4 days' worth of water. Effectively, this meant that fleets composed of galleys were confined to coastal routes, and had to make frequent landfall to replenish their supplies and rest their crews. The Fatimids faced a particular disadvantage in this area, as due to shortage of timber they appear to have used amphorae rather than barrels to hold water, which put them at a disadvantage: due to their shape, the amphorae occupied more space as they were more fragile and had to be stored upright and padded with dunnage; and they were also far more difficult to handle and refill. As John H. Pryor has demonstrated, it is for these reasons that Egypt-based fleets were unable to effectively intercept Crusader shipping between Cyprus and Palestine.

Medieval Mediterranean naval warfare was therefore essentially coastal and amphibious in nature, carried out to seize coastal territory or islands, and not to exercise "sea control" as it is understood today. Furthermore, following the abandonment of the ram, the only truly "ship-killing" weapon available prior to the advent of gunpowder and explosive shells, sea combat became, in the words of John H. Pryor, "more unpredictable. No longer could any power hope to have such an advantage in weaponry or the skill of crews that success could be expected." It is no surprise therefore that the Byzantine and Arab manuals emphasize cautious tactics, with the priority given to the preservation of one's own fleet, and the acquisition of accurate intelligence, often through the use of spies posing as merchants. Emphasis was placed on achieving tactical surprise and, conversely, on avoiding being caught unprepared by the enemy. Ideally, battle was to be given only when assured of superiority by virtue of numbers or tactical disposition. The maintenance of a well-ordered formation was stressed. Once the fleets were close enough, exchanges of missiles began, ranging from combustible projectiles to arrows and javelins. The aim was not to sink ships, but to deplete the ranks of the enemy crews before the boarding actions, which decided the outcome.

== Ships and armament ==
The construction of early Muslim ships is still shrouded in mystery, as no pictorial representation prior to the 14th century survives. As the first Muslims relied on the shipbuilding skills and techniques of the maritime peoples they conquered, however, it is generally assumed that their ships were similar to their Byzantine counterparts. Thus the Byzantine dromōn was evidently the origin of the Arabic adrumūnun, and the chelandion the counterpart to the Arabic shalandī. The only difference seems to be that the Muslim warships were, according to some Byzantine manuals, generally larger and slower than the Byzantine ones, perhaps indicating differences in construction, or the result of different types of wood being used. Like with the Byzantines, however, the terms adrumūnun and shalandī were often used interchangeably, along with the generic terms shīnī ('galley') and markab ḥarbi or asātīl ('warship'). Alternative interpretations consider the shīnī—which as a term appears relatively late and is particularly associated with the Levantine and North African coasts—a different, and larger, type of vessel than the common shalandī. The Ayyubid-era official and writer Ibn Mammati records that it had 140 oars, and featured a single mast with two to three lateen sails. Unlike the warships of Antiquity, medieval Arab and Byzantine ships did not feature rams, and the primary means of ship-to-ship combat were boarding actions and missile fire, as well as the use of inflammable materials such as Greek fire.

Transport vessels from Saladin's time are variously designated in the sources: sufun, a type of vessel which carried siege engines and other bulk freight; hammala, probably smaller than the sufun, and recorded as carrying men and supplies, including grain; and the little-known musattah ('flat ship'), which on one occasion is said to have had 500 people on board.

== See also ==
- Ancient Egyptian navy
- Tulunid navy
- Egyptian Navy

== Sources ==
- Agius, Dionisius Albertus (2001). "The Arab Šalandī". In Urbain Vermeulen; J. van Steenbergen (eds.). Egypt and Syria in the Fatimid, Ayyubid, and Mamluk Eras III: Proceedings of the 6th, 7th and 8th International Colloquium Organized at the Katholieke Universiteit Leuven in May 1997, 1998, and 1999. Peeters Publishers. pp. 49–60. ISBN 90-429-0970-6.
- Bianquis, Thierry (1998). "Autonomous Egypt from Ibn Tūlūn to Kāfūr, 868–969". In Petry, Carl F. (ed.). The Cambridge History of Egypt: Islamic Egypt, 640–1517. Vol. 1. Cambridge: Cambridge University Press. pp. 86–119. ISBN 0-521-47137-0.
- Blankinship, Khalid Yahya (1994). The End of the Jihâd State: The Reign of Hishām ibn ʻAbd al-Malik and the Collapse of the Umayyads. Albany, New York: State University of New York Press. ISBN 978-0-7914-1827-7.
- Bramoullé, David (2007). "Recruiting Crews in the Fatimid Navy (909–1171)". Medieval Encounters. 13: 4–31. doi:10.1163/157006707x173998.
- Bramoullé, David (2020). Les Fatimides et la mer (909–1171) (in French). Leiden and Boston: Brill. ISBN 978-90-04-410640.
- Brett, Michael (2001). The Rise of the Fatimids: The World of the Mediterranean and the Middle East in the Fourth Century of the Hijra, Tenth Century CE. The Medieval Mediterranean. Vol. 30. Leiden: Brill. ISBN 90-04-11741-5.
- Brett, Michael (2017). The Fatimid Empire. The Edinburgh History of the Islamic Empires. Edinburgh: Edinburgh University Press. ISBN 978-0-7486-4076-8.
- Canard, Marius (1942–1947). "L'impérialisme des Fatimides et leur propagande". Annales de l'Institut d'études orientales (in French). VI: 156–193.
- Canard, Marius (1965). "Fāṭimids". In Lewis, B.; Pellat, Ch. & Schacht, J. (eds.). The Encyclopaedia of Islam, Second Edition. Volume II: C–G. Leiden: E. J. Brill. pp. 850–862. OCLC 495469475.
- Dotson, John E. (1995). "Economics and Logistics of Galley Warfare". In Morrison, John S.; Gardiner, Robert (eds.). The Age of the Galley: Mediterranean Oared Vessels Since Pre-Classical Times. London: Conway Maritime Press. pp. 218–223. ISBN 0-85177-554-3.
- Ehrenkreutz, A. S. (2004). "Baḥriyya. I. The navy of the Arabs up to 1250". In Bearman, P. J.; Bianquis, Th.; Bosworth, C. E.; van Donzel, E. & Heinrichs, W. P. (eds.). The Encyclopaedia of Islam, Second Edition. Volume XII: Supplement. Leiden: E. J. Brill. pp. 119–121. ISBN 978-90-04-13974-9.
- Eickhoff, Ekkehard (1966). Seekrieg und Seepolitik zwischen Islam und Abendland: das Mittelmeer unter byzantinischer und arabischer Hegemonie (650–1040) (in German). De Gruyter.
- Halm, Heinz (1991). Das Reich des Mahdi: Der Aufstieg der Fatimiden [The Empire of the Mahdi: The Rise of the Fatimids] (in German). Munich: C. H. Beck. ISBN 978-3-406-35497-7.
- Halm, Heinz (1996). The Empire of the Mahdi: The Rise of the Fatimids. Handbook of Oriental Studies. Vol. 26. Translated by Michael Bonner. Leiden: Brill. ISBN 90-04-10056-3.
- Halm, Heinz (2003). Die Kalifen von Kairo: Die Fatimiden in Ägypten, 973–1074 [The Caliphs of Cairo: The Fatimids in Egypt, 973–1074] (in German). Munich: C. H. Beck. ISBN 3-406-48654-1.
- Halm, Heinz (2014). Kalifen und Assassinen: Ägypten und der vordere Orient zur Zeit der ersten Kreuzzüge, 1074–1171 [Caliphs and Assassins: Egypt and the Near East at the Time of the First Crusades, 1074–1171] (in German). Munich: C. H. Beck. doi:10.17104/9783406661648-1. ISBN 978-3-406-66163-1.
- Hamblin, William J. (1986). "The Fatimid Navy during the Early Crusades, 1099–1124". American Neptune. 46: 77–83. OCLC 1480480.
- Hathaway, Jane (2012). A Tale of Two Factions: Myth, Memory, and Identity in Ottoman Egypt and Yemen. Albany, New York: State University of New York Press. ISBN 978-0-7914-5883-9.
- Hocker, Frederick M. (1995). "Late Roman, Byzantine, and Islamic Galleys and Fleets". In Morrison, John S.; Gardiner, Robert (eds.). The Age of the Galley: Mediterranean Oared Vessels Since Pre-Classical Times. London: Conway Maritime Press. pp. 86–100. ISBN 0-85177-554-3.
- Kennedy, Hugh (2004) [1986]. The Prophet and the Age of the Caliphates: The Islamic Near East from the 6th to the 11th Century (Second ed.). Harlow: Longman. ISBN 978-0-582-40525-7.
- Kennedy, Hugh (2007). The Great Arab Conquests: How the Spread of Islam Changed the World We Live In. Philadelphia, Pennsylvania: Da Capo Press. ISBN 978-0-306-81740-3.
- Kubiak, Władyslaw B. (1970). "The Byzantine Attack on Damietta in 853 and the Egyptian Navy in the 9th Century". Byzantion. 40: 45–66. ISSN 0378-2506.
- Lev, Yaacov (1984). "The Fāṭimid Navy, Byzantium and the Mediterranean Sea, 909–1036 CE/297–427 AH". Byzantion. 54: 220–252. ISSN 0378-2506.
- Lev, Yaacov (1987). "Army, Regime, and Society in Fatimid Egypt, 358–487/968–1094". International Journal of Middle East Studies. 19 (3): 337–365. doi:10.1017/s0020743800056762. JSTOR 163658. S2CID 162310414.
- Lev, Yaacov (1990). "The Fatimid Navy and the Crusades, 1099–1171". In H. Tzalas (ed.). Tropis II Proceedings. 2nd International Symposium on Ship Construction in Antiquity, Delphi 1987. Athens: Hellenic Institute for the Preservation of Nautical Tradition. pp. 257–258.
- Lev, Yaacov (1991). State and Society in Fatimid Egypt. Leiden: Brill. ISBN 90-04-09344-3.
- Lev, Yaacov (1995). "The Fāṭimids and Byzantium, 10th–12th Centuries". Graeco-Arabica. 6: 190–208. OCLC 183390203.
- Lev, Yaacov (1999–2000). "The Fāṭimids and Byzantium, 10th–12th Centuries". Graeco-Arabica. 7–8: 273–281. OCLC 183390203.
- Lev, Yaacov (1999). Saladin in Egypt. Leiden, Boston, Köln: Brill. ISBN 90-04-11221-9.
- Pryor, John H. (1988). Geography, Technology, and War: Studies in the Maritime History of the Mediterranean, 649–1571. Cambridge University Press. ISBN 0-521-42892-0.
- Pryor, John H. (1995). "The Geographical Conditions of Galley Navigation in the Mediterranean". In Morrison, John S.; Gardiner, Robert (eds.). The Age of the Galley: Mediterranean Oared Vessels Since Pre-Classical Times. London: Conway Maritime Press. pp. 206–217. ISBN 0-85177-554-3.
- Pryor, John H.; Jeffreys, Elizabeth M. (2006). The Age of the ΔΡΟΜΩΝ: The Byzantine Navy ca. 500–1204. Brill. ISBN 978-90-04-15197-0.
- Pryor, John H. (2008). Kedar, Benjamin Z.; Riley-Smith, Jonathan S.C.; Phillips, Jonathan (eds.). "A View from the Masthead: The First Crusade from the Sea". Crusades. 7. Ashgate Publishing: 87–152. doi:10.1080/28327861.2008.12220214. ISSN 1476-5276.
