= Khalil ibn Ishaq al-Tamimi =

10th-century Fatamid Arab military commander

Khalil ibn Ishaq al-Tamimi (Arabic: خليل بن إسحاق التميمي) was a Sunni Arab military commander, in the service of the Fatimid Caliphate as head of the Arab jund of Ifriqiya. He was active as early as 913. From 937 to 941 he was the governor of Sicily, leading the brutal suppression of a large-scale anti-Fatimid revolt. He was captured and killed in 944, during the anti-Fatimid rebellion of Abu Yazid.

== Early career ==
Khalil was a Sunni Arab, and is first attested in 913, when he was the commander of the Arab settler militia (jund) of Kairouan, the capital of Ifriqiya. During that year, the Fatimid heir-apparent, al-Qa'im, suppressed the revolt of Tripoli, which had rebelled in the previous year against the overbearing presence of the Fatimids' Kutama Berber soldiery. In order to pacify the city and signal good will to its inhabitants, after its surrender in June 913, the Kutama were replaced as garrison by men of the Arab jund under Khalil. During this time, Khalil also began the reconstruction of the city's main mosque.

In 927, he commanded the jund contingents from all Ifriqiya in al-Qa'im's campaign against the Zenata Berbers of Muhammad ibn Khazar, who were successfully resisting Fatimid rule and threatening the Fatimid outpost of Tahert.

== Governorship of Sicily ==
A large-scale revolt against the Kutama-dominated and taxation-heavy Fatimid regime broke out in Sicily in April 937. The rebellion began at Agrigento, but spread quickly to the capital, Palermo, and other cities. The longtime Fatimid governor, Salim ibn Asad ibn Abi Rashid, found himself forced to lay siege to his own capital, and requested reinforcements from the Fatimid heartland in Ifriqiya.

The Fatimid caliph, al-Qa'im bi-Amr Allah, selected Khalil ibn Ishaq al-Tamimi to lead the reinforcements. Khalil arrived at Palermo on 23 October 937, and pursued the suppression of the city with great vigour: the city gates were removed, and a new citadel was constructed on the southeast side of the harbour and named al-Khalisa (lit. 'the Free One'), which gave its name to the quarter of Kalsa. According to the chronicler Ibn Idhari, his treatment of the Sicilians, both Muslim and Christian, was so brutal that many Muslims fled to Byzantine territory, where they converted to Christianity.

In March 938, he moved against Agrigento, laying siege to the city. The siege dragged on as the inhabitants of the city defended it vigorously, with almost daily sorties, and the onset of winter forced Khalil to withdraw to Palermo in October. The successful defence of Agrigento fanned the flames of rebellion in the rest of the island: Mazara and other cities rose in revolt as well. The Sicilian Muslims even sent a letter to the Byzantine emperor in Constantinople asking for his assistance. Emperor Romanos I Lekapenos indeed dispatched a fleet with some troops and supplies to the rebels.

Khalil also asked for reinforcements, and went on the offensive against the rebel strongholds. Over 939 and 940, he captured Mazara, Qal'at al-Ballut (modern Caltabellotta), Qal'at Abi Thawr (Caltavuturo), Qal'at al-Sirat (Collesano), and, in March 940, Qal'at Ablatano on the river Platani. Agrigento finally capitulated on 20 November 940 against guarantee of safe passage for the garrison, a promise which was immediately broken. The remaining rebel strongholds began to capitulate after that, and in September 941, Khalil was able to return to Ifriqiya. On the high sea, he had the captive notables of Agrigento put on a ship and sunk it, killing all of them. So many Sicilian Muslims again fled from the brutal suppression of the revolt to Byzantine territory, that the Fatimids agreed to renounce the Byzantine payment of tribute in exchange for truce, lest the Byzantines left the refugees to starve to death.

== Revolt of Abu Yazid ==
In February 944, a Kharijite revolt broke out among the Berbers of the Aurès Mountains, led by the ascetic preacher Abu Yazid. The rebellion spread quickly, taking the Fatimid regime by surprise: towns fell one after another, Kutama forces that tried to oppose the rebels were defeated, and on 7 August, the city of Laribus fell to Abu Yazid's men.

Reacting to this unforeseen threat, al-Qa'im dispatched his chief commanders to secure the main cities of Ifriqiya. Khalil with a thousand of his men was to hold Kairouan, where he busied himself with repairing the city's fortifications. On 13 October, Abu Yazid's forces appeared before the Aghlabid-era palace-city of Raqqada, which they plundered. Khalil resisted his officers' calls to march out and confront the rebel army, awaiting the arrival of the main Fatimid army under Maysur al-Fata, who also hesitated to move decisively against the rebels.

As a result, the disgruntled and unpaid soldiers of the jund began deserting to the rebels, until Khalil was left with only 400 men. Unable to man the city walls with this small a force, he withdrew to the governor's palace next to the Great Mosque of Kairouan. His efforts to contact Maysur failed because the messenger pigeons refused to take flight, and as Abu Yazid's troops entered Kairouan on 14 October, Khalil began to negotiate a writ of safety (aman) with the rebels. Most of his men used a rope to escape from the back of the palace, but Khalil, the city's chief qadi, the army treasurer and thirty others were taken prisoner and led to Abu Yazid in Raqqada. The rebel leader initially intended to spare Khalil's life, but his teacher, Abu Ammar, pointed out that dangerous foes should be killed. As a result, Abu Yazid, had Khalil and the chief qadi executed.

== Family ==
His brother Ya'qub was a Fatimid military commander who led the Fatimid sack of Genoa in 934.

== Sources ==
- Halm, Heinz (1991). Das Reich des Mahdi: Der Aufstieg der Fatimiden [The Empire of the Mahdi: The Rise of the Fatimids] (in German). Munich: C. H. Beck. ISBN 978-3-406-35497-7.
- Lilie, Ralph-Johannes; Ludwig, Claudia; Pratsch, Thomas; Zielke, Beate (2013). Prosopographie der mittelbyzantinischen Zeit Online. Berlin-Brandenburgische Akademie der Wissenschaften. Nach Vorarbeiten F. Winkelmanns erstellt (in German). Berlin and Boston: De Gruyter.

Preceded by Salim ibn Asad ibn Abi Rashid	Fatimid governor of Sicily; 937–941	Succeeded by Ibn Attaf
