= Mohammad Sabir =

Mohammad Sabir may refer to:

- Mohammad Sabir (Pakistani cricketer) (1943–1998)
- Mohammad Sabir (cricketer, born 2001), Afghan cricketer
- Mohammad Sabir (cricketer, born 2002), Afghan cricketer
- Mohammed Sabir (fl. 2006), British businessman
