= Ya'qub ibn Ishaq al-Tamimi =

Ya'qub ibn Ishaq al-Tamimi (Arabic: يعقوب بن إسحاق التميمي) was a pirate in Fatimid service who led a major raid against the Italian coasts, Sardinia and Corsica in 934–935.

== Naval expedition ==
Ya'qub was dispatched by Caliph al-Qa'im with a fleet of 20 vessels (according to the 15th-century Isma'ili historian Imadaddin Idris; Sunni sources report 30 ships) on 22 June 934 from al-Mahdiyya. Sailing from a western direction, he encountered some Christian merchant vessels, which he plundered and whose crews he took captive. The Fatimid fleet then captured Genoa by assault and plundered the city. During his return journey, he was attacked by Byzantine ships who had mobilized on the news of the sack of Genoa, but defeated them. He also raided Sardinia and Corsica before returning in triumph to al-Mahdiyya with some 8,000 prisoners.

Imadaddin places his return on 29 August 935, while there is some confusion on the expedition's dating in the Sunni sources—Ibn al-Athir reports two expeditions on consecutive years, the Cambridge Chronicle, Ibn Idari, al-Nuwayri, and Abu'l-Fida all place the expedition in 935, and Ibn Khaldun reports that the expedition was sent by al-Qa'im's predecessor, al-Mahdi. Imadaddin's account is generally considered the most accurate.

== Family ==
His brother Khalil was a senior commander in Fatimid service, in charge of the Arab jund of Kairouan from at least 913 to his death in 944.

== Sources ==
- Halm, Heinz (1991). Das Reich des Mahdi: Der Aufstieg der Fatimiden [The Empire of the Mahdi: The Rise of the Fatimids] (in German). Munich: C. H. Beck. ISBN 978-3-406-35497-7.
- Lev, Yaacov (1984). "The Fatimid Navy, Byzantium and the Mediterranean Sea, 909–1036 CE/297–427 AH". Byzantion. 54: 220–252. OCLC 1188035.
- Lilie, Ralph-Johannes; Ludwig, Claudia; Pratsch, Thomas; Zielke, Beate (2013). Prosopographie der mittelbyzantinischen Zeit Online. Berlin-Brandenburgische Akademie der Wissenschaften. Nach Vorarbeiten F. Winkelmanns erstellt (in German). Berlin and Boston: De Gruyter.
