= Abu Ja'far Muhammad ibn Ahmad al-Baghdadi =

10th-century Fatimid Caliphate senior official

Abu Ja'far Muhammad ibn Ahmad al-Baghdadi (Arabic: أبو جعفر محمد بن أحمد البغدادي) was an agent and senior official of the early Fatimid Caliphate.

== Life ==
As his nisbah indicates, Abu Ja'far Muhammad hailed from Baghdad, the capital of the Abbasid Caliphate. For unknown reasons, likely related to his pro-Shia views, he was persecuted by the vizier Ali ibn Isa ibn al-Jarrah and had to leave Iraq, making his way west. At Sijilmasa, where there was a sizeable Baghdadi colony, he met the Isma'ili leader and future founder of the Fatimid Caliphate, Abdallah al-Mahdi Billah.

Al-Baghdadi quickly found favour with al-Mahdi with his knowledge and ability, who employed him as advisor and secretary. He then spent some time in Cordoba, the capital of al-Andalus, where he became well known in the local literary circles; his true role, however, was as a spy, missionary and agent for al-Mahdi.

He returned from Cordoba and rejoined his master sometime before the latter was proclaimed caliph in 909, and became his chief secretary (katib) upon the death of the first holder of the post, Abu'l-Yusr al-Riyadi in January 911. In this capacity he headed the caliphal chancery, as well as the postal service (barid), which also served as an intelligence service. In this capacity he was "the perfect secretary" (Dachraoui), and quickly became the most influential member of al-Mahdi's court.

He continued in office after al-Mahdi's death in 934, and likely until his death, serving three Fatimid caliphs: al-Mahdi, al-Qa'im (r. 943–946), and al-Mansur (r. 946–953). The date of his death is unknown. His successor was the slave Jawhar al-Siqilli, who would go on to serve as a distinguished military commander and conquer Egypt for the Fatimids.

== Sources ==
- Brett, Michael (2017). The Fatimid Empire. The Edinburgh History of the Islamic Empires. Edinburgh: Edinburgh University Press. ISBN 978-0-7486-4076-8.
- Dachraoui, Farhat (1981). Le Califat Fatimide au Maghreb (296-365 H. / 909-975 Jc.). Historie Politique et Institutions [The Fatimid Caliphate in the Maghreb (296-365 AH / 909-975 CE). Political History and Institutions] (PhD thesis) (in French). Tunis.
- Halm, Heinz (1991). Das Reich des Mahdi: Der Aufstieg der Fatimiden [The Empire of the Mahdi: The Rise of the Fatimids] (in German). Munich: C. H. Beck. ISBN 978-3-406-35497-7.

Preceded by Abu'l-Yusr al-Riyadi	Secretary of the Fatimid caliph 911–946/953	Succeeded by Jawhar al-Siqilli
