= Salim ibn Asad ibn Abi Rashid =

10th-century Fatimid Caliphate leader

Salim ibn Asad ibn Abi Rashid (Arabic: سالم بن أسد بن أبي راشد) was the governor of Sicily for the Fatimid Caliphate for twenty years, from 917 to 937.

== Governorship ==
Salim was appointed to the office in 917, following the suppression of a rebellion of the local Sicilian troops (the jund) under Ahmad ibn Qurhub, and the siege and capitulation of the island's capital, Palermo, in 916–917. In the aftermath of this revolt, the jund was disarmed and dispossessed, and a garrison of Kutama Berbers, loyal to the Fatimid regime, was installed on the island. Following this turbulent start to Fatimid rule over Sicily, the stronger Fatimid presence allowed Salim to secure relative tranquility for the island over twenty years, even though the third Fatimid caliph, al-Mansur bi-Nasr Allah, is said to have remarked of him disparagingly that he was nothing more than a "donkey standing on two feet".

As governor of Sicily, he was also responsible for the perennial, mostly naval war with the Byzantine Empire in southern Italy and the last Byzantine strongholds in northeastern Sicily (the Val Demone). During the Sicilian revolt, the rebel emir Ibn Qurhub had agreed a truce with the local Byzantine strategos in Calabria in exchange for an annual payment of 22,000 gold coins, but apparently this payment had lapsed since. Thus, in August 918 he led a night attack on Rhegion (modern Reggio Calabria) which was captured and sacked. In the following year, however, a truce was signed with Taormina and the other Byzantine strongholds of the Val Demone, possibly so that the Muslim forces could be concentrated on the Italian mainland, where Fatimid forces, with reinforcements from Ifriqiya, launched raids in 922/3 and 924.

In 928, Salim led the campaign himself, along with Sabir al-Fata, who commanded the Ifriqiyan troops. They attacked a locality named al-Ghiran ("the caves") in Apulia, Taranto and Otranto were sacked, and Salerno and Naples forced to pay heavy tribute in money and precious brocades to avoid being attacked. It was an outbreak of the plague which finally forced the expedition to return to Sicily, but they soon returned to Calabria and imposed the head tax (jizya) from the local inhabitants; according to the 14th-century historian al-Nuwayri, this tax was paid until the death of Caliph al-Mahdi Billah in 934.

The growing resentment of the Sicilians for the Kutama-dominated and tax-heavy Fatimid regime finally broke out in April 937, when the populace of Agrigento expelled their governor. Salim sent an army of Kutama Berbers against the city under Abu Duqaq, but he was defeated, and the inhabitants of Agrigento, themselves mostly (non-Kutama) Berbers, marched on Palermo. Salim managed to beat them back, but in September, Palermo too rose in revolt, forcing Salim to lay siege to his own capital. The Byzantines assisted the rebels, and Salim was forced to ask for reinforcements from Ifriqiya. Fresh troops under Khalil ibn Ishaq al-Tamimi arrived in October, and Khalil, who now became governor, was quickly able to subdue Palermo, but the revolt was not fully suppressed until 941.

Salim died in 939 at his palace.

== Sources ==
- Halm, Heinz (1991). Das Reich des Mahdi: Der Aufstieg der Fatimiden [The Empire of the Mahdi: The Rise of the Fatimids] (in German). Munich: C. H. Beck. ISBN 978-3-406-35497-7.
- Lev, Yaacov (1984). "The Fāṭimid Navy, Byzantium and the Mediterranean Sea, 909–1036 CE/297–427 AH". Byzantion. 54: 220–252. ISSN 0378-2506.
- Lilie, Ralph-Johannes; Ludwig, Claudia; Pratsch, Thomas; Zielke, Beate (2013). Prosopographie der mittelbyzantinischen Zeit Online. Berlin-Brandenburgische Akademie der Wissenschaften. Nach Vorarbeiten F. Winkelmanns erstellt (in German). Berlin and Boston: De Gruyter.
- Metcalfe, Alex (2009). The Muslims of Medieval Italy. Edinburgh: Edinburgh University Press. ISBN 978-0-7486-2008-1.

Preceded by Abu Sa'id Musa ibn Ahmad al-Daif	Fatimid governor of Sicily; 917–937	Succeeded by Khalil ibn Ishaq al-Tamimi
