= Darquba =

Village and municipality in Azerbaijan

Coordinates: 38°44′N 48°49′E

Darquba is a village and municipality in the Lankaran Rayon of Azerbaijan. It has a population of 1,365. The municipality consists of the villages of Darquba and Səbir.
