= Səbir =

Coordinates: 38°43′N 48°49′E

Səbir is a village in the municipality of Darquba in the Lankaran Rayon of Azerbaijan.
