= Sabir, Shamakhi =

Sabir
- Municipality
- Location within Azerbaijan
- Coordinates: 40°35′29″N 48°42′21″E
- Country: Azerbaijan
- Rayon: Shamakhi

Population (2008)
  - Total: 4,055
- Time zone: UTC+4 (AZT)
  - Summer (DST): UTC+5 (AZT)

Sabir is a village and municipality in the Shamakhi Rayon of Azerbaijan. It has a population of 4,055 (as of 2008).
