= Sabir Ganjali =

Azerbaijani writer and journalist

- Sabir Gəncəli
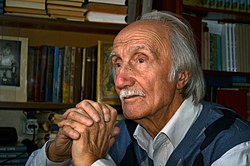
- Born: 26 July 1932; Ganja, Azerbaijan
- Died: 16 July 2025 (aged 92); Baku, Azerbaijan
- Education: Baku State University, Faculty of Philology
- Occupations: Writer, journalist, publicist, historian
- Writing career
- Notable works: Pages from Life, Enlightened Women of Azerbaijan, Everything As It Is…
- Notable awards: "Progress" Medal Taraqqi by decree of the President of Azerbaijan (2015)

Sabir Ganjali (Azerbaijani: Sabir Gəncəli; full name: Sabir Süleyman oğlu Məmmədov; 26 July 1932 – 16 July 2025) was an Azerbaijani writer, journalist, publicist, and historian. He contributed extensively to Azerbaijani literature, journalism, and historical research, focusing on national identity, culture, and the role of women in society.

== Biography ==
Ganjali was born in Ganja, Azerbaijan, and began his literary career in the 1950s. He studied at the M. Ə. Sabir secondary and primary art schools and later enrolled in Baku State University’s Faculty of Philology (Journalism) from 1952 to 1957.

He worked at the Bakı newspaper from 1958 to 1963 and then at the editorial office of Azərbaycan Qadını magazine as a literary employee (1963–1967). From 1967 to 1975, he served as a senior researcher at the Azerbaijan Scientific‑Research Pedagogical Institute, and from 1976 to 2010 he was the responsible secretary of Azərbaycan Qadını magazine.

Between 2000 and 2014, he lectured at the Azerbaijan Public Political University on subjects such as “History of Azerbaijani Press” and “Journalism Skills”.

Ganjali died on 16 July 2025 in Baku at the age of 92.

== Career and contributions ==
Ganjali wrote more than 1,000 articles, historical essays, documentary stories, and two documentary novellas. His research focused on Azerbaijani cultural figures, especially women, and chronicled social, educational, and intellectual history.

He defended a candidate thesis in 1967 on “The role of Azerbaijani women in developing enlightenment and culture in the early 19th century,” and in 1996 received a doctoral degree from the Institute of Oriental Studies, Azerbaijan National Academy of Sciences, with the dissertation “Women’s education and the role of progressive Azerbaijani women (second half of the 19th century until 1920).

Ganjali published over 20 books, in multiple languages, including Azerbaijani, Russian, English, Arabic, and Persian. His works cover women’s movements, national educators, cultural figures, and historical memory.

== Selected works ==
- İşıqlı yollar (1959)
- Cəfər Babayev: Canlı xatirələr (1960)
- 18 ay düşmən arxasında (1965)
- Üç qız, üç tale (1970)
- Hər şey olduğu kimi… (2009)
- Ömürdən səhifələr (1973)
- Azərbaycanın maarifpərvər qadınları (1960)
- Nurlu ömürlərin dastanı (1975)
- Tərəqqi yollarında (1975)
- Azadlıq yollarında (1980)
- Qadın, gözəllik və ülviyyət (ensiklopedik toplu). Bakı: Azərbaycan nəşriyyatı (2001),
- Azərbaycan qadınlarının həyat və mübarizə salnaməsi (2017)
- Azərbaycan mətbuatının şəfəqləri (2020)

== Awards ==
- Tərəqqi Medal (Progress Medal) — 2015
- Qızıl Qələm (Golden Pen) Award — 1983, 1996
- Honorary title “Peace Ambassador” — 2006
- Honorary Diploma of the Azerbaijan Press Council — 2015

== Legacy ==
Sabir Ganjali is remembered as a prolific intellectual chronicling Azerbaijani cultural, social, and intellectual history, with a particular emphasis on women's roles in education and cultural development.

== Bibliography ==
- Rzayeva, Pərvanə. "Ədəbi məktəbin əbədiyyət çırağını yandıranlar: "Sabir Gəncəli"
- "Yüzlərlə imzalar tanındı"
- "Hər şey olduğu kimi, demək bu vicdan işidir"
- " Azərbaycan Demokratik Respublikası Qadınlarımızın Taleyində"
