= Sabir Ali =

Sabir Ali may refer to:

== People ==
- Sabir Ali (decathlete) (1955–2023), Indian decathlete
- Sabir Ali (Emirati cricketer) (born 1991), Pakistani-Emirati cricketer
- Sabir Ali (Indian cricketer) (born 1981), Indian cricketer
- Sabir Ali (politician) (born 1970), Indian politician
