= Fatimid sack of Genoa =

Muslim raid in the Mediterranean

The Fatimid Caliphate conducted a major raid on the Ligurian coast in 934–935, culminating in the sack of its major port, Genoa, on 16 August 935. The coasts of Spain and southern France may also have been raided and the islands of Corsica and Sardinia certainly were. It was one of the most impressive accomplishments of the Fatimid navy.

At the time, the Fatimids were based in North Africa, with their capital at Mahdia. The raid of 934–35 was the high point of their domination of the Mediterranean. They never again raided so far afield with so much success. At the time, Genoa was only a small port in the Kingdom of Italy. How wealthy Genoa was is not known, but the sack is sometimes taken as evidence of a certain economic vitality. The destruction, however, almost certainly set the city back years.

== Sources ==
There is no strictly contemporary source for the raiding expedition of 934–35, but Latin (Christian) and Arabic (Muslim) sources broadly agree about the course of events. The earliest source is the Antapodosis of Bishop Liudprand of Cremona, written in the 960s. After relating a raid by the Muslims of Fraxinetum on the city of Acqui, which he describes as fifty miles from Pavia, Liudprand records:

At the same time, in the Genoese city, which has been built in the Cottian Alps, overlooking the African sea, eighty miles distant from Pavia, a spring flowed most copiously with blood, clearly suggesting to all a coming calamity. Indeed, in the same year, the Phoenicians [North Africans] arrived there with a multitude of fleets, and while the citizens were unaware, they entered the city, killing all except women and children. Then, placing all the treasures of the city and the churches of God in their ships, they returned to Africa.

The earliest Islamic account, the Chronicle of Cambridge, was written after 965 and perhaps as late as the eleventh century. It says only that the Caliph al-Qa'im, who had succeeded to the throne earlier that year, sent a fleet to Genoa and captured it. Later and generally less reliable Arabic accounts offer greater detail. The most important of these is that of the Isma'ili historian Idris Imad al-Din, who died in 1468. He relied on earlier, now lost, Isma'ili (Fatimid) sources.

== Raid ==
According to the Muslims sources, a fleet of ships left Mahdia under the command of Ya'qub ibn Ishaq on 18 June 934 (7 Rajab 322) to attack the Rums (Christians). The sources do not agree on the number of ships: Ibn al-Athir gives thirty, while Imad al-Din says twenty. According to Imad al-Din, "on the way [Ya'qub] encountered Rumi ships loaded with merchandise; he captured them and took prisoner those who were on board."

The Fatimid fleet then approached Genoa from the west, from the direction of Spain, having apparently sailed along the coast and across the Gulf of Lion. At some point, Genoa, which Imad al-Din describes as a "well-fortified city", became the prime target of the raid. Although other cities, including Pisa, were probably attacked, none are named in the extant sources. Some sources indicate that Corsica and Sardinia were also raided, possibly on the return voyage from Genoa to Mahdia. At Genoa, fighting took place outside the city walls and later in the streets of the city. The Fatimid forces having the upper hand, the city was plundered and burnt on 16 August 935, according to Ibn al-Athir. The fleet returned to Mahdia on 28 August 935 (26 Ramadan 323), twelve days after the sack.

Upon Ya'qub's return to Mahdia, the caliph held a triumph for him. According to Imad al-Din, "the prisoners were exhibited and the fleet was decorated" while Ya'qub "entered the city wearing his most beautiful clothes". He then conferred with the caliph al-Qa'im, sitting in a special dar al-bahr (sea pavilion), and was offered any sum of money asked to be distributed to the soldiers, a request which Imad al-Din says the caliph honoured.

== Legacy ==
The extent of the destruction in Genoa is known only from literary sources, which tend to exaggerate. Al-Dhahabi records 1,000 women sold into slavery and Imad al-Din gives 8,000 prisoners total. Both numbers are too high to be credible. Nonetheless, the city may have been completely depopulated for some years after the sack.

The sack of Genoa in 935 has led to some discussion about whether early tenth-century Genoa was "hardly more than a fishing village" or a vibrant trading town worth attacking. Benjamin Kedar, who is responsible for drawing scholars' attention to the potential relevance of Imad al-Din on this question, argues that the linen and raw silk mentioned among the loot carried away by the Fatimids are evidence of trade with the Islamic world. He sees these things as among the "treasures" mentioned by Liudprand. Imad al-Din, however, is a late source. Contemporary documentary sources are utterly lacking. Genoese charters only survive in significant numbers from the second half of the tenth century onwards, a fact which itself may be a result of the destruction wrought in 935.

In the late thirteenth century, Jacopo da Varagine believed that the Genoese fleet had been away when the Fatimids attacked. After returning, it pursued the attackers and rescued the captives.

== Sources ==
- Balzaretti, Ross (2013). Dark Age Liguria: Regional Identity and Local Power, c. 400–1020. Bloomsbury Academic.
- Epstein, Steven A. (1996). Genoa and the Genoese, 958–1528. Chapel Hill, N.C.: University of North Carolina Press. ISBN 978-0-8078-4992-7.
- Graziani, Antoine-Marie [in French] (2009). Histoire de Gênes. Fayard.
- Kedar, Benjamin (1997). "Una nuova fonte per l'incursione musulmana del 934–935 e le sue implicazioni per la storia genovese". In Laura Balletto (ed.). Oriente e occidente tra medioevo ed età moderna: Studi in onore di Geo Pistarino. Vol. 2. Genoa. pp. 605–16.
- Lev, Yaacov (2012). "A Mediterranean Encounter: The Fatimids and Europe, Tenth to Twelfth Centuries". In Ruthy Gertwagen; Elizabeth Jeffreys (eds.). Shipping, Trade and Crusade in the Medieval Mediterranean: Studies in Honour of John Pryor. Ashgate. pp. 131–56.
- Pavoni, Romeo (1992). Liguria medievale: da provincia romana a stato regionale. ECIG.
- Picard, Christophe (2018). Sea of the Caliphs: The Mediterranean in the Medieval Islamic World. Belknap Press of Harvard University Press.
- Pryor, John; Jeffreys, Elizabeth M. (2006). The Age of the ΔΡΟΜΩΝ: The Byzantine Navy ca 500–1204. E. J. Brill.
- Squatriti, Paolo, ed. (2007). The Complete Works of Liudprand of Cremona. Catholic University of America Press.
- Stanton, Charles D. (2015). Medieval Maritime Warfare. Pen & Sword.
