= Sabirkənd, Shamkir =

Sabirkənd
- Municipality
- Location within Azerbaijan
- Coordinates: 40°53′55″N 45°54′53″E
- Country: Azerbaijan
- Rayon: Shamkir

Population
  - Total: 4,650
- Time zone: UTC+4 (AZT)
  - Summer (DST): UTC+5 (AZT)

Sabirkənd (also, Sabir and Sabirkend) is a village and municipality in the Shamkir Rayon of Azerbaijan. It has a population of 4,650.
