= Mohammed Sabir =

British businessman (1939–2024)

Mohammed Sabir MBE
- Born: 14 December 1939; Chakswari, Jammu and Kashmir, British India (now Pakistan)
- Died: 5 October 2024 (aged 84); England
- Citizenship: United Kingdom, Pakistani dual citizenship
- Occupation: Businessman

Mohammed Sabir MBE (14 December 1939 – 5 October 2024) was a British businessman who was chair of the Aagrah group of restaurants, which is based in Bradford, West Yorkshire.

He was born on 14 December 1939, in Chakswari, Mirpur District, Pakistan.

Sabir was appointed a Member of the Order of the British Empire (MBE) in the 2006 New Year Honours for charitable services in West Yorkshire.

He died on 5 October 2024, at the age of 84.
