= Sabir al-Fata =

Sabir al-Fata was a freedman who served the Fatimid caliph al-Mahdi Billah as a governor and military commander.

== Life ==
As his sobriquet of al-Fata (lit. 'the young hero') demonstrates, Sabir was a Slavic (saqaliba) military slave who had been set free and made an officer of the Fatimid army. His original master had been Ibn Qurhub.

He served under the first Fatimid caliph, al-Mahdi Billah, as governor of Kairouan. In 927/28, he was sent to Sicily with a fleet of 44 ships to launch an offensive against the Byzantine Empire's provinces in southern Italy. In 928 with 30 ships, and joined by the Fatimid governor of Sicily, Salim ibn Abi Rashid, he attacked a locality named al-Ghiran ('the caves') in Apulia, and proceeded to sack the cities of Taranto and Otranto. At the sack of Taranto, on 17 August 928, some 6,000 inhabitants are reported to have been killed.

The outbreak of a disease forced them to return to Sicily, but then Sabir led his fleet up the Tyrrhenian Sea, forcing Salerno and Naples to ransom themselves with money and precious brocades. In 929, with four ships he defeated the seven ships of the local Byzantine strategos on the Adriatic coast, and sacked Termoli. He returned to the Fatimid capital, al-Mahdiya, on 5 September 930, bringing 18,000 prisoners with him.

His successes encouraged Caliph al-Mahdi to prepare a new, even larger naval expedition against the Byzantines in Italy, but the arrival of a Byzantine embassy led to the conclusion of a treaty instead (931/32).

== Sources ==
- Halm, Heinz (1991). Das Reich des Mahdi: Der Aufstieg der Fatimiden [The Empire of the Mahdi: The Rise of the Fatimids] (in German). Munich: C. H. Beck. ISBN 978-3-406-35497-7.
- Lev, Yaacov (1984). "The Fāṭimid Navy, Byzantium and the Mediterranean Sea, 909–1036 CE/297–427 AH". Byzantion. 54: 220–252. ISSN 0378-2506.
- Lilie, Ralph-Johannes; Ludwig, Claudia; Pratsch, Thomas; Zielke, Beate (2013). Prosopographie der mittelbyzantinischen Zeit Online. Berlin-Brandenburgische Akademie der Wissenschaften. Nach Vorarbeiten F. Winkelmanns erstellt (in German). Berlin and Boston: De Gruyter.
