= Jund =

Military division

Under the early Caliphates, a jund (Arabic: جند; plural ajnad, أجناد) was a military division, which became applied to the military territory in the conquered lands of the Arabs and, most notably, to the provinces into which Greater Syria (i.e., the Levant) was divided.

The term jund later acquired various additional meanings throughout the Muslim world.

== Origin ==
The term jund from the root (i.e., J-N-D military) in Arabic refers to a group of supporters (which could, also, refer to a group in general), according to the Lisan al-Arab, and appears in the Quran to designate an armed troop.

Under the Umayyad Caliphate, it ascended to a more technical sense to "military settlements and districts in which were quartered Arab soldiers who could be mobilized for seasonal campaigns or for more protracted expeditions" as well as the "corresponding army corps", following Dominique Sourdel.

Gradually, however — and aside from its technical use for the provinces of Syria (see below) — the term acquired a broader meaning of the entire armed forces of a state. Thus one of the caliphal fiscal departments, the diwan al-jund, administered the pay and provisions of the army. In addition, the geographers of the ninth and tenth centuries used the term ajnad as an equivalent of amṣar or large towns.

== Syria ==
Syria (Bilad al-Sham) and its provinces (ajnad) under the Abbasid Caliphate in the 9th century

The most notable use of the term was in Syria, where already the Rashidun Caliph Umar is credited with dividing the region into four ajnad: Hims (Jund Hims), Damascus (Jund Dimashq), Jordan (Jund al-Urdunn), and Palestine (Jund Filastin). The Umayyad Caliph Yazid I then added the district of Qinnasrin (Jund Qinnasrin). This practice remained unique to Syria and was not emulated in any other province of the Caliphates, which were usually headed by a single governor; hence they were often referred to collectively as al-Shamat, "the Syrias".

The circumscriptions of the ajnad by and large followed the preexisting Byzantine provincial boundaries, but with modifications. As K. Y. Blankinship notes, their inception as elements of a system of military defense, aimed at safeguarding control over Syria and defending against any Byzantine assault, is evident by the placement of the new provinces' capitals at even distances from each other—to function as control and mobilization centers—and securely in the interior, far from any seaborne attack. The army corps of the ajnad of Syria comprised exclusively Arabs, who received a regular salary (ʿatāʾ) drawn from the income of the land tax (kharāj), in addition to which they received land grants. On campaign, they were accompanied by retainers (shākiriyya) and reinforced by volunteers (mutaţawwiʿa).

The division into ajnad continued in Syria under the Abbasid Caliphate and beyond, until well into Mamluk times. Under the Abbasids, a governor-general of Syria often presided over all of the districts, while in 785 Harun al-Rashid added the new district of Jund al-'Awasim in the north, encompassing the frontier zone with the Byzantines.

== Egypt ==
In Egypt, soon after its conquest, a military district (miṣr) was established in Fustat. The Arab settlers who comprised it became known as the jund of Egypt. They too, like the Syrian ajnad, were inscribed on the army rolls (dīwān) and received a regular salary. For long they provided the only Muslim military force in the province, and played a major role in the political life of the country, jealously safeguarding their privileged position for the first two centuries of the Islamic period, until their power was broken in the turmoils of the Fourth Fitna.

== Al-Andalus ==
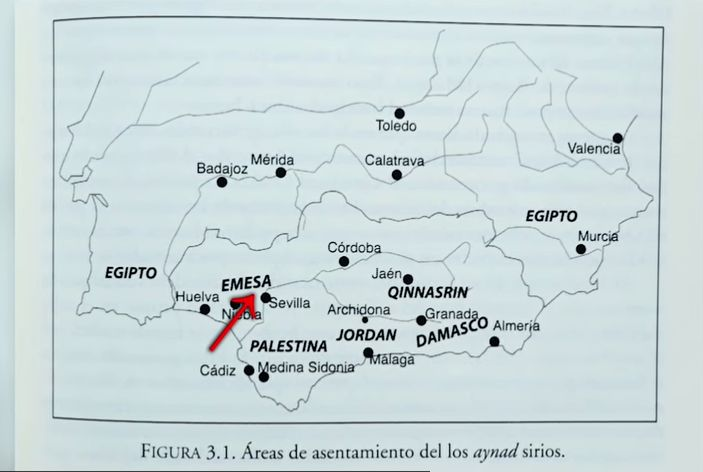
Map of the jund

The jund system in some form seems to have been introduced in Muslim Spain (al-Andalus) as well: in 742, the troops involved in the ongoing conquest of the peninsula were allotted lands in nine districts (mujannada). By the 10th century, the term jund came to encompass these men alongside the enlisted volunteers (ḥushud) as distinct from foreign mercenaries (ḥasham).

== Maghrib ==
In the Maghrib, beginning with the Aghlabid rulers of Ifriqiya, the term jund came to be applied to the personal guard of the ruler, and henceforth "kept a restricted sense which is often difficult to define, rarely applying to the whole army" (D. Sourdel). A similar usage is evident in Mamluk Egypt, where the term applied to a specific section of the sultan's personal troops, though not his actual bodyguard.

== See also ==
- Jund al-Sham, extremist Islamic group

== Sources ==
- Blankinship, Khalid Yahya (1994). The End of the Jihâd State: The Reign of Hishām ibn ʻAbd al-Malik and the Collapse of the Umayyads. Albany, New York: State University of New York Press. ISBN 978-0-7914-1827-7.
- Cobb, Paul M. (2001). White banners: contention in 'Abbāsid Syria, 750–880. Albany, NY: State University of New York Press. ISBN 0-7914-4880-0.
- Kennedy, Hugh (1998). "Egypt as a Province in the Islamic Caliphate, 641–868". In Petry, Carl F. (ed.). The Cambridge History of Egypt: Islamic Egypt, 640–1517. Vol. 1. Cambridge: Cambridge University Press. pp. 62–85. ISBN 0-521-47137-0.
- Sourdel, D. (1965). "D̲j̲und". In Lewis, B.; Pellat, Ch. & Schacht, J. (eds.). The Encyclopaedia of Islam, Second Edition. Volume II: C–G. Leiden: E. J. Brill. pp. 601–602. OCLC 495469475.
