= Fatimid coinage =

Medieval Islamic coinage

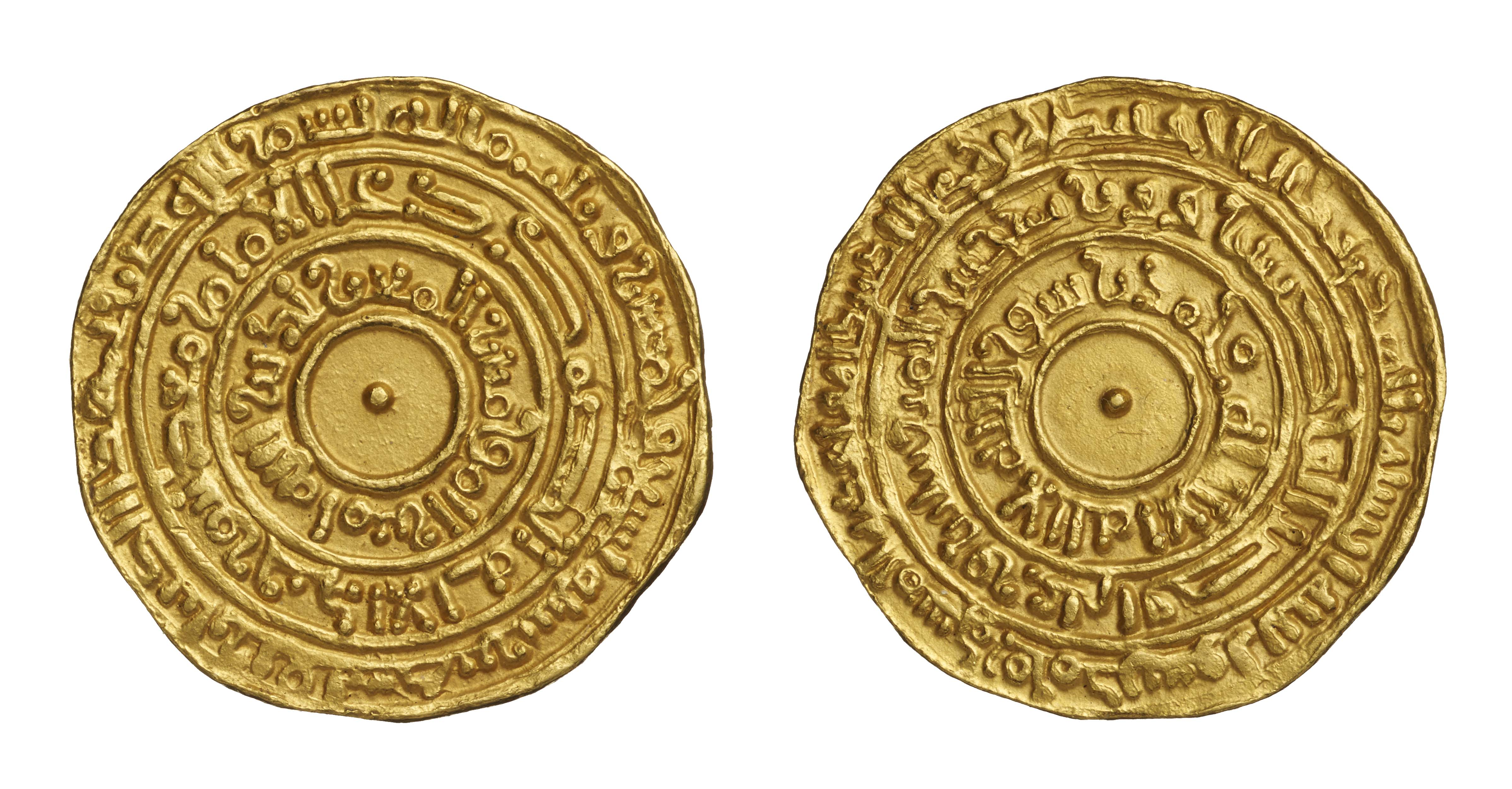
Gold dinar of al-Mu'izz, struck in Palestine in 969 or 970.

Fatimid coinage comes from the Fatimid Caliphate, an Isma'ili Shi'a empire that ruled large parts of North Africa, western Arabia, and the Levant, first from Tunisia (Ifriqiya) and then from Egypt. The coinage was minted after the typical pattern of Islamic coinage. The Fatimids were particularly known for the consistently high quality of their gold dinars, which proved a potent political tool in their conquest of Egypt and led to them being widely imitated by the Crusader states in the 12th century. Fatimid silver coinage (dirhams) on the other hand, although widely issued, declined in quality with the weakening of the Fatimid state, and has been mostly ignored in modern times. The Fatimids minted almost no copper coinage. Starting from designs imitating Abbasid coinage, adapted merely with slogans befitting the new regime and the names of the Fatimid caliphs, from the reign of Caliph al-Mu'izz on, Fatimid coinage included overtly Shi'a formulas and achieved a distinctive look, with concentric inscribed bands, that was maintained until the end of the dynasty.

== Background ==
The Fatimid dynasty claimed descent from Fatima, the daughter of Muhammad and wife of Ali, through Isma'il, the son of the last commonly accepted Shi'a Imam, Ja'far al-Sadiq. This claim was often disputed even by their contemporaries, especially the Sunnis. The secretiveness of the family before c. 890 and the differing genealogies subsequently published by the dynasty itself further make it difficult for modern scholars to assess the exact origin of the dynasty. Whatever their true origin, the Fatimids were the leaders of the Isma'ili sect of Shi'ism, and they headed a movement which, in the words of the historian Marius Canard, "was at the same time political and religious, philosophical and social, and whose adherents expected the appearance of a Mahdi descended from the Prophet through Ali and Fatima". Therefore, unlike their contemporary rivals, the Abbasid and Umayyad caliphs, the Fatimid caliphs were not just secular rulers ruling over a diverse population of Muslim, Christian, or Jewish subjects, but above all Isma'ili imams: for the Isma'ili faithful, they were the ultimate, infallible and divinely guided authorities on matters of faith.

The right to be named on coinage and in the sermon of the Friday prayer were the two most common attributes and prerogatives of sovereignty in the medieval Islamic world, with the removal of rulers' names or the addition of new ones being the chief symbolic signifier of changes in political or religious allegiance of a province or local potentate. Consequently, already during the abortive pro-Fatimid revolt led by al-Husayn ibn Zakarawayh in Syria in 903, coins were issued at the mint of Homs on behalf of the—yet unnamed—Mahdi, and in the Friday sermon the name of the Abbasid caliph al-Muktafi was dropped in favour of the "Successor, the rightly-guided Heir, the Lord of the Age, the Commander of the Faithful, the Mahdi".

== History of Fatimid coinage ==
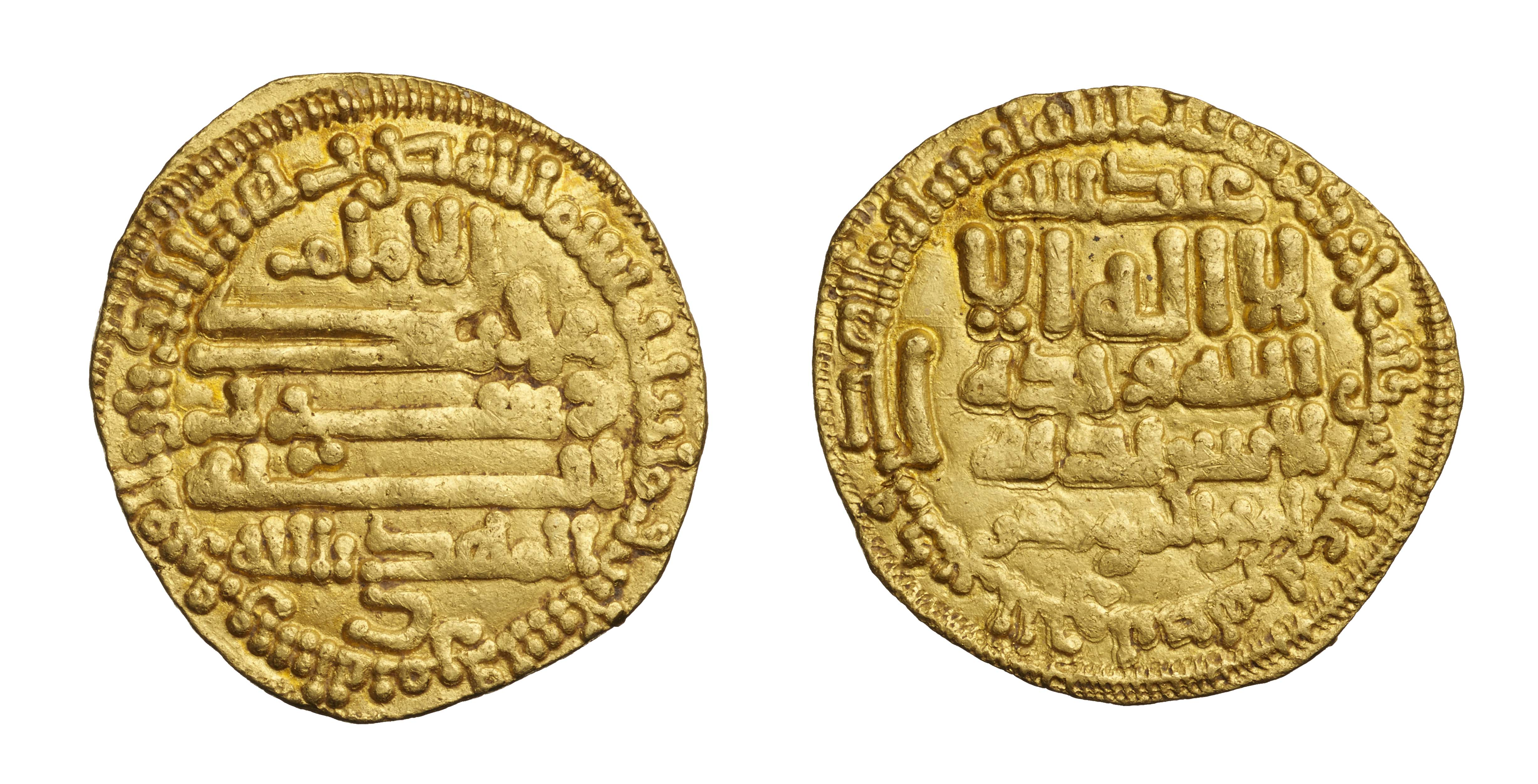
Early Fatimid gold dinar of al-Mahdi, struck at Kairouan in 910 or 911.

The Fatimids followed the usual Islamic pattern of gold dinars and silver dirhams, along with fractions and multiples thereof. Copper or bronze coins survive, but they were likely not issued as the standard fals, but rather as fractions of the dirham. From the coins surviving to the present, the most frequent ones are full dinars and half-dirhams, although there are regional variations. For example, in Sicily, the quarter-dinar—introduced by the Aghlabids, it remained the island's standard gold coin even after the Fatimid period as the tarì—is by far the most common issue, while the half-dirham is almost non-existent. Given the lack of copper coinage and the neglect of silver coinage by modern collectors, modern studies on Fatimid coinage primarily focus on the Fatimid gold dinars.

=== Early Fatimid coins ===
The first Fatimid coins were minted soon after the conquest of the Aghlabid emirate in Ifriqiya by the army of the Isma'ili missionary Abu Abdallah al-Shi'i, who became regent on behalf of the absent Fatimid imam. That imam, Abdallah al-Mahdi, was still in hiding at Sijilmasa, and his name unknown even to Abu Abdallah, who had never seen him. As a result, the new coins bore generic phrases heralding a new age, without naming a ruler: "The Proof of God [i.e. the Mahdi] has arrived" on the one side and "The enemies of God are scattered" on the other. The Ifriqiyans called these nameless coins as Sayyidiyya, from the honorific appellation sayyid, 'lord', applied to Abu Abdallah. Another slogan that appeared then on the coinage, "Praise be to God, Lord of the Universe", became "the motto and signature for all of the Fatimid caliphs".

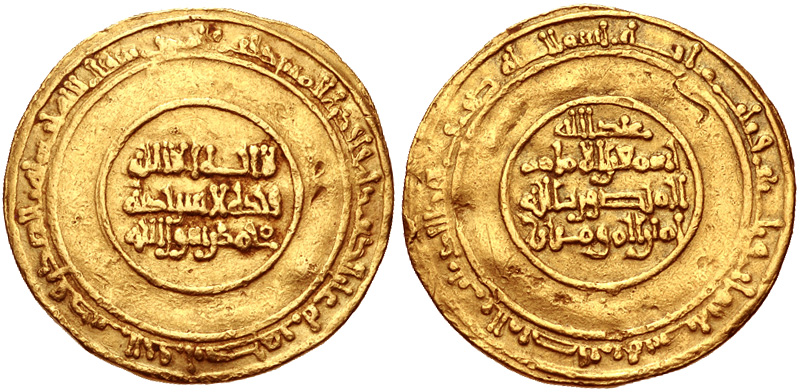
Gold dinar of al-Mansur, struck at Mansuriya in 949 or 950.

When Abdallah al-Mahdi assumed the throne in 910, he put his name and claimed titles on the coins: al-Imam al-Mahdi bi'llah Abdallah Amir al-Mu'minin, "The Imam rightly guided by God Abdallah, Commander of the Faithful". Otherwise his coins were identical to the contemporary Abbasid ones, including bead-like terminals on the lettering. This was a natural choice, since the mint and its craftsmen had been inherited from the Aghlabids, who followed the Abbasid pattern, and sudden changes in coinage are typically seen with distrust by the public. For the first years of the new regime, Aghlabid coins likely continued to circulate side-by-side with new Fatimid ones, until the former had been melted and re-minted as Fatimid coins.

The second caliph, al-Qa'im (r. 934–946), changed the designs for the first time away from the Abbasid pattern: the calligraphy became more refined, and the circular border was doubled in size. The coins of the third caliph, al-Mansur, for the first two years of his reign (AH 334 and 335, corresponding to 946/7 and 947/8 CE) still bore the name of al-Qa'im, who had died on 17 May 946, as al-Mansur was engaged in the suppression of the revolt of Abu Yazid and kept his father's death secret. The rebels also minted gold dinars of their own at Kairouan, including Sunni and Kharijite formulas in direct challenge to Fatimid claims. Only after the defeat and death of the rebel leader in August 947 did al-Mansur now publicly proclaim himself as caliph: the first issue with his name dates to May/June 948. Al-Mansur also introduced the first major changes in the design of the coins, by introducing a concentric outer inscription around a central, horizontally inscribed field, and removing any inscription from the inner band.

=== Changes under al-Mu'izz ===
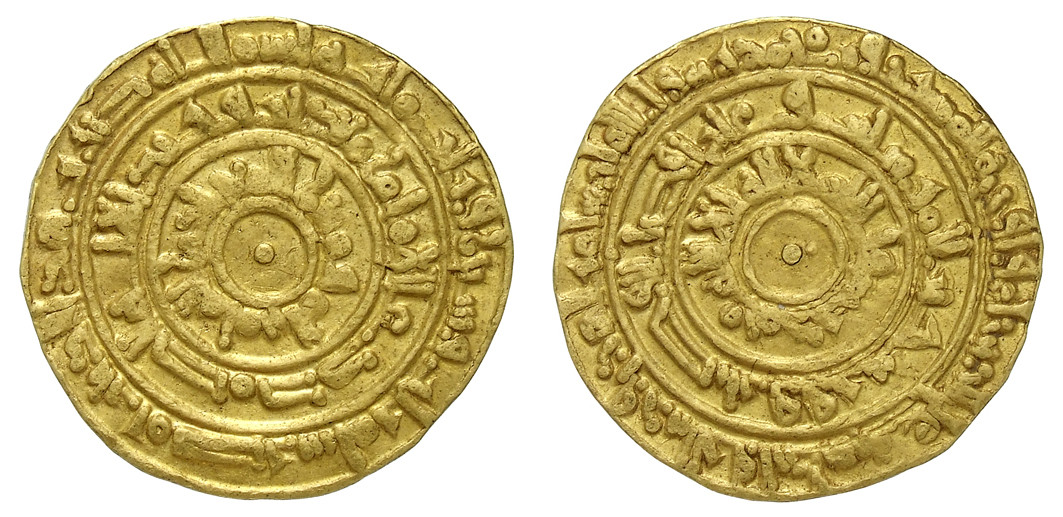
Gold dinar of al-Mu'izz, minted at Cairo in 973 or 974.

Al-Mansur's son, al-Mu'izz (r. 953–975), further changed the design of the coins: the horizontal field was removed altogether, and the coins featured thee concentric circles around a central point. The historian Irene Bierman interprets this design as an Isma'ili motif symbolizing the centrality of the Fatimid imam–caliph, drawing on the frequent use of circles as metaphors in Isma'ili doctrine, and the circular city of Mansuriya that al-Mansur had erected, where the caliphal palace was located in its centre. Others, like Jonathan Bloom, warn on the other hand that "no sources provide the slightest hint about what significance, if any, these changes were meant to have". While their number varied, and the dot was sometimes removed in favour of a central, horizontally inscribed field, the three concentric circles on obverse and reverse remained as the standard pattern for subsequent Fatimid dinars until the end of the dynasty.

Unlike his predecessors, al-Mu'izz introduced explicitly Shi'a formulas proclaiming Isma'ili doctrine: the obverse side included praise to Ali as "heir (wasi) of the Prophet and the most excellent deputy and husband of the Radiant Pure One (i.e. Fatima)", while the reverse declared al-Mu'izz's and his ancestors' claims to the imamate as the "Revifier of the Sunna of Muhammad, the lord of those sent [by God], and the inheritor of the glory of the Rightly Guiding Imams". The deliberately polemic formula about Ali was dropped in AH 343 (954/5 CE), for reasons that are as unclear as to why it was introduced in the first place—possibly the highly inflammatory formula caused problems with the Sunni majority of the Fatimid subjects—and replaced with the more moderate "Ali is the most excellent of the heirs and is the deputy (wazir) of the best of those sent [by God]".

=== Later developments ===
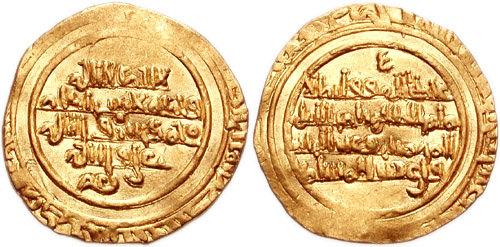
Gold dinar struck in 1021, with the names of Caliph al-Hakim and the designated heir Abd al-Rahim ibn Ilyas.

Under al-Aziz (r. 975–996), the formula "The Servant of God and His Companion [i.e., Ali]" was added before the name of the reigning caliph. Unlike Abbasid practice, where coins often included the names of designated heirs or viziers, or other potentates, the Fatimid coins never did so, with the exception of al-Hakim (r. 996–1021) who added the name of his designated successor (wali ahd al-muslimin) as caliph, Abd al-Rahim ibn Ilyas, to the coins. Al-Hakim also departed from the Mu'izzi dinar's design by replacing the central dot with a legend bearing the name of God, Allah.

In 1130, the title of wali ahd al-muslimin was put on the coins by Abd al-Majid during his regency after the murder of his cousin, al-Amir (r. 1101–1130), before he assumed the caliphate himself as al-Hafiz in 1132. Before that, however, his regency was interrupted by the brief regime of Kutayfat, who abolished the Fatimid dynasty altogether and instead put on his coins a mysterious "Abu'l-Qasim, the Expected One on God's command (al-Muntazar li-Amr Allah), Commander of the Faithful" or "the Rightly-Guided Imam, who executes God's will, Proof of God". This "Expected Imam" remained unnamed, and may have been the infant al-Tayyib or an anticipated posthumous son of al-Amir's, but is commonly held to have been the final Twelver Shi'a imam, Muhammad al-Mahdi. This is far from certain, as the ambiguity suited Kutayfat's purposes: in the absence of the nebulous Imam, he was free to rule as a divinely authorized vice-gerent.

== Dinars ==
The stability of the gold coinage was important, both for commercial reasons as well as for symbolic ones, being a hallmark of stable government, a prosperous state, as well as being a vehicle for Fatimid political and religious propaganda. The distribution of newly minted gold and silver coins to officials was a central part of New Year ceremonies at the Fatimid court, and gold dinars especially were a statement of prestige and legitimacy for a dynasty; when the Umayyads of al-Andalus declared the Caliphate of Cordoba in 929 in direct opposition to Fatimid pretensions, the first symbolic act to underscore their new claims was the minting of gold dinars. According to the historian Michael Brett, the high-quality and overtly Shi'a dinars issued by al-Mu'izz were "proof of his mission...[h]is ideological purpose created a demand which elicited a supply". In their pursuit of pure gold coinage, the Fatimids profited from the role of Ifriqiya as the outlet of trans-Saharan trade networks, not only in terms of tax revenue, but particularly as a terminus for the gold trade from West Africa and Sub-Saharan Africa, which supplied the Fatimid mint with large amounts of high-quality metal. According to one estimate, about two tons of gold were imported from south of the Sahara into the Maghreb every year, half of which went to the Fatimid mints. In Egypt, the Fatimids had access to gold mines in Upper Egypt, as well as loot from the tombs of the pharaohs.

The high quality of Fatimid coinage was deliberately used as a political tool by al-Mu'izz: during the Fatimid conquest of Egypt in 969, one of the core promises of the Fatimid general Jawhar to the inhabitants of Fustat was the restoration of the quality of the coinage, and even before the conquest itself, Fatimid dinars bearing the mint mark Misr (Egypt) are known to have circulated in the country, likely as means of propaganda or psychological warfare. In fulfillment of his promise, Jawhar had brought equipment for a new mint with him, and began to mint extremely high-quality coins; they were popularly called "red" (al-hamra) dinars due to their high purity, in contrast to the "white" (al-abyad) alloyed dinars then in circulation. The measure initially backfired, as the Egyptians hoarded these coins and continued to use the debased Abbasid currency instead. Jawhar's attempts to regulate the conversion rate between the new Fatimid dinars and the old, debased, Abbasid coinage caused widespread resentment when he set the Abbasid dinar at an artificially low conversion rate to drive it out of circulation. The issue remained unresolved until al-Mu'izz arrived in Egypt in 973 with large quantities of gold bullion—one hundred camel-loads of millstone-shaped gold bars—only then did the Fatimid dinars prevail in the Egyptian market. The Mu'izzi dinars enjoyed such a good reputation that under al-Mustansir (r. 1036–1094), who had the same name as al-Mu'izz, virtually identical coins were minted between 1048/9 and 1080/1, most likely in order to borrow the earlier coins' prestige.

Despite the severe crises of the late 11th and 12th centuries, the fineness of Fatimid gold coinage is generally reported to have remained exceptionally high throughout most of their history. This high standard of fineness is corroborated by some modern studies but disputed by others. In the Fatimid domains in the Levant, the full dinar was often of less weight than its Egyptian counterpart. Caliph al-Amir launched an investigation into the operation of his mints, resulting in the subsequent increase of the standard of the Fatimid dinars, which often reached 100% purity. The very quality of Fatimid dinars made it a ready target for imitation by the Crusader states installed in the Levant during the turn of the 12th century. These "Saracen bezants" were mostly imitations of the coins of al-Mustansir and al-Amir. In the words of the historian Paula Sanders, "these substandard dinars flooded the Mediterranean, causing a loss of confidence in the Fatimid currency". Only during the last decades of the Fatimid regime, with gold sources in Egypt itself drying up, did the Fatimids mint debased gold coinage.

== Dirhams ==
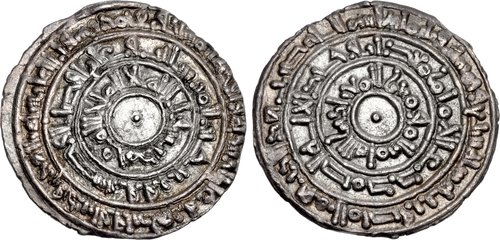
Silver half-dirham of al-Mu'izz, struck at Mansuriya in 967 or 968.

The dirham was the main silver coin, which was evaluated in relation to the gold dinar and whose intrinsic measurements are generally left unmentioned in historical sources. The z'aida and qat'a silver coins also appear in historical sources, but their appearance or exact nature is left unclear. Both debased/alloyed (waraq) and pure (nuqra) silver coins were minted. A few local issues in Palestine are billon but were likely categorized as dirhams; likewise, the few copper or bronze pieces known likely represented factions of dirhams, rather than being enumerated as the usual Islamic copper coinage, fulus, a theory supported by traces of silver wash in some of them.

Although the number of surviving specimens is small and may not be representative, it appears that Fatimid full and half-dirhams were about 10% lighter than was the theoretical norm in the Islamic world, while quarter-dirhams corresponded to the theoretical weight. Medieval historians give the initial value of the Mu'izzi dinar cut in 973 as 19.5 dirhams. In the 1000s under al-Hakim, debased dirhams of two-thirds silver and one-third copper came into circulation, so that in 1006/7 26 dihrams corresponded to a dinar, and soon their value dropped even further, one dinar to 34 dirhams. The monetary crisis was only rectified when full-value dirhams were brought into circulation in 1008/9 and replaced the old ones to a rate of one to four, restoring the exchange rate to 18 dirhams to one dinar. The value of the dirham remained steady thereafter and rose to 16 to the dinar in 1044/5, despite the fact that silver content had dropped to 50% under al-Zahir (r. 1021–1036) and al-Mustansir, but five years later a new even more debased dirham with just one-third silver content came into circulation, which collapsed its valuation to 35 to the dinar.

By the time of the last Fatimid caliph, al-Adid (r. 1160–1171), the silver content of the dirham was 25%–30%, a testament to the silver shortage afflicting the state at the time. These dirhams were small, irregularly shaped, and almost black in color, a type of coin that was continued by the subsequent Ayyubid Sultanate until 1187/8.

== Mints and their administration ==
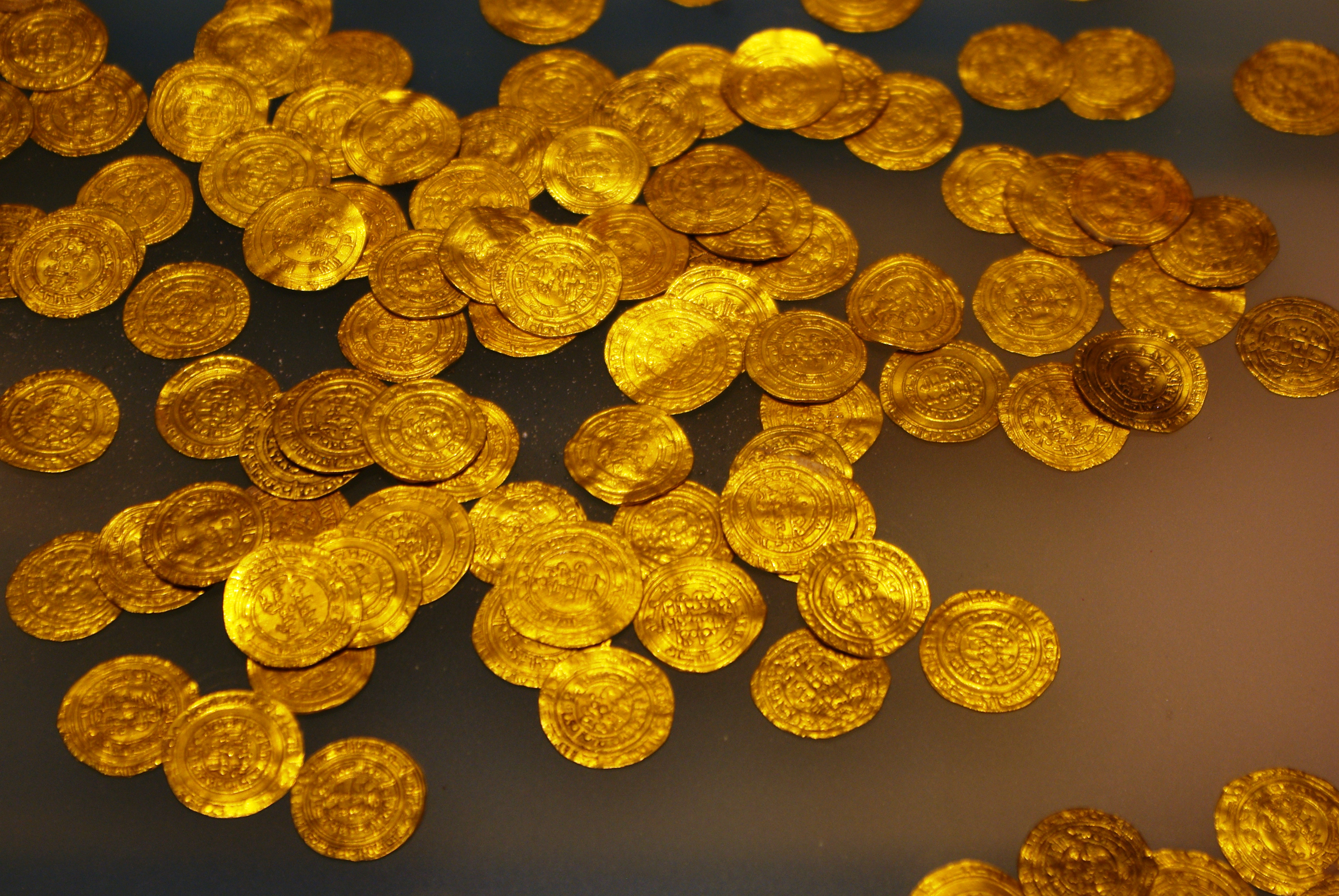
The Caesarea hoard, comprising some 2,000 Fatimid dinars from the 11th century

Fatimid coins were issued in the Fatimid capitals—Kairouan, Mahdia and its suburb Zawila, Mansuriya (also called Sabra), and finally Cairo–Fustat—but also several provincial or vassal state mints:

- In the Maghreb: Ceuta, Fez, Muhammadiya, Sijilmasa, Tripoli in Libya and Barqa (or Antablus).
- In Sicily: Agrigento, Palermo (provincial capital and chief mint), Messina, Syracuse and Taormina (called al-Mu'izziya).
- In Egypt: Alexandria and Qus.
- In the Levant: Acre, Ascalon, Ayla, Aleppo, Damascus, Tyre, Tiberias, Tripoli in Lebanon, Ramla (provincial capital and chief mint for Palestine), al-Rahba, Raqqah
- In the Hejaz: Mecca and Medina
- In Yemen: Aden, Aththar, Ibb, Jaththah, al-Jannah (not localized), al-Nuqr (not localized), Saada, Sanaa and Zabid
- In Iraq: Baghdad and Kufa

Provincial mints were liable to introduce their own designs or variations; in Sicily, there were apparently several workshops with different dies that produced several different types even in a single year.

Under the Fatimids, the responsibility of the mint had been assigned to the chief qadi. In Cairo, the original mint was located in the southern part of the Fatimid Great Palaces. In 1122, al-Amir's vizier, al-Ma'mun al-Bata'ihi, built a new mint (dar al-darb) in Cairo near the al-Azhar Mosque. This reform also included the institution of a new official, the musharif dar al-darb, who took over the management of the mint.

== Sources ==
- Balog, Paul (1961). "History of the Dirhem in Egypt from the Fāṭimid Conquest until the collapse of the Mamlūk Empire". Revue numismatique. 6. 6 (3): 109–146. doi:10.3406/numi.1961.1704.
- Bierman, Irene A. (1998). Writing Signs: The Fatimid Public Text. Berkeley: University of California Press. ISBN 978-0-520-20802-5.
- Bloom, Jonathan M. (2007). Arts of the City Victorious: Islamic Art and Architecture in Fatimid North Africa and Egypt. New Haven and London: Yale University Press. ISBN 978-0-300-13542-8.
- Brett, Michael (2001). The Rise of the Fatimids: The World of the Mediterranean and the Middle East in the Fourth Century of the Hijra, Tenth Century CE. The Medieval Mediterranean. Vol. 30. Leiden, Boston, Köln: Brill. ISBN 90-04-11741-5.
- Brett, Michael (2017). The Fatimid Empire. The Edinburgh History of the Islamic Empires. Edinburgh: Edinburgh University Press. ISBN 978-0-7486-4076-8.
- Canard, Marius (1965). "Fāṭimids". In Lewis, B.; Pellat, Ch. & Schacht, J. (eds.). The Encyclopaedia of Islam, Second Edition. Volume II: C–G. Leiden: E. J. Brill. pp. 850–862. OCLC 495469475.
- Daftary, Farhad (2007). The Ismāʿı̄lı̄s: Their History and Doctrines (Second ed.). Cambridge: Cambridge University Press. ISBN 978-0-521-61636-2.
- Darley-Doran, R. E. (1997). "Sikka 2. Coinage practice". In Bosworth, C. E.; van Donzel, E.; Heinrichs, W. P. & Lecomte, G. (eds.). The Encyclopaedia of Islam, Second Edition. Volume IX: San–Sze. Leiden: E. J. Brill. pp. 592–599. ISBN 978-90-04-10422-8.
- Ehrenkreutz, Andrew S. (1956). "The Crisis of Dīnār in the Egypt of Saladin". Journal of the American Oriental Society. 76 (3): 178–184. doi:10.2307/596289. JSTOR 596289.
- Ehrenkreutz, Andrew S. (1959). "Studies in the Monetary History of the Near East in the Middle Ages: The Standard of Fineness of Some Types of Dinars". Journal of the Economic and Social History of the Orient. 2 (2): 128–161. doi:10.2307/3596018. JSTOR 3596018.
- Ehrenkreutz, Andrew S. (1963). "Studies in the Monetary History of the Near East in the Middle Ages II: The Standard of Fineness of Western and Eastern Dīnārs before the Crusades". Journal of the Economic and Social History of the Orient. 6 (3): 243–277. doi:10.2307/3596267. JSTOR 3596267.
- Ehrenkreutz, Andrew S.; Heck, Gene W. (1986). "Additional Evidence of the Fāṭimid Use of Dīnārs for Propaganda Purposes". In Sharon, Moshe (ed.). Studies in Islamic History and Civilisation in honour of Professor David Ayalon. Jerusalem: Cana Ltd. pp. 145–152. ISBN 965-264-014-X.
- Halm, Heinz (1991). Das Reich des Mahdi: Der Aufstieg der Fatimiden [The Empire of the Mahdi: The Rise of the Fatimids] (in German). Munich: C. H. Beck. ISBN 978-3-406-35497-7.
- Halm, Heinz (2003). Die Kalifen von Kairo: Die Fatimiden in Ägypten, 973–1074 [The Caliphs of Cairo: The Fatimids in Egypt, 973–1074] (in German). Munich: C. H. Beck. ISBN 3-406-48654-1.
- Halm, Heinz (2014). Kalifen und Assassinen: Ägypten und der vordere Orient zur Zeit der ersten Kreuzzüge, 1074–1171 [Caliphs and Assassins: Egypt and the Near East at the Time of the First Crusades, 1074–1171] (in German). Munich: C. H. Beck. doi:10.17104/9783406661648-1. ISBN 978-3-406-66163-1.
- Lewis, Bernard (2004). From Babel to Dragomans: Interpreting the Middle East. Oxford and New York: Oxford University Press. ISBN 0-19-517336-8.
- Miles, G. C. (1965). "Dīnār". In Lewis, B.; Pellat, Ch. & Schacht, J. (eds.). The Encyclopaedia of Islam, Second Edition. Volume II: C–G. Leiden: E. J. Brill. pp. 297–299. OCLC 495469475.
- Nicol, Norman D. (2006). A Corpus of Fāṭimid Coins. Trieste: Giulio Bernardi. ISBN 978-88-8587330-8.
- Oddy, W. A. (1980). "The gold contents of Fatimid coins reconsidered". In Metcalf, D. M.; Oddy, W. A. (eds.). Metallurgy in Numismatics, Volume 1. London: Royal Numismatic Society. pp. 99–118. ISBN 0-901405-14-0.
- Sanders, Paula (1994). Ritual, Politics, and the City in Fatimid Cairo. Albany, new York: State University of New York Press. ISBN 0-7914-1781-6.
- Walker, Paul E. (2002). Exploring an Islamic Empire: Fatimid History and its Sources. London and New York: I.B.Tauris. ISBN 186064-692-1.
