= Modern gold dinar =

Proposed currency that aims to revive the gold dinar of the medieval Umayyad Caliphate

The modern gold dinar (sometimes referred as Islamic dinar or Gold dinar) is a proposed bullion gold coin, so far not issued as official currency by any national state. It aims to revive the historical gold dinar, which was a leading coin of early Islam. Advocates have suggested it could consist of minted gold coins (dinars) or of silver coins (dirhams).

== Dinar history ==
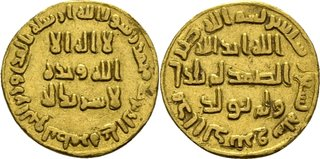
Gold dinar of Abd al-Malik, AH 75, Umayyad Caliphate.

According to Islamic law, the Islamic dinar is a coin of pure gold weighing 72 grains of average barley. Modern determinations of weight for the "full solidus" weigh 4.44 grams at the time of Heraclius and a "light solidus" equivalent to the weight of the mithqal weighing 4.25 grams, with the silver Dirham being created to the weight ratio of 7:10, yielded coins of 2.975 grams of pure silver.

Umar Ibn al-Khattab established the known standard relationship between them based on their weights: 7 dinars must be equivalent (in weight) to 10 dirhams.

The Revelation undertook to mention them and attached many judgements to them, for example zakat, marriage, and hudud, etc., therefore within the Revelation they have to have a reality and specific measure for assessment of zakat, etc. upon which its judgements may be based rather than on the non-shari'i other coins.

Know that there is consensus since the beginning of Islam and the age of the Companions and the Followers that the dirham of the shari'ah is that of which ten weigh seven Mithqals weight of the dinar of gold... The weight of a Mithqal of gold is seventy-two grains of barley, so that the dirham which is seven-tenths of it is fifty and two-fifths grains. All these measurements are firmly established by consensus.

== Value and denomination ==
Per the historical law stated above, one dinar is 4.25 grams of pure gold, and a smaller denomination, the daniq, one sixth of that. Again from the law above, the dirham is 2.975 grams of pure silver. The value of each coin is according to their weight and the market value of the two metals. Coins may be minted at fractions or multiples of these weights and valued accordingly.

In practice coins were historically minted in either 24 karat "pure gold" although some contemporary coins have been minted in 22k for greater durability. In either case the weight of the gold content will be as per law.

== Adoption ==
=== Indonesia ===
In Indonesia, while there is no official national coin, a number of mints are producing their own gold dinars, including that launched in 2000 by the Islamic Mint Nusantara (IMN). and Logam Mulia.

=== Malaysia ===
In 2002, the prime minister of Malaysia proposed a gold dinar standard for use in the Islamic world.

Kelantan was the first state in the country to introduce the dinar in 2006, which was locally minted. In 2010, it issued new coins, including the dirham, minted in the United Arab Emirates by the World Islamic Mint. The state of Perak followed suit, minting its own dinar and dirham, which was launched in 2011.

=== Islamic State ===
Gold dinar
دينار ذهبي (Arabic)

Denominations
- Coins: 1, 5 dinars 1, 2, 5 dirhams 5, 10, 25 fulûs

Demographics
- User(s): Islamic State

Issuance
- Central bank: Diwan Bayt al-Mal (Islamic State Treasury Department)

The leader of the UN-designated terrorist group Islamic State, Abu Bakr al-Baghdadi, announced in November 2014 that the Caliphate intended to mint its own gold, silver and copper coins in order to free the Muslims from the financial order that has "enslaved and impoverished" them. The currency would be based on the dinar coins minted by the Caliphate of Uthman ibn Affan and include seven coins: two gold, three silver and two copper, ranging in value from 7¢ to $694, their values based on the intrinsic value of the metals. The gold dinar is weighted at 4.25 grams and is made of 21 karat gold.

Despite a propaganda push for the currency, adoption appeared to have been minimal and its internal economy is effectively dollarized, even with regards to its own fines.

=== Other groups ===
Abdalqadir as-Sufi, founder of the Murabitun World Movement, was once a strong proponent of the idea for the gold dinar revival movement, but in February 2014 he completely distanced himself from it, saying, "So, I now dis-associate myself from all activity involving the Islamic gold dinar and silver dirham". Trinidadian scholar Imran Nazar Hosein has also been promoting the revival of Dinar usage, but has linked its use to Islamic eschatology.

== Use ==
Most of the coins are issued privately and are not legal tender. In Malaysia, the state government of Kelantan allows their use in transactions while it is illegal according to federal law.

Common uses of the gold dinar include:

1. Buying merchandise from outlets.
2. Holding accounts, and making and receiving payments as with any other medium of exchange.
3. Saving, as is done with any form of gold.
4. Paying zakat and mahr as established within Islamic law.

== See also ==
- Fals
- Islamic banking
