= Pūl (coin) =

Coin

Pūl (Russian: пул, Tatar: پول) was a historical currency that circulated in Russian Turkestan. Pūls were used in Golden Horde, Afghanistan, Bukhara, Chagatai Khanate, Kokand Khanate, Dzungar Khanate, and other Eurasian principalities, it was a copper coin of very small denomination, 1/60 of an altyn.

== Etymology ==
From Middle Persian *pōl, Borrowing from Ancient Greek ὀβολός (obolós).

== In the Golden Horde ==
In the Golden Horde pūl coins were officially set to a rate of 16 pūls per dannik as was escribed on many pūl coins, and were often struck by banks at the request of private customers who exchanged their raw copper for coins. The Khans, and their financial advisors often manipulated the market value of pūls by issuing new coins with the inscription “a new pūl” while declaring all other pūls in circulation to no longer be valid media of exchange, and the population was forced to exchange their old pūl coins for new ones. Generally speaking the newer pūl coins tended to be heavier, though their weights weren't standard. Officially they remained set at 16 pūls per dannik however this was purely symbolic and many local government issued their own exchange rates.

== Dzungar pūls under Manchu rule ==
After the Manchu conquest of the Dzungar Khanate pūl coins were offered by the Qing government to be exchanged for ”Red Cash” at a ratio of 2 pūl for 1 cash, but after 1762 the exchange was altered to 1:1. Under the Qing dynasty pūl coins continued to be produced until 1745, and the Manchus stopped pulling them out of circulation to cast “Red Cash” in 1768. Small amounts of pūl coins returned to the market during the Dungan Revolt (1862–77).

=== Pūl coins of Yaqub Beg ===
The Tajik Dungan leader Yaqub Beg first issued pūl coins with the name of the late Kokandi leader Malla Khan (1858–1862), and despite being minted in Kashgar, Xinjiang they bore the inscription “Struck in the Mint of Kokand”, however from 1873 new coins produced under Yaqub Beg bearing the name of Abdülaziz, Sultan of the Ottoman Empire, and this time these pūls did bear the inscription "Struck in the Mint of Kashgar, the Capital".

== Pūl coins in the Kokand Khanate ==
The monetary system of the Khanate of Kokand was dependent on the influx of foreign coins into its territory, particularly coins from Bukhara. However under the reign of Narbuta Beg monetary reforms were enacted to produce local coinage, pūl (or ful) coins which were referred to as “black money”, and at the time of their introduction a single pūl could buy a sheep. The mint of the khanate had a capacity to produce 1000 coins on a daily basis.

The exchange between copper, silver, and gold coinages as well as the purchasing power of Kokandi pūls often changed, Kokandi pūls generally weighed 1 mithqāl (4.55 g), in the 1850s 6 pūls were needed for 1 Miri, and 24 pūls for a silver coin. Silver coins minted by Mingbashi Musulmonqul were valued at 24–32 pūls, this the 1870s this fluctuated between 42 and 64 pūls with the highest exchange rate being at 100 pūls. Generally 3 Kokandi pūls were valued at 1 Russian silver kopek, and Kokandi pūls also circulated in the Khanate of Khiva, the Emirate of Bukhara, and the Chinese city of Kashgar.

== Pūl coins of Tashkent ==
In 1784 Tashkent became independent from the Kazakh Khanate, this was briefly followed by the concurrent rule of 4 ḥākims (circuit justice administrators), the ḥākim Shaykhantaur took control from the others and proclaimed himself as the only ruler of Tashkent. As the title of ḥākim was elected this period in Tashkent's history is sometimes referred to as the “Republic of Tashkent”, during this era Tashkent issued its own copper pūl (or Fulūs), and silver tanga coins.

Pūl coins produced in Tashkent generally had 2 sizes with the lower denomination pūl being between 14 and 17 millimetres (0.55–0.67 in) in diameter, while those of higher value would be 20–24 mm (0.79–0.94 in). The coins often contained the mint mark of Tashkent in Persian as “Coinage of Tashkent” (Persian: ضرب تاشكند), and had a Persian blessing inscribed on them reading “May the future life be good” (Persian: عاقبت خير باد). The obverse of Tashkent's pūls often would not bear any mint marks but various images like cats, birds, fish, or mythological creatures. These coins continued to be produced until Tashkent was annexed by the Khanate of Kokand in 1809.

== See also ==
- Afghan afghani
- Dirham
- Yuan dynasty coinage
- Manghir

== Literature ==
- Uzdennikov V. Coins of Russia (1700—1917): Third edition. Moscow, Collector's Books; IP Media Inc., 2004 (Узденников В. Монеты России (1700—1917): Издание третье. — М.: Collector's Books; IP Media Inc., 2004).
- Album, S. 1998. A Checklist of Islamic Coins, 2nd ed.
- Bosworth, C. E. 1996. The New Islamic Dynasties. New York: Columbia University Press.
- Bregel, Y. 1988. S.v. “Mangit/Mangits” in Encyclopaedia of Islam, new ed., 6: 417–419.
- Burnasheva, R. 1967. Monety Bukharskogo Khanstva pri Mangytakh: Epigrafika Vostoka, 18: 113–128. 4 plates, 3 tables. (Shah Murad, Haydar Tora, and Husayn).
- Burnasheva, R. 1972. Monety Bukharskogo Khanstva pri Mangytakh: Epigrafika Vostoka, 21:69-80. 4 tables (Nasr Allah, Muzaffar, ʿAbd al-Ahad, and ʿAlim Khan).
- Davidovich, E. A. 1964. Istoriia Monetnogo Dela Srednei Azii XVII-XVIII vv. [Gold and Silver of the Janids]. Dushanbe.
- Fedorov, M. 2002. “Money circulation under the Janids and Manghits of Bukhara, and the Khans of Khoqand and Khiva.” Supplement to ONS Newsletter 171.
- Kennedy, H., ed. 2002. An Historical Atlas of Islam. Brill.
- Krause, C. L., and C. Mishler. 2002. Standard Catalog of World Coins, 1701–1800, 3rd ed.
- Krause, C. L., and C. Mishler. 2004. Standard Catalog of World Coins, 1801–1900, 4th ed.
- Krause, C. L., and C. Mishler. 2005. Standard Catalog of World Coins, 32nd ed.
- Lane-Poole, S. 1882. The Coinage of Bukhara in the British Museum: The Mangit Dynasty, 74–85. (No AE coins listed).
- Torrey, C. C. 1950. “Gold coins of Khokand and Bukhara.” Numismatic Notes and Monographs 117.
