= Manghir =

Ottoman copper coin

منغر (Ottoman Turkish)
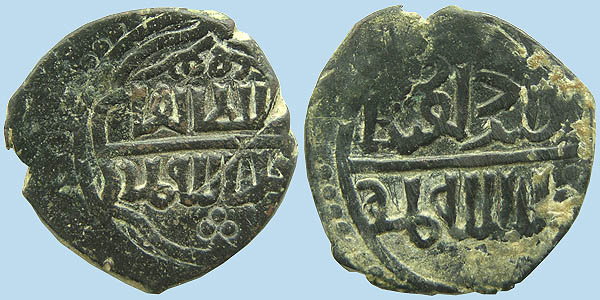
- A manghir of Murad I

Unit
- Unit: Dirhem
- Nickname: Pul

Denominations
- Subunit
- 1/4: Quarter dirhem
- 1/3: One third dirhem
- 1/2: Half dirhem
- 1/1: Whole dirhem

Demographics
- Date of introduction: 14th century
- Date of withdrawal: 1879
- User(s): Ottoman Empire
- This infobox shows the latest status before this currency was rendered obsolete.

The manghir (pl. manghirs; Ottoman Turkish: منغر; Turkish: mangır) was an Ottoman copper coin introduced first during the reign of sultan Murad I (r. 1360–1389).

== Etymology ==
The word manghir comes from the Mongolian word mungun/mongon (see wikt:мөнгө), meaning "cash". It is also written as mangur, mankur and mankır. In the Ottoman realm, it was called "red manghir" due to its color, and in the common tongue it was also called pul. In the Islamic world, manghir is mostly used for Ottoman copper coins.

== History ==
=== Attestation ===
It is not known when the first manghirs were minted in the Ottoman Empire. Although it is claimed that the first copper coin was minted during the time of Orhan, the first Ottoman copper coins that have survived to the present day belong to Murad I. The first copper coin with a tughra was minted by Süleyman Çelebi (r. 1402–1410).

=== Value ===
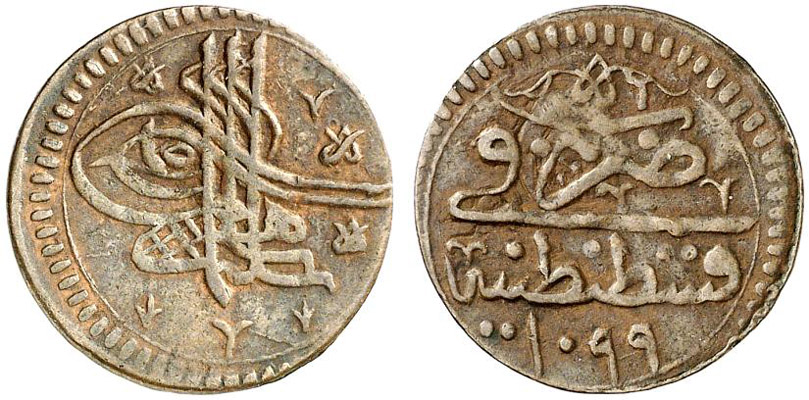
A manghir of Suleiman II, struck in Ḳosṭanṭīnīye (Constantinople), 1688 AD

During the period from Murad II to Suleiman II, manghirs were minted as 1, 1/2 or 1/4 dirhem (1 dirhem is equal to 3.2 g) and they were called "whole manghir", "half manghir" and "quarter manghir". During the reign of Mehmed II, eight whole manghirs were euqal to 1 akçe. Small manghirs weighed 1/3 of a dirhem and twenty-four of them were worth 1 akçe.

=== Peak of circulation ===
The most copper coins were minted and distributed during the reign of Suleiman the Magnificent. The 15th and 16th centuries constitute the period when copper coin use was highest.

Due to the abundant and cheap silver coming to the Ottoman realm from South America, copper coin minting decreased starting from the reign of Murad III.

Mostly in Istanbul, there was a significant decline in the minting of copper coins from the beginning of the 17th century until the Tanzimat. In fact, the circulation of copper coins had stopped in the middle of the 17th century.

=== Reintroduction and loss of reputation ===
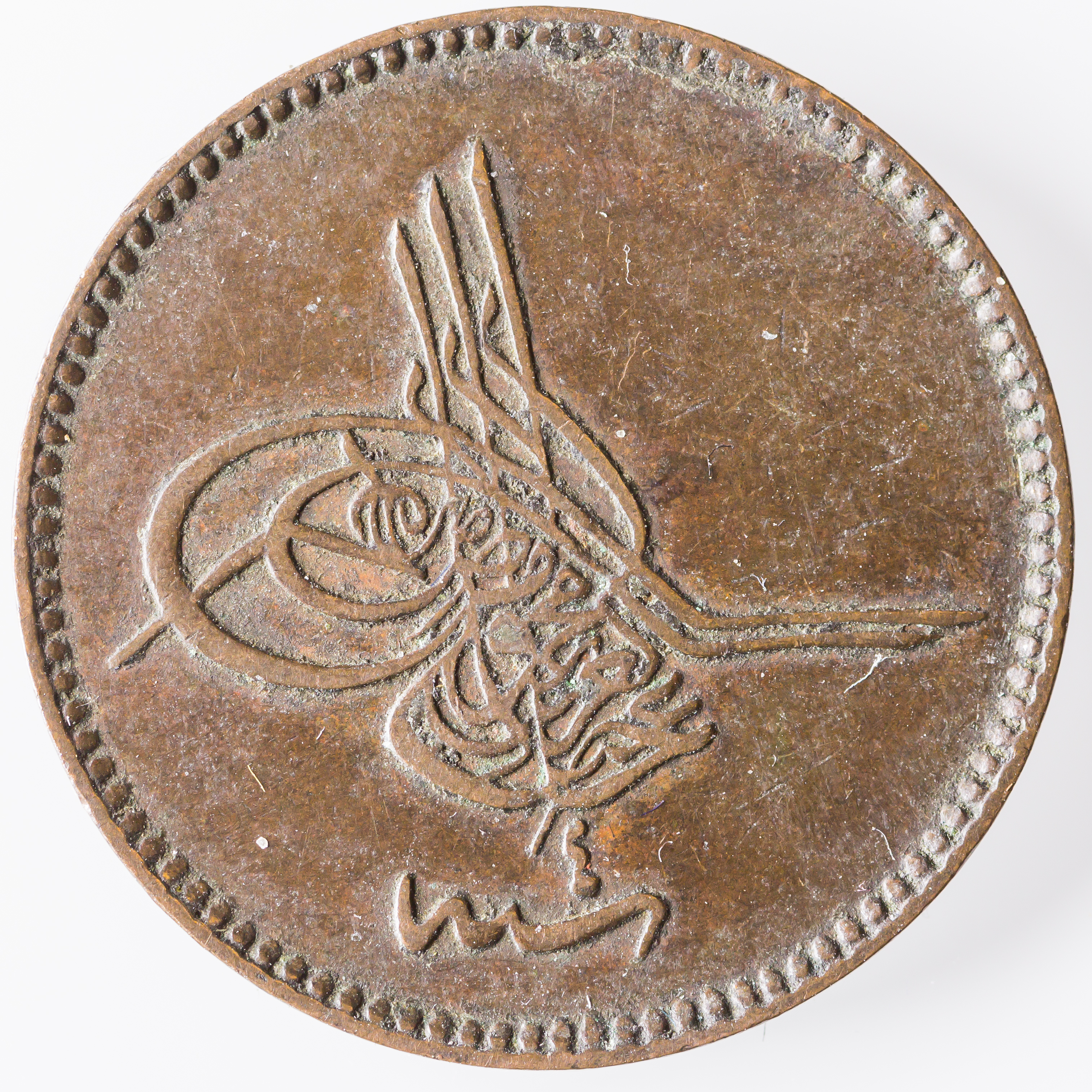
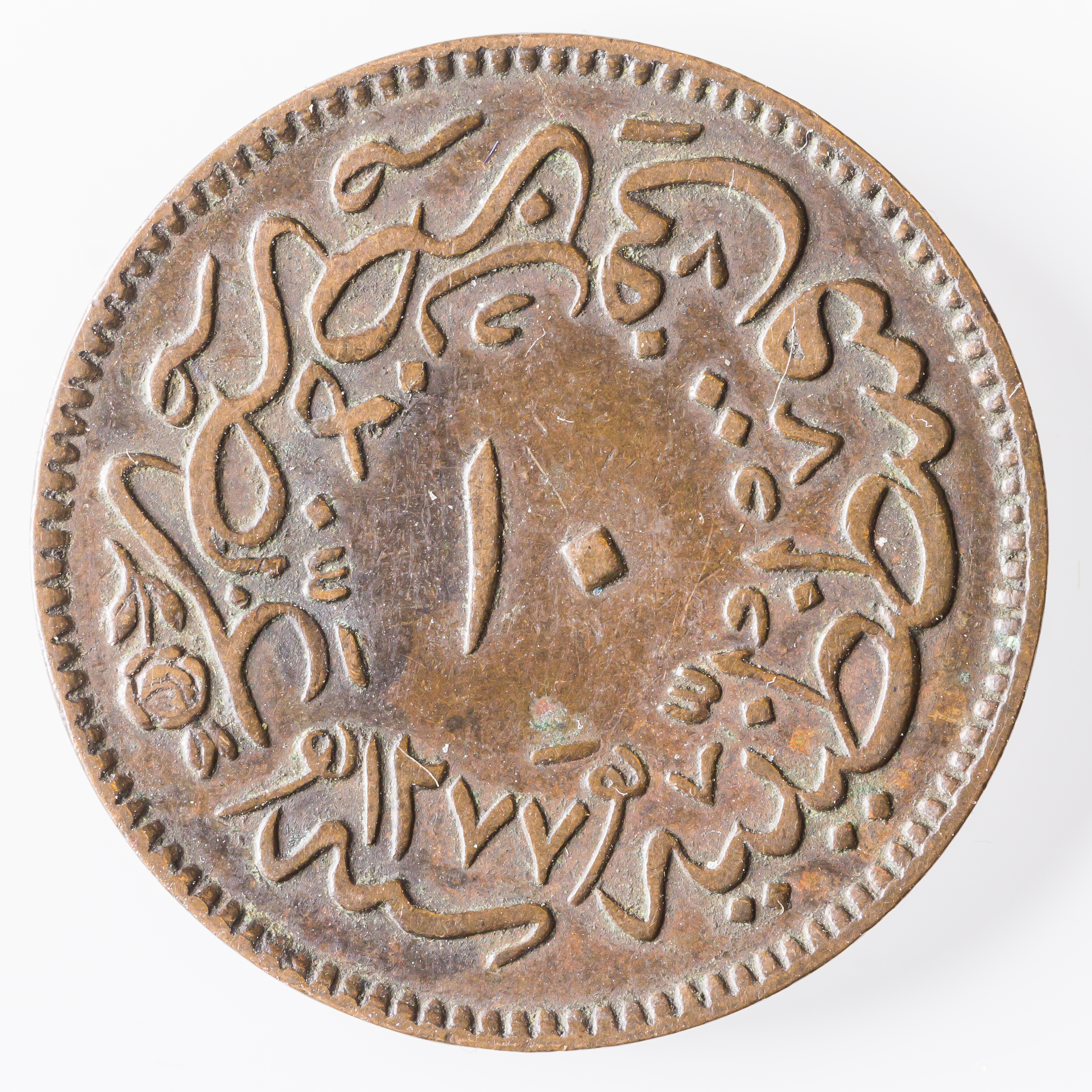
10 para of Abdulaziz, struck in Ḳosṭanṭīnīye (Constantinople), 1277 AD (4th issue year)

As a result of the Battle of Vienna, a crisis occurred in state finances and a mint was established in Tavşantaşı, Istanbul. The first coins were minted on 12 September 1688. The aim was to provide new financing opportunities with new coins to be minted and to overcome the crisis. Copper was supplied from the Gümüşhane and Küre, Kastamonu mines. 2 copper coins were equal to 1 akçe, the diameter of which was 19 mm and the weight was 1/2 dirham (1.60 g). The state made a great profit from minting coins during this period. When these coins became popular, their value was increased and provisions were enacted to equal 1 coin to 1 akçe. This led to counterfeiting, which caused distrust and loss of reputation and caused the coin minting to be stopped in the autumn of 1691.

In a decree of 1839, copper coins of 40, 20, 10, 5 and 1 para were minted. Manghirs were last minted during the reign of Abdulhamid II and were withdrawn from circulation with a decree in 1879.

=== Economic benefits to the state ===
The manghir was a money with a nominal value. There was a big difference between its real value and the nominal value that the state assigned to it. This difference was stipulated by the state itself. The common people were forced to buy a certain amount of copper coins in exchange for silver coins, which was considered a kind of tax practice, but this was also necessary to meet the people's need for change.

== Mint locations ==
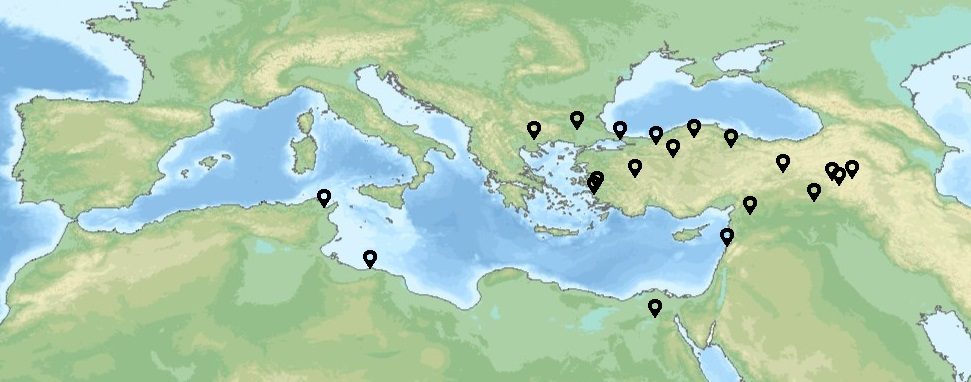
Locations where manghirs were minted

Outside of Constantinople, the coins were minted in Edirne, Bursa, Amasya, Ayasuluk, Ankara, Bolu, Tire, Kastamonu, Karahisar, Harput, Mardin, Aleppo, Serres, Van, Tripoli (east), Tripoli (west), Egypt, Bitlis, Tunis and Hizan.
