= Gold dinar =

Type of coin

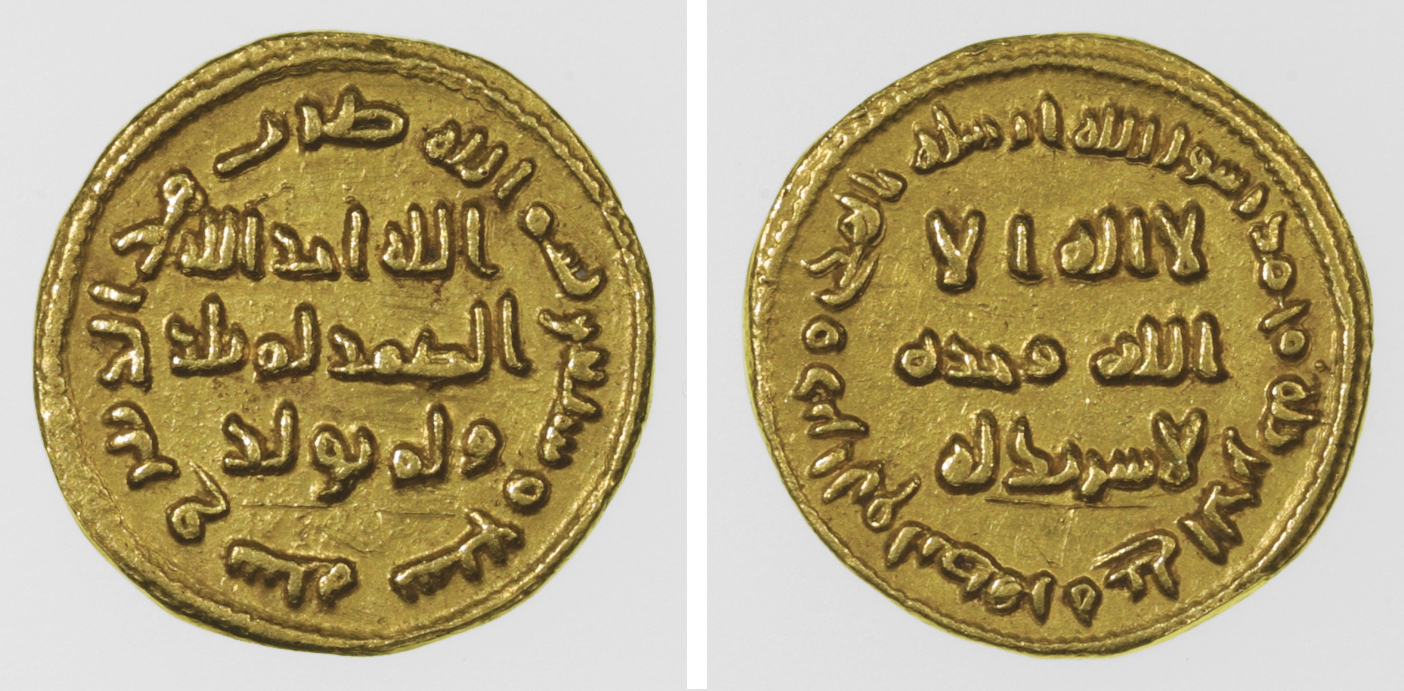
Umayyad gold dinar minted at Damascus, Syria in AH 77 (697 CE) having a weight of 4.24 grams

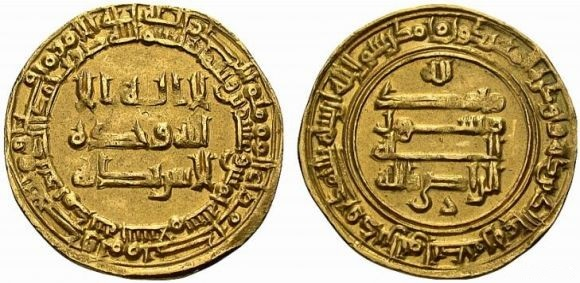
Gold Dinar of the 20th Abbasid Caliph Ar-Radi bi'llah (934–940 CE)

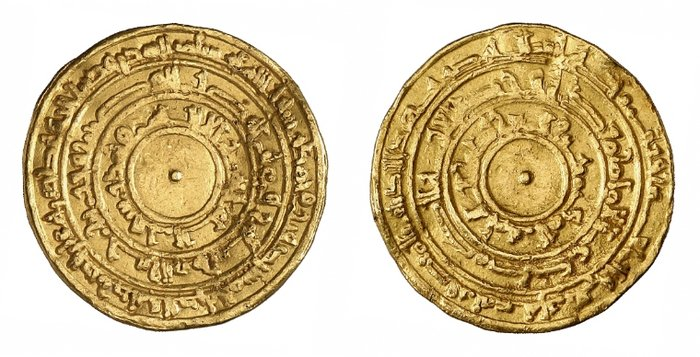
Fatimid dinar issued during the reign of al-Mu'izz li-Din Allah in Mansuriya in 344 AH (955 CE)

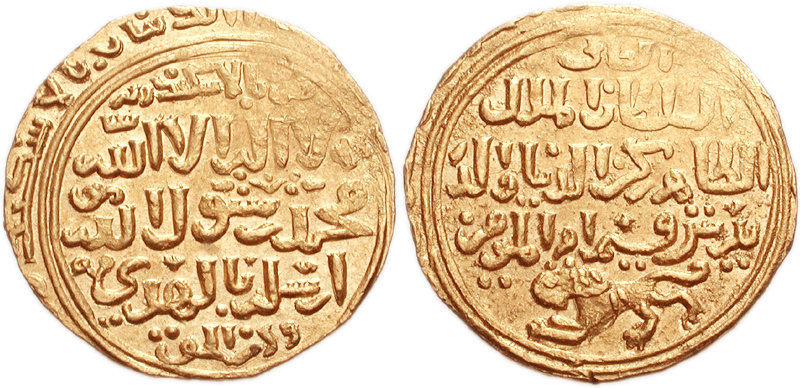
Dinar Mamluq sultan Baybars (658–676 AH (1260–1277 CE)

The gold dinar (Arabic: ﺩﻳﻨﺎﺭ ذهب) is an Islamic medieval gold coin first issued in AH 77 (696–697 CE) by Caliph Abd al-Malik ibn Marwan. The weight of the dinar is 1 mithqal (4.25 grams or 0.137 troy ounces).

The word dinar comes from the Latin word denarius, which was a silver coin. The name "dinar" is also used for Sasanid, Kushan, and Kidarite gold coins, though it is not known what the contemporary name was.

The first dinars were issued by the Umayyad Caliphate. Under the dynasties that followed the use of the dinar spread from Islamic Spain to Central Asia.

== Background ==
Although there was a dictum that the Byzantine solidus was not to be used outside of the Byzantine Empire, some of these coins became involved in distant trade; those then did not get re-minted by the imperial mints, and quickly became worn. Towards the end of the 7th century CE, Arabic copies of solidi – dinars issued by the caliph Abd al-Malik (685–705 CE), who had access to supplies of gold from the upper Nile – began to circulate in areas outside of the Byzantine empire. These corresponded in weight to only 20 carats (4.0 g) rather than the 24 carats of a recently minted solidus, but matched with the weight of the worn solidi that were circulating in those areas at the time. The two coins circulated together in these areas for a time.

== First dated coins ==
The first dated coins that can be assigned to the Muslims are copies of silver Dirhams of the Sassanian ruler Yazdegerd III, struck during the Caliphate of Uthman. These coins differ from the original ones in that an Arabic inscription is found in the obverse margins, normally reading "in the Name of Allah". The subsequent series was issued using types based on drachmas of Khosrow II, whose coins probably represented a significant proportion of the currency in circulation.

In parallel with the later Khosrau-type Arab-Sassanian coins, first issued under the Well-Guided Caliphs of Islam, a more extensive series was struck with Khosrau's name replaced by that of the local Arab governor or, in two cases, that of the Caliph. Historical evidence makes it clear that most of these coins bear Hijra dates. The earliest Muslim copper coins are anonymous and undated but a series exists which may have been issued during the Caliphates of Uthman or Ali. These are crude copies of Byzantine 12-nummus pieces of Heraclius from Alexandria.

== First silver dirham ==
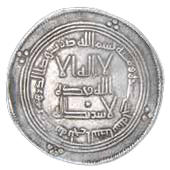
Silver dirham of the Umayyad Caliphate, minted at Balkh al-Baida in AH 111 ( 729–730 CE)

By the year 695 CE (AH 75) Abd al-Malik had decided on changes to the coinage. A scattering of patterned pieces in silver exist from this date, based on Sassanian prototypes but with distinctive Arabic reverses. This experiment, which maintained the Sassanian weight standard of 3.5–4.0 grams was not proceeded with, and in AH 79 (698 CE) a completely new type of silver coin was struck at 14 mints to a new nominal weight of 2.97 grams. Unlike the contemporary gold coinage, this figure does not seem to have been achieved in practice. The average weight of sixty undamaged specimens of AH 79–84 (698–704 CE) is only 2.71 grams, a figure very close to that for a unique coin of (AH 79) 698 struck with no mint name (as was the standard procedure for the gold dinars produced in Damascus). These new coins which bore the name of 'dirham', established the style of the Arab-Sassanian predecessors at 25 to 28 mm in diameter. Their design is composed of Arabic inscriptions surrounded by circles and annulets.

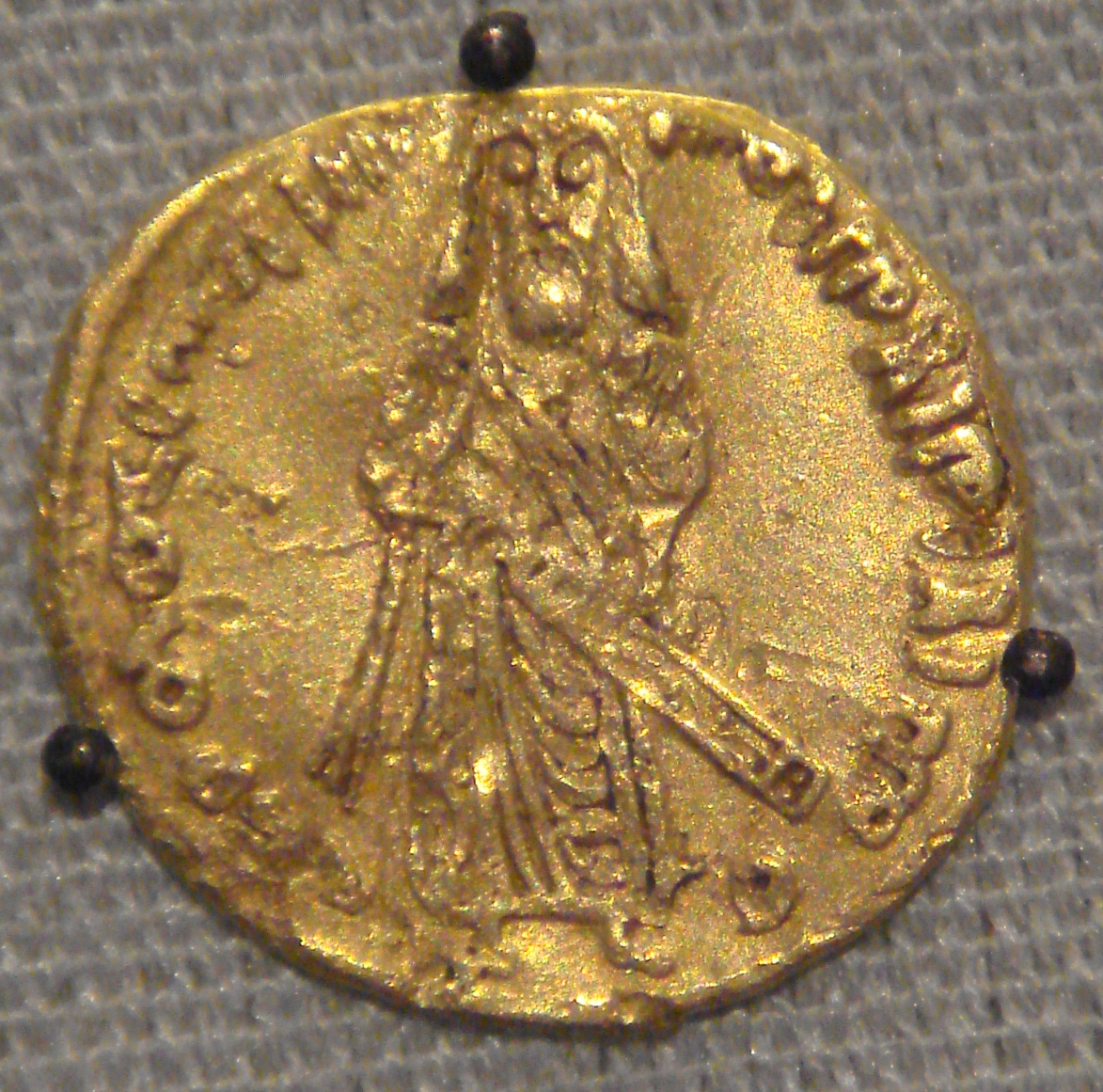
Umayyad gold dinar, minted 695 CE, obverse with image of Abd al-Malik

On each side there is a three- or four-line legend with a single circular inscription. Outside this are three line circles with, at first, five annulets surrounding them. The side normally taken as the obverse has as its central legend the Kalima or shahada: "There is no god except God alone, there is no partner with Him." Around it is the mint and date formula reading "In the Name of God: this Dirham was struck in [mint name e.g. Damascus] the year [e.g. 698, AH 79]". The reverse has a four line central inscription taken from the Surah 112 of the Quran; "Qul hu Allahu Ahad, Allahu-Samad, Lam yalid wa lam yulad wa lam yakul-lahu kufu-an ahad"'. The marginal legend states: "Muhammad is the Messenger of God, he was sent with guidance and the religion of truth to make it prevail over every other religion, averse though the idolaters may be" (Quran 9:33).

== First gold dinar ==
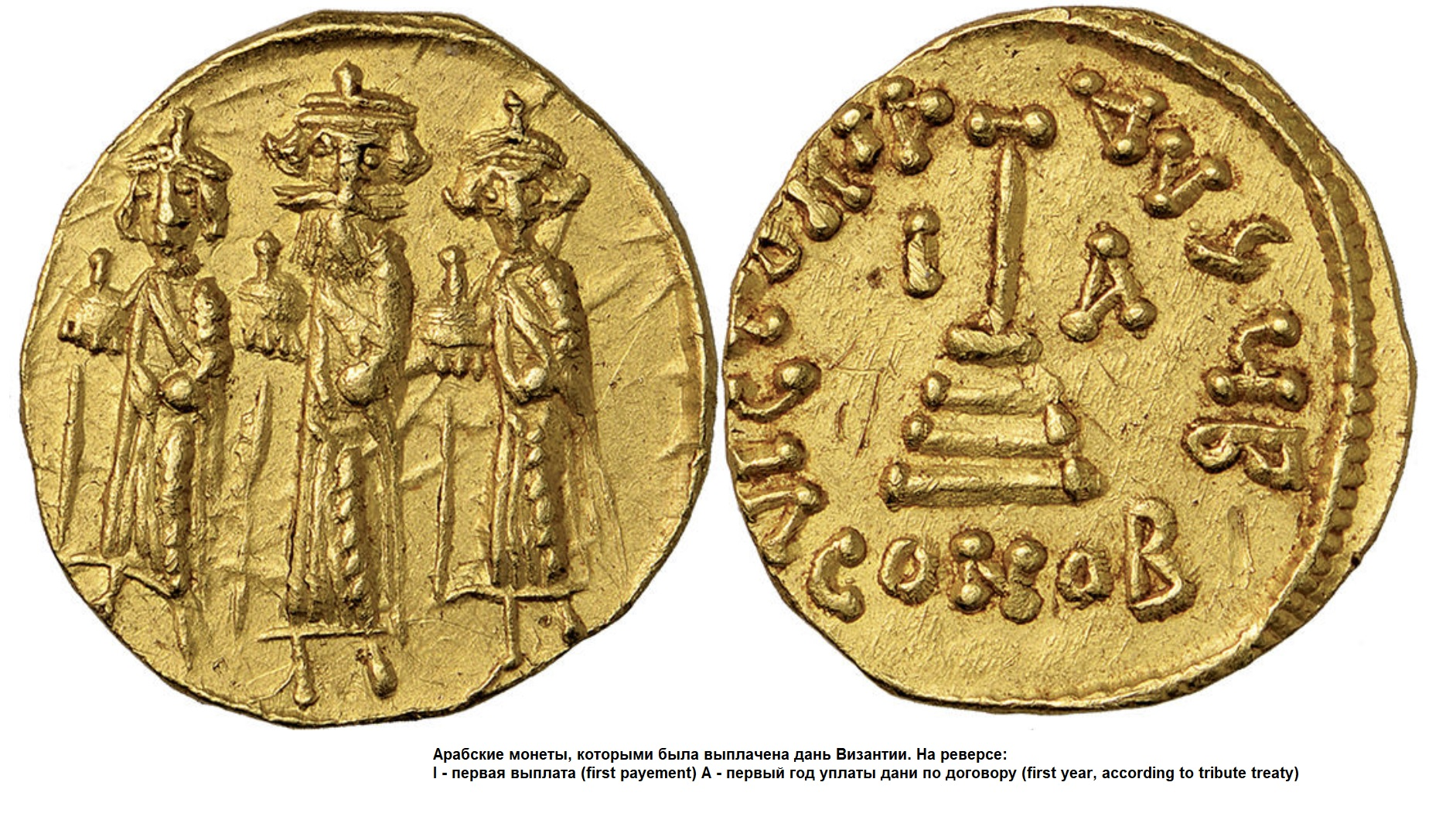
Umayyad gold Dinar, minted 692 C.E., obverse with three figures, reverse with altered "cross on steps" design.

The gold coins were first struck to the contemporary standard of 4.4 grams and with one or more Arabic standing figures on the obverse and an Arabic legend on the reverse. Dated coins exist from 680 (AH 74) and are named as dinars. These experimental issues were replaced in 683 (AH 77), except in North Africa and Spain, by completely epigraphical designs very similar to the designs adopted for the silver pieces but with a shorter reverse legend and no annulets or inner circles. This type was used without appreciable change for the whole of the Umayyad period, the coins being struck to a new and carefully controlled standard of 4.25 grams. This weight was reputed to be based on the average of the Byzantine solidi circulating at the time, was called a Mithqal, a term used earlier for 1/72 of a ratl. Evidence of the importance attached to the close control of the new Dinars is provided by the existence of glass weights, mainly from Egypt. They usually show the governor's name, sometimes the date but all marked with coin denomination.

Early gold dinars imitated Byzantine and Sassanian coins of the time, but as time progressed, they began to take on a more uniquely Islamic style. Two early examples, minted in approximately 692 and 694 CE, have similar designs. Both have a depiction of figures on the obverse while the reverse includes a pyramid-shaped pedestal and a staff with a circular head resting at the top. These two early coin types both bear significant resemblance to Byzantine coins of the same period and were all but copied whole cloth from Byzantine designs, the only alterations being the removal of the horizontal bar of the Byzantine cross for religious reasons and the conversion of figures on the front to wearing Islamic-style dress. In the year 692 CE, the shahada or profession of faith was added onto the obverse and in 694 CE it was added to the reverse. In the year 696–697 CE, images were almost completely removed from coins and were replaced by coins exclusively decorated with inscriptions.

The issues in gold from North Africa began as copies of the coins of Heraclius and his son (but with abbreviated shahada in Latin), the reverse "cross on steps" losing in most cases its cross piece. Dinars, halves and thirds were struck, all to the new weight standard. Later coins are dated by indiction, from Indiction II (703, AH 84–85) changing to the Hijra date in Roman numerals in 713 (AH 94) with Arabic phrases appearing in the field from 716 (AH 97). In 684 (AH 100), North Africa came into line with the eastern issues although the mint is named as Ifriqiya. The legends are shorter and the reverse has a new central inscription: "In the Name of God, the Merciful, the Compassionate". This was used also on the coins from al-Andalus, and on the half and third Dinars, most of which show no mint but may well have been struck in al-Andalus.

== Modern use ==
The modern gold dinar is not an official currency, but a private bullion coin, patterned after the historical currency. A series of gold dinars were released by ISIL, seeing limited circulation in Syria, with locals' Syrian pounds being taken away and replaced with the dinar in some regions.

== See also ==
- Fals
- Dirham
- Fatimid coinage

== Sources ==
- Porteous, John (1969). "The Imperial Foundations". Coins in History: A Survey of Coinage from the Reform of Diocletian to the Latin Monetary Union. Weidenfeld and Nicolson. pp. 14–33. ISBN 0-297-17854-7.
- Miles, G. C. (1965). "Dīnār". In Lewis, B.; Pellat, Ch. & Schacht, J. (eds.). The Encyclopaedia of Islam, Second Edition. Volume II: C–G. Leiden: E. J. Brill. pp. 297–299. OCLC 495469475.
