= Dirham =

Unit of currency in several Asian and African states

Nations in red currently use the dirham. Nations in green use a currency with a subdivision named dirham.

The dirham (Note: /ˈdɜːrhæm/ DUR-ham; Arabic: درهم), dirhem (Note: /ˈdɜːrhɛm/ DUR-hem) or drahm (Note: /ˈdrɑːm/) is a unit of currency and of mass. It is the name of the currencies of Morocco, the United Arab Emirates and Armenia, and is the name of a currency subdivision in Jordan, Libya, Qatar and Tajikistan. It was historically a silver coin.

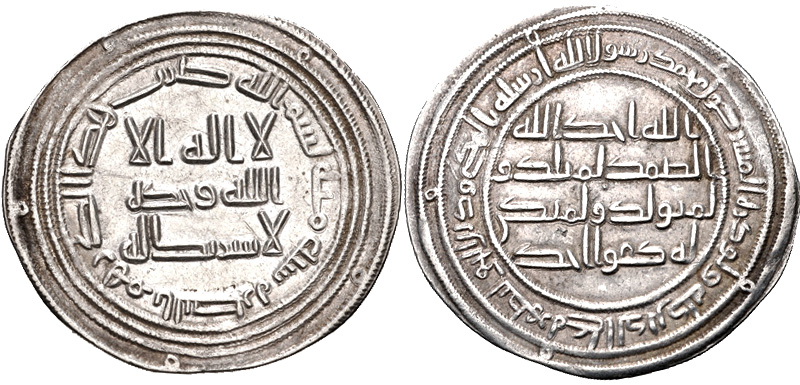
Silver dirham of Caliph Umar ibn Abd al-Aziz 718–719 CE

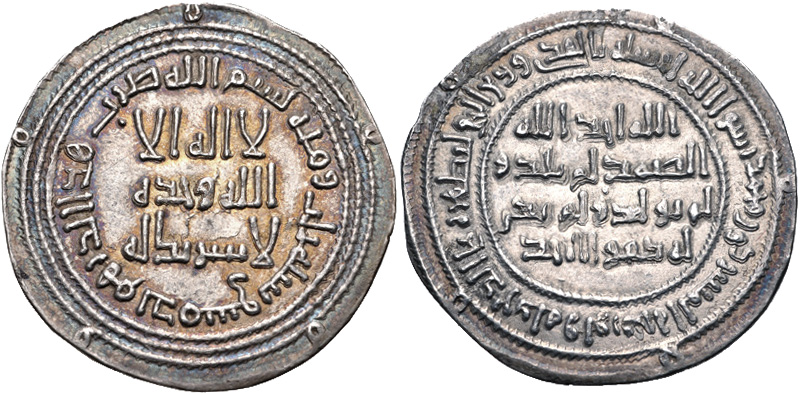
Silver dirham of Yazid II minted in 721–722 CE

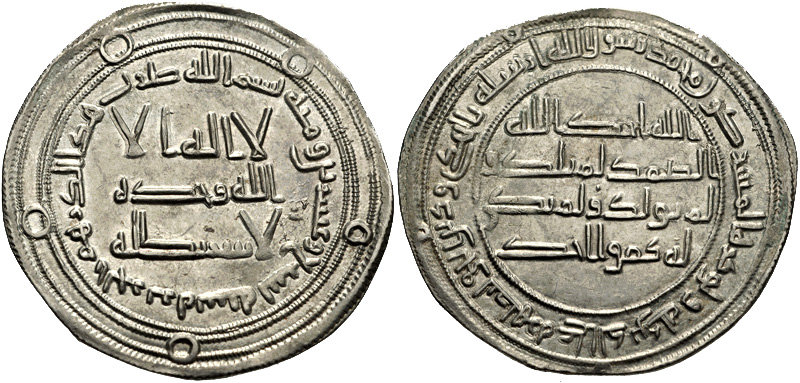
Silver dirham of Marwan II ibn Muhammad 749–745 CE

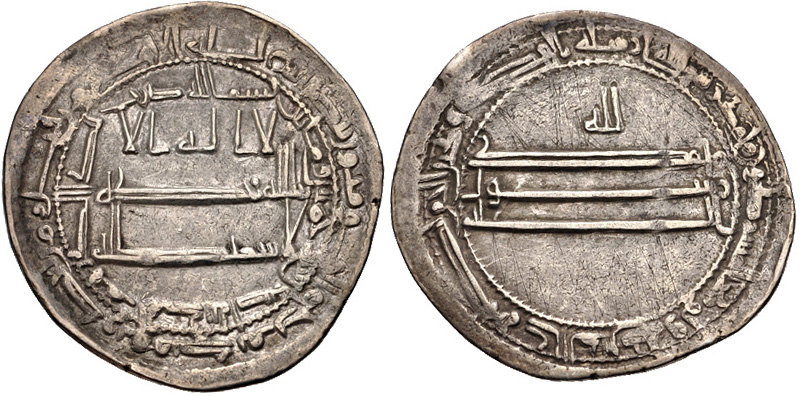
Silver dirham of As-Saffah 754–758 CE

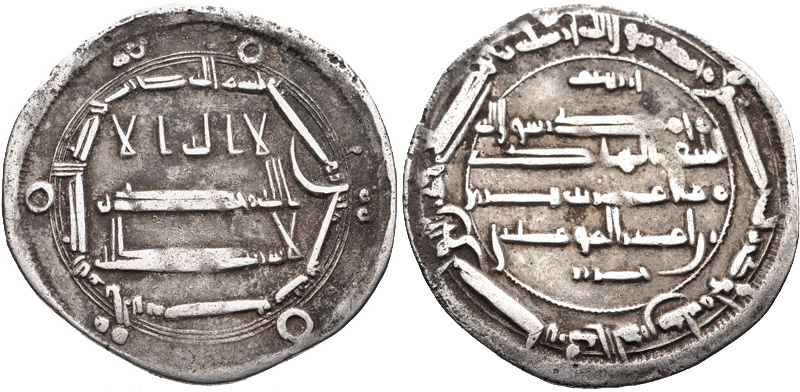
Silver dirham of Al-Hadi minted in 786–787 CE in al-Haruniya

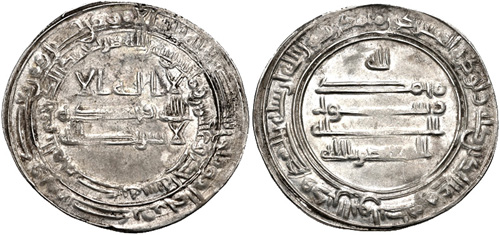
Silver dirham of Al-Mu'tasim, minted at al-Muhammadiya in 836–837 CE

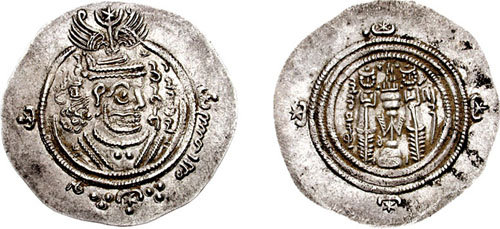
One of the first silver coins of the Umayyad Caliphate, still following Sassanid motifs, struck in the name of al-Hajjaj ibn Yusuf

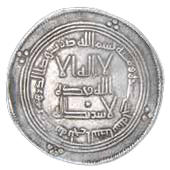
Later silver dirham of the Umayyad Caliphate, minted at Balkh in 729–730 CE (AH) 111)

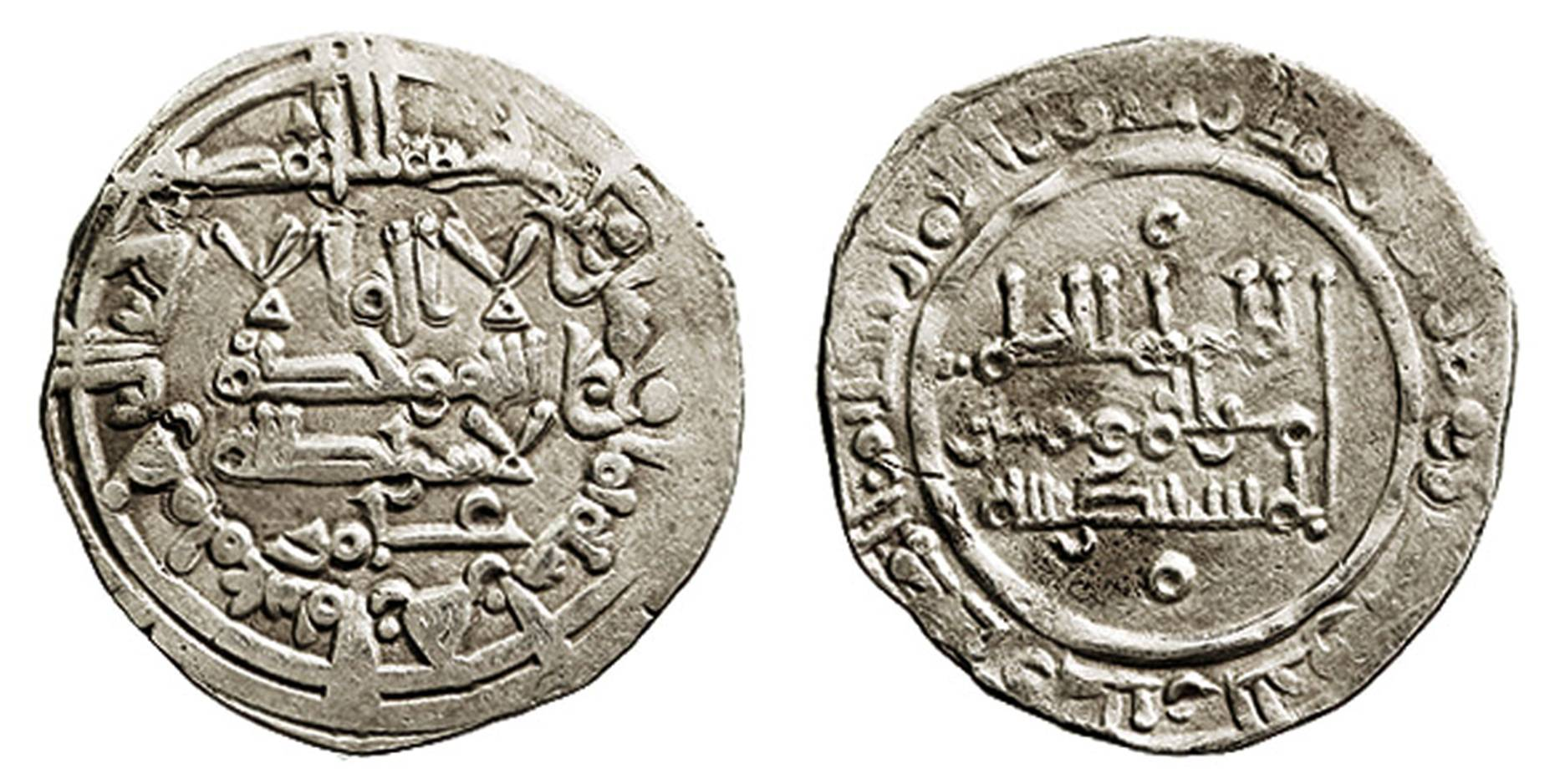
Silver dirham of Alhakén II, Caliph of Córdoba

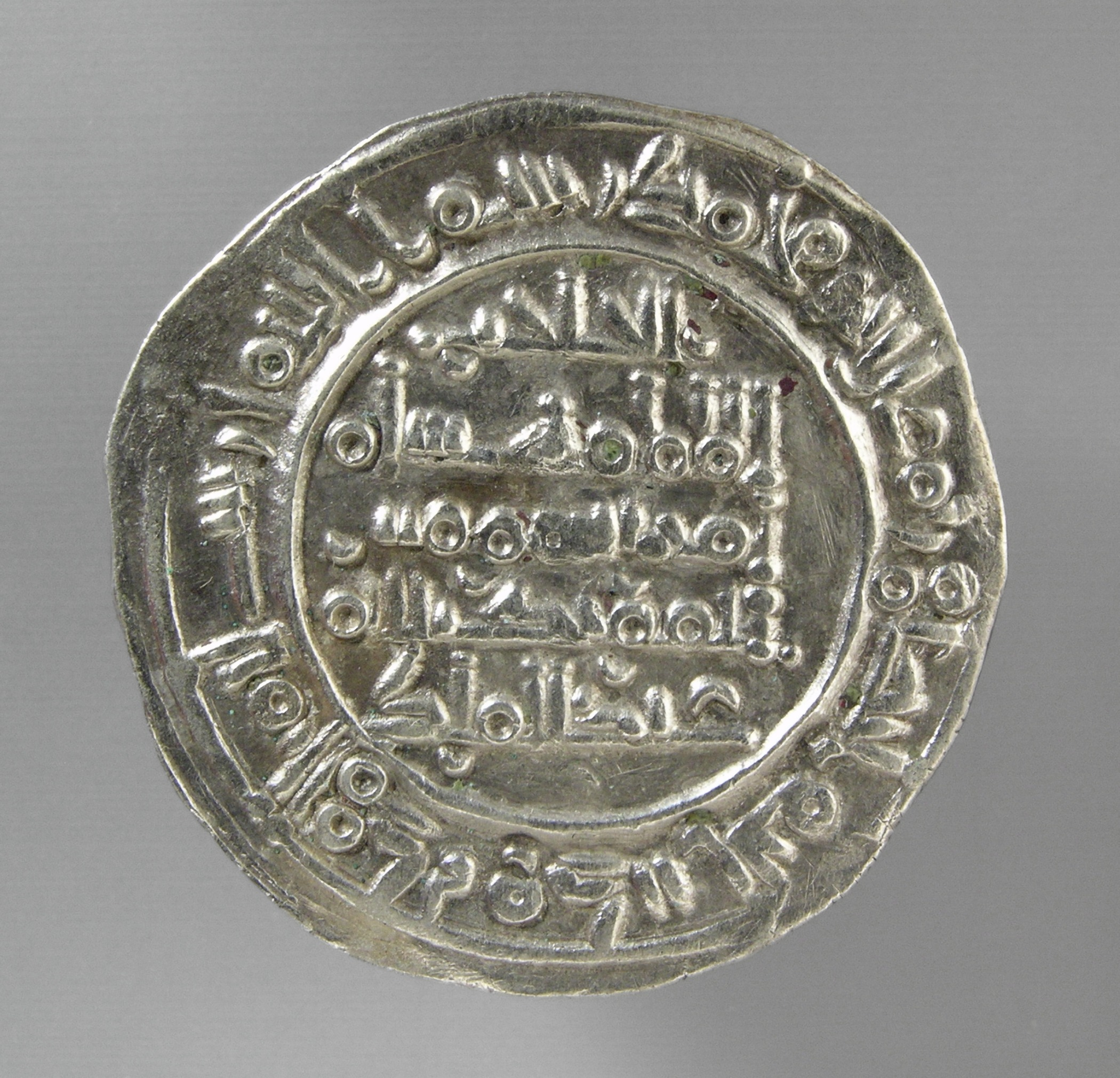
Silver dirham issued in 1002 by Hisham II, Caliph of Córdoba

== Unit of mass ==
The dirham was a unit of mass used across North Africa, the Middle East, Persia and Ifat; later known as Adal, with varying values.

The value of Islamic dirham was 14 qirat. 10 dirham equals 7 mithqal (2.975 gm of silver).

In the late Ottoman Empire (Ottoman Turkish: درهم), the standard dirham was 3.207 g; 400 dirhem equal one oka. The Ottoman dirham was based on the Sasanian drachm (in Middle Persian: 𐭦𐭥𐭦𐭭 drahm), which was itself based on the Greek dram/drachma.

In Egypt in 1895, it was equivalent to 47.661 troy grains (3.088 g).

There is currently a movement within the Islamic world to revive the dirham as a unit of mass for measuring silver, although the exact value is disputed (either 3 or 2.975 grams).

== History ==
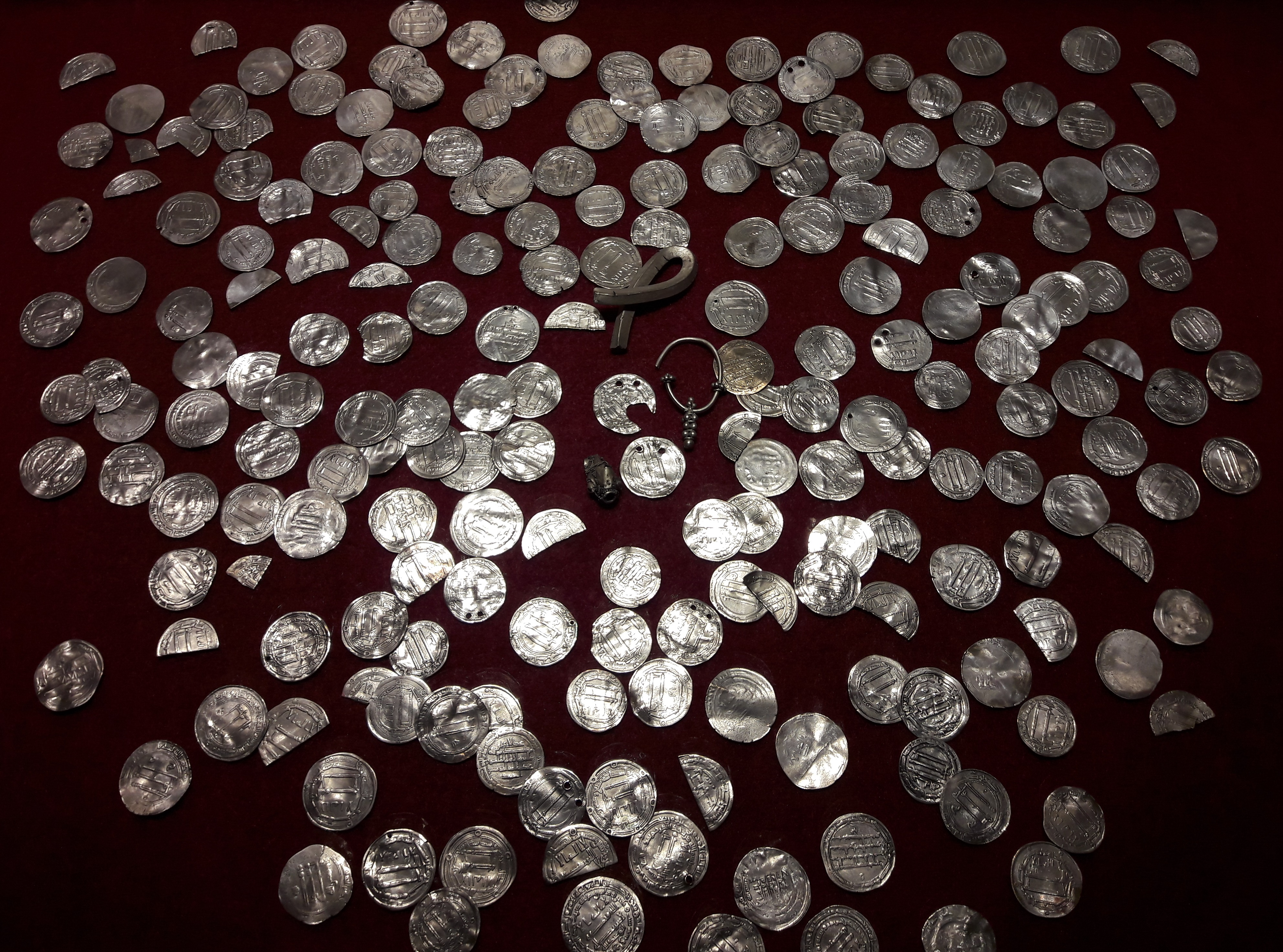
Silver hoard from Lublin-Czechów, comprising 214 silver dirhams issued between 711–712 and 882–883 CE, Lublin Museum.

The word "dirham" ultimately comes from drachma (δραχμή), the Greek coin. The Greek-speaking Byzantine Empire lay partially in the Levant and traded with Arabia, circulating the coin there in pre-Islamic times and afterward. Near the end of the 7th century the coin became an Islamic currency bearing the name of the sovereign and a religious verse. The Arabs introduced their own coins.

The Islamic dirham was 8 daniq. The dirham was struck in many Mediterranean countries, including Al-Andalus (Moorish Spain) and the Byzantine Empire (miliaresion), and could be used as currency in Europe between the 10th and 12th centuries, notably in areas with Viking connections, such as Viking York and Dublin.

=== Dirham in Jewish orthodox law ===
The dirham is frequently mentioned in Jewish orthodox law as a unit of weight used to measure various requirements in religious functions, such as the weight in silver specie pledged in Marriage Contracts (Ketubbah), the quantity of flour requiring the separation of the dough-portion, etc. Jewish physician and philosopher, Maimonides, uses the Egyptian dirham to approximate the quantity of flour for dough-portion, writing in Mishnah Eduyot 1:2: "And I found the rate of the dough-portion in that measurement to be approximately five-hundred and twenty dirhams of wheat flour, while all these dirhams are the Egyptian [dirham]." This view is repeated by Maran's Shulhan Arukh (Hil. Hallah, Yoreh Deah § 324:3) in the name of the Tur. In Maimonides' commentary of the Mishnah (Eduyot 1:2, note 18), Rabbi Yosef Qafih explains that the weight of each Egyptian dirham was approximately 3.333 grams, or what was the equivalent to 16 carob-grains which, when taken together, the minimum weight of flour requiring the separation of the dough-portion comes to approximately 1 kilo and 733 grams.

Rabbi Ovadiah Yosef, in his Sefer Halikhot ʿOlam (vol. 1, pp. 288–291), makes use of a different standard for the Egyptian dirham, saying that it weighed approximately 3.0 grams, meaning the minimum requirement for separating the priest's portion is 1 kilo and 560 grams. Others (e.g. Rabbi Avraham Chaim Naeh) say the Egyptian dirham weighed approximately 3.205 grams, which total weight for the requirement of separating the dough-portion comes to 1 kilo and 666 grams. Rabbi Shelomo Qorah (Chief Rabbi of Bnei Barak) wrote that the traditional weight used in Yemen for each dirham weighed 3.20 grams for a total of 31.5 dirhams given as the redemption of one's firstborn son (pidyon haben), or 3.36 grams for the 30 dirhams required by the Shulhan Arukh (Yoreh De'ah 305:1), and which in relation to the separation of the dough-portion made for a total weight of 1 kilo and 770.72 grams.

The word drachmon (Hebrew: דרכמון), used in some translations of Maimonides' commentary of the Mishnah, has in all places the same connotation as dirham.

== Modern-day currency ==
Currently the valid national currencies with the name dirham are:

Countries	Currency	ISO 4217 code
Morocco	Moroccan dirham	MAD
United Arab Emirates	United Arab Emirates dirham	AED
Armenia	Armenian dram	AMD

Modern currencies with the subdivision dirham or diram are:

Countries	Currency	ISO 4217 code	Subdivision
Libya	Libyan dinar	LYD	Dirham
Qatar	Qatari riyal	QAR	Dirham
Jordan	Jordanian dinar	JOD	Dirham
Tajikistan	Tajikistani somoni	TJS	Diram

The unofficial modern gold dinar, issued and/or proposed by several states and proto-states, is also divided into dirhams.

== See also ==
- Dinar
- Gold dinar
- Fals
