= Islamic coinage =

Process of manufacturing coins in Islamic civilization

After the early Muslim conquests brought the nascent caliphate into contact with the numismatic traditions of the Byzantine Empire and the Sasanian Empire, whose lands they took over, the Islamic world developed its own, distinctive tradition of coinage. Islamic currency consisted of gold (dinars), silver (dirhams), and copper or bronze (fals) coins, as well as their fractions and multiples. Initially these coins followed pre-Islamic patterns in iconography, but under Caliph Abd al-Malik ibn Marwan, a distinctive Islamic dinar type was created that eschewed images and carried the Islamic profession of faith. In the eastern parts of the caliphate, silver Arab–Sasanian coinage continued to be minted into the 9th century, before it was also replaced by Islamic patterns. The right to mint coins in one's own name became one of the chief attributes of sovereignty in Islam, and as autonomous and independent dynasties multiplied with the break-up of the Abbasid Caliphate in the 10th century, distinctive styles and sub-currencies emerged in the various states and regions as they sought to differentiate themselves from the Abbasid standard (e.g. Fatimid coinage). The typical Islamic coinage came to an end in the 19th and 20th centuries, as Muslim states adopted Western-style coinage practices and motifs.

Example of classical Islamic coinage under the Abbasid caliph al-Ma'mun
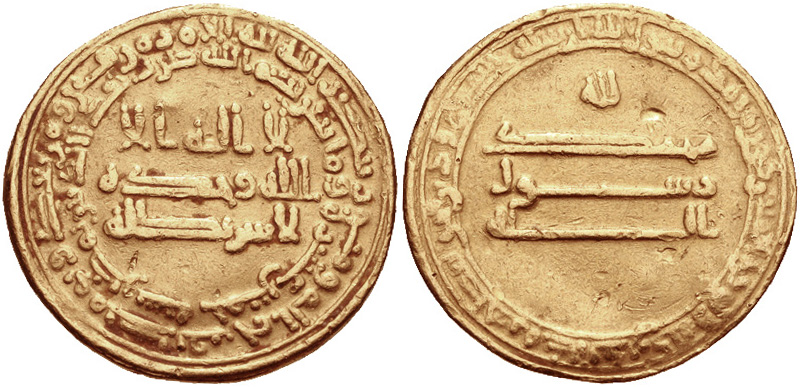
Gold dinar

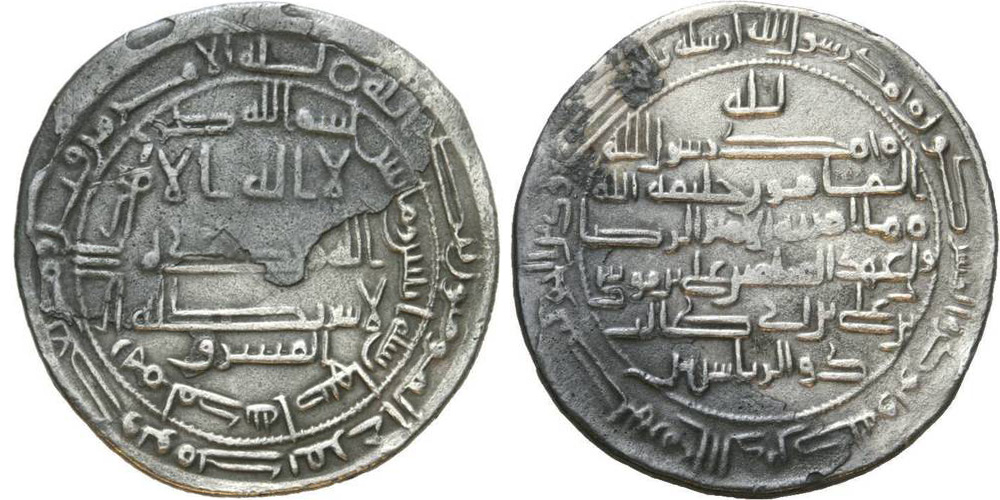
Silver dirham

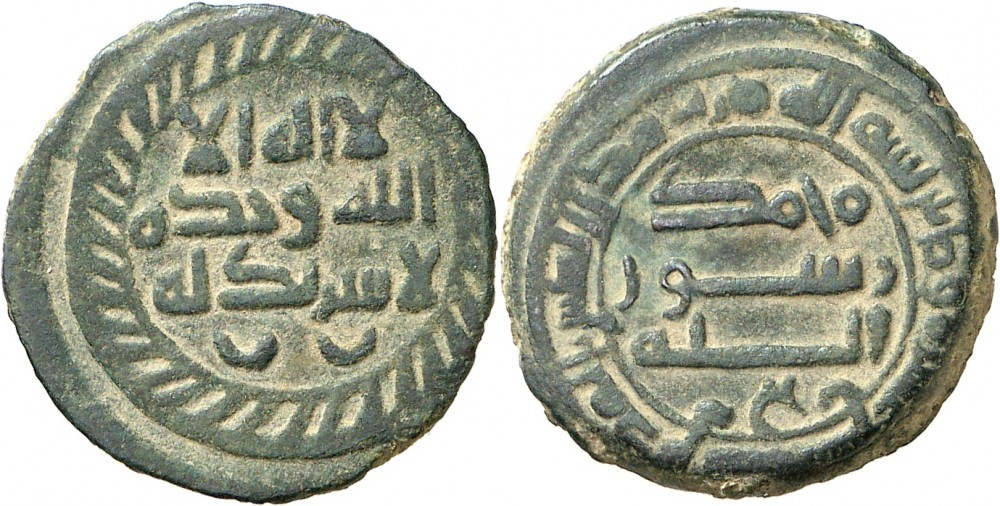
Copper fils

== Sources ==
- Bacharach, Jere L. (2010). "Signs of Sovereignty: The "Shahāda", the Qurʾanic Verses, and the Coinage of ʿAbd al-Malik". Muqarnas Online. 27. Brill: 1–30. doi:10.1163/22118993_02701002. ISSN 2211-8993. JSTOR 25769690.
- Bates, M. (1986). "ARAB-SASANIAN COINS". In Yarshater, Ehsan (ed.). Encyclopædia Iranica. Vol. II/3: ʿArab Moḥammad–Architecture IV. London and New York: Routledge & Kegan Paul. pp. 225–229. ISBN 978-0-71009-103-1.
- Darley-Doran, R. E. (1997). "Sikka 2. Coinage practice". In Bosworth, C. E.; van Donzel, E.; Heinrichs, W. P. & Lecomte, G. (eds.). The Encyclopaedia of Islam, Second Edition. Volume IX: San–Sze. Leiden: E. J. Brill. pp. 592–599. ISBN 978-90-04-10422-8.
- Ehrenkreutz, Andrew S. (1959). "Studies in the Monetary History of the Near East in the Middle Ages: The Standard of Fineness of Some Types of Dinars". Journal of the Economic and Social History of the Orient. 2 (2): 128–161. doi:10.2307/3596018. JSTOR 3596018.
- Ehrenkreutz, Andrew S. (1963). "Studies in the Monetary History of the Near East in the Middle Ages II: The Standard of Fineness of Western and Eastern Dīnārs before the Crusades". Journal of the Economic and Social History of the Orient. 6 (3): 243–277. doi:10.2307/3596267. JSTOR 3596267.
- Heidemann, Stefan (1998). "The Merger of Two Currency Zones in Early Islam. The Byzantine and Sasanian Impact on the Circulation in Former Byzantine Syria and Northern Mesopotamia". Iran. 36 (1): 95–112. doi:10.1080/05786967.1998.11834584.
- Miles, G. C. (1965). "Dīnār". In Lewis, B.; Pellat, Ch. & Schacht, J. (eds.). The Encyclopaedia of Islam, Second Edition. Volume II: C–G. Leiden: E. J. Brill. pp. 297–299. OCLC 495469475.
- Miles, G. C. (1965). "Dirham". In Lewis, B.; Pellat, Ch. & Schacht, J. (eds.). The Encyclopaedia of Islam, Second Edition. Volume II: C–G. Leiden: E. J. Brill. pp. 319–320. OCLC 495469475.
