= Khutba wa sikka =

Concept in Islam about a ruler's rights

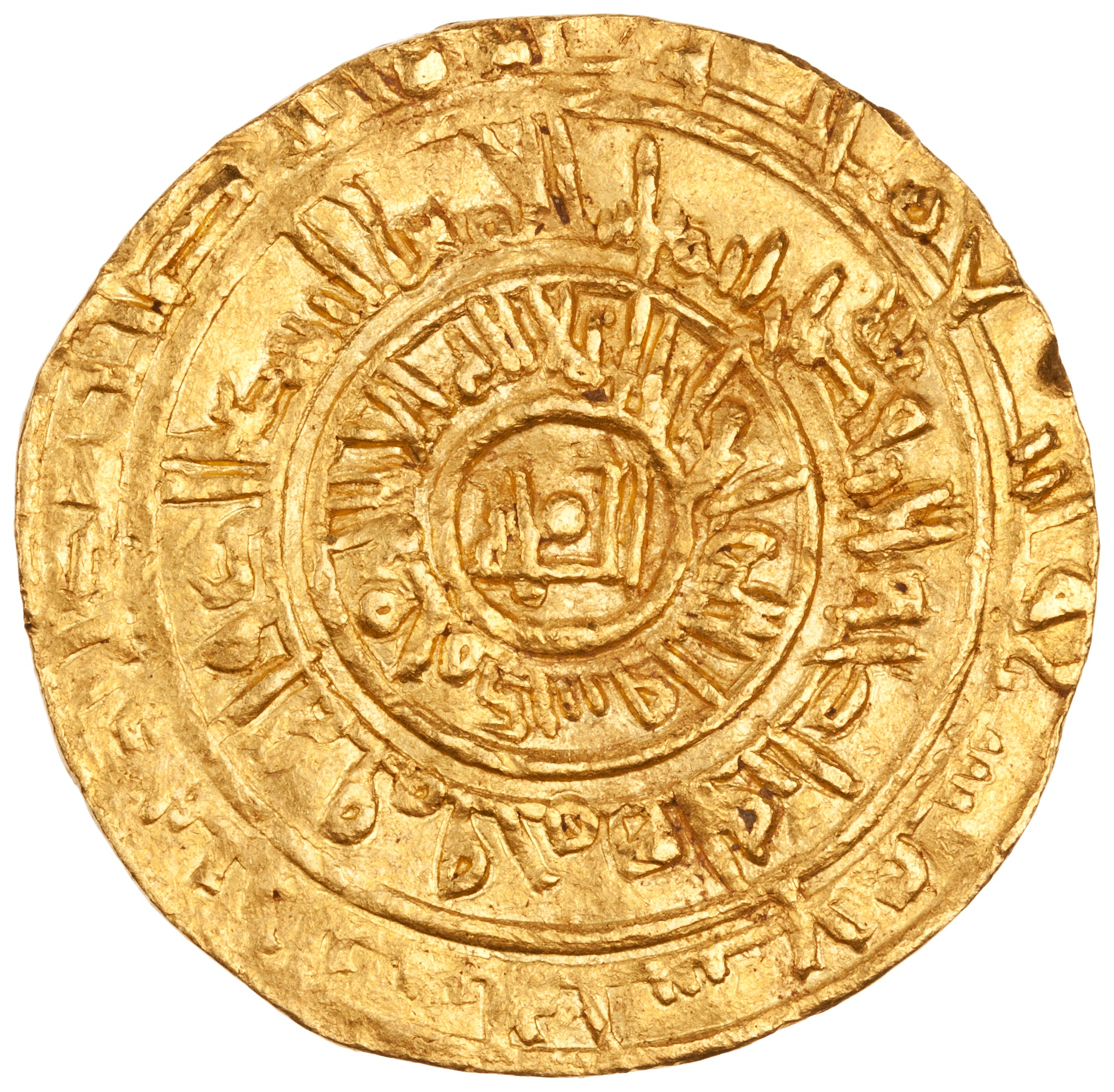
Fatimid-style gold dinar from the Mirdasid Emirate of Aleppo, citing the Fatimid caliph al-Zahir as suzerain of the emir Salih ibn Mirdas, and naming the latter's son, Thimal, as his successor

In the Islamic world, the term khutba wa sikka (Arabic: خطبة و سكة, lit. 'sermon and currency') referred to the two key attributes of sovereignty: minting coins (especially of gold or silver) in one's own name, and being named in the khutba, the sermon that precedes the Friday prayer.

The term sikka originally referred to the iron die used to stamp designs on coins, and came to be used for the designs themselves, and eventually the institution of the mint. As the power of the Abbasid Caliphate waned during the late 9th century, the numerous de facto autonomous rulers who emerged in the Islamic world, such as Ya'qub al-Saffar or Ahmad ibn Tulun, added their own names to the coinage underneath that of the caliph, as the last vestige of Abbasid authority, but also as a token of caliphal recognition, suzerainty, and thus legitimacy for the new dynasties. As the historian R. E. Darley-Doran writes, "whether by usurpation or grant from the caliph, the presence of names on the coinage came to be seen as a right that could be exercised by any serious rebel, semi-autonomous local governor or faithful ally of the 'Abbasid caliphate". In the 10th century, when the caliphs themselves became puppets of their commanders-in-chief, the names of the latter also appeared in the coinage. Likewise, in the Friday sermon, held from the pulpit, and where only the sovereign ruler was originally mentioned, but as the caliphs became puppets, the real power-holders also began to be mentioned in the sermon. The phrase qani'a fulan bi'l sikka wa'l-khutba ("he was satisfied with the coin and sermon"), reflecting this practice, came to mean someone who was master of something only in name, without real power.

With the emergence of the rival caliphates of the Fatimids, Umayyads and Almohads, changes in coin design were undertaken deliberately to differentiate themselves from the Abbasid model and set forth the respective regimes' individual claims to authority. Conversely, events like the Fall of the Fatimid Caliphate in 1171 were marked with the resumption of the Abbasid allegiance and the minting of coinage on the Abbasid model, naming the Abbasid caliph, and the omission of a ruler in coinage and sermon was the usual way to declare independence. In this manner, changes to the rulers mentioned in the sermon and coinage, or the choice of specific legends on coins, became indicative of switches in the political and even religious allegiance of regional potentates or cities. Such changes were not only imposed by an imperial centre; local potentates also changed the names they used according to which patron they sought protection or advantage from. Islamic coinage has therefore become an invaluable tool for modern historians trying to reconstruct the political history of the medieval Islamic world.

== Sources ==
- Bosworth, C. E. (1997). "Sikka 1. Legal and constitutional aspects". In Bosworth, C. E.; van Donzel, E.; Heinrichs, W. P. & Lecomte, G. (eds.). The Encyclopaedia of Islam, Second Edition. Volume IX: San–Sze. Leiden: E. J. Brill. pp. 591–592. doi:10.1163/1573-3912_islam_COM_1076. ISBN 978-90-04-10422-8.
- Darley-Doran, R. E. (1997). "Sikka 2. Coinage practice". In Bosworth, C. E.; van Donzel, E.; Heinrichs, W. P. & Lecomte, G. (eds.). The Encyclopaedia of Islam, Second Edition. Volume IX: San–Sze. Leiden: E. J. Brill. pp. 592–599. ISBN 978-90-04-10422-8.
- Goldziher, I. (1971). "On the Development of the Hadīth: II. Umayyads and ʿAbbāsids". In Stern, S. M. (ed.). Muslim Studies (Muhammedanische Studien), Volume Two. Translated by C. R. Barber and S. M. Stern. Albany: State University of New York Press. pp. 38–88. ISBN 0-87395-234-0.
- Lewis, Bernard (2004). From Babel to Dragomans: Interpreting the Middle East. Oxford and New York: Oxford University Press. ISBN 0-19-517336-8.
- Wensinck, A. J. (1986). "K̲h̲uṭba". In Bosworth, C. E.; van Donzel, E.; Lewis, B. & Pellat, Ch. (eds.). The Encyclopaedia of Islam, Second Edition. Volume V: Khe–Mahi. Leiden: E. J. Brill. pp. 74–75. ISBN 978-90-04-07819-2.
- Ibn Khaldûn, The Muqaddimah. An Introduction to History. Translated by Franz Rosenthal (Second ed.). Princeton, NJ: Princeton University Press. 1967. ISBN 0-691-09797-6.
