= Akçe =

Chief monetary unit of the Ottoman Empire

آقچه (Ottoman Turkish)
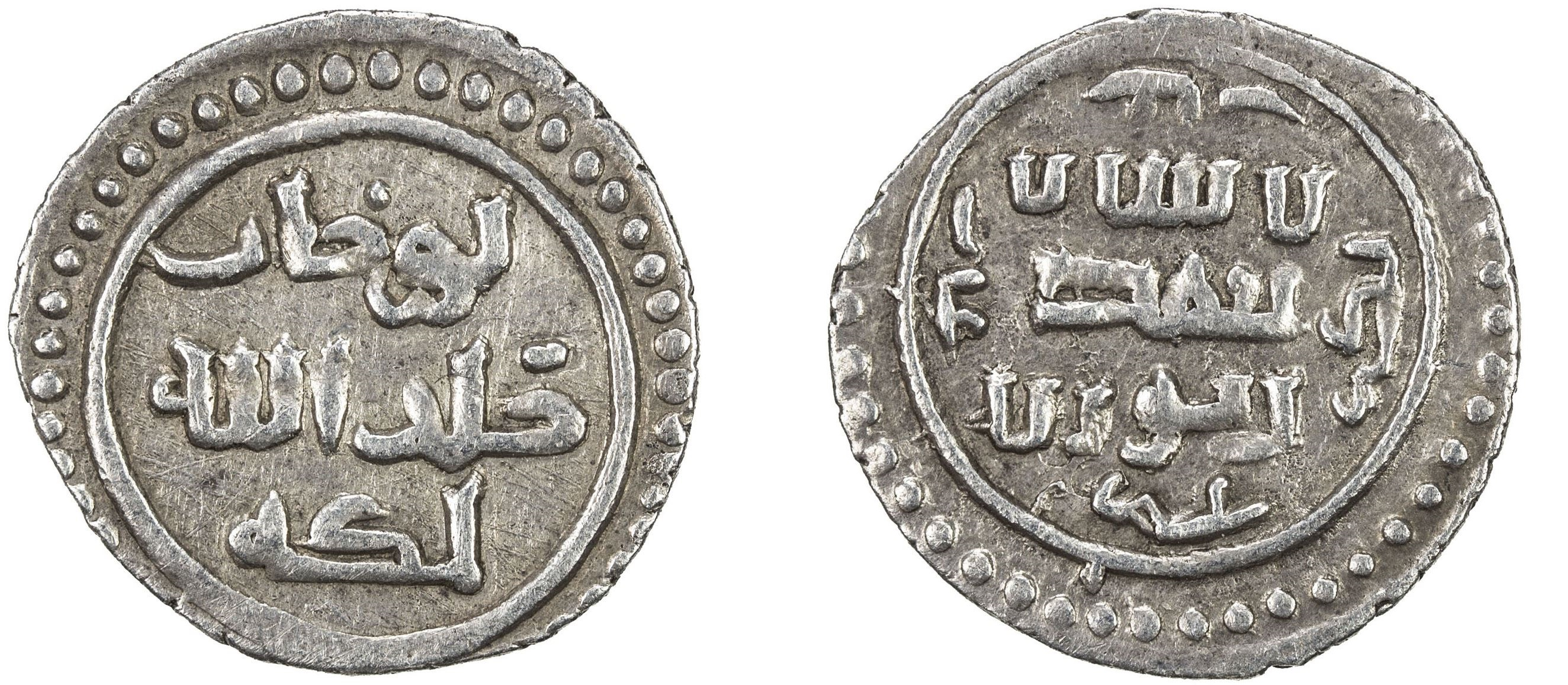
- Akçe of Orhan

Demographics
- User(s): Various: Anatolian Beyliks; Aq Qoyunlu; Crimean Khanate; Ottoman Empire
- This infobox shows the latest status before this currency was rendered obsolete.

The akçe or akça (anglicized as akche, akcheh or aqcha; Ottoman Turkish: آقچه; Turkish pronunciation: [akˈt͡ʃe], [akˈt͡ʃa], known in Europe as asper) was a silver coin which was the chief monetary unit of the Ottoman Empire. It was also used in other states including the Anatolian Beyliks, the Aq Qoyunlu, and the Crimean Khanate. The basic meaning of the word is "silver" or "silver money", deriving from the Turkish word ak ('white') and the diminutive suffix -ça.

== Cost ==
Three akçes were equal to one para. One-hundred and twenty akçes equalled one kuruş. Later after 1687 the kuruş became the main unit of account, replacing the akçe. In 1843, the silver kuruş was joined by the gold lira in a bimetallic system. Its weight fluctuated; one source estimates it between 1.15 and 1.18 grams. The name akçe originally referred to a silver coin but later the meaning changed and it became a synonym for money.

== History ==
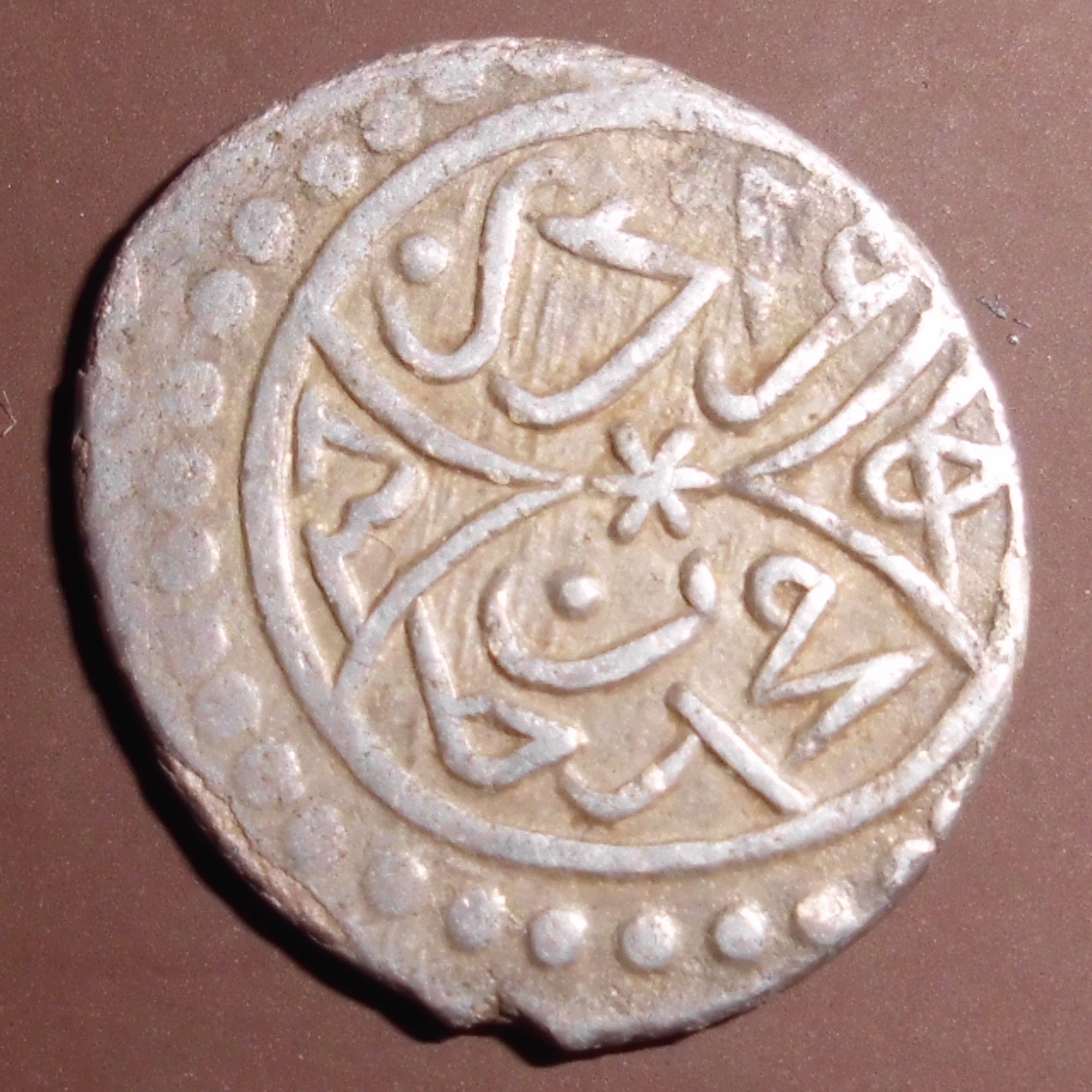
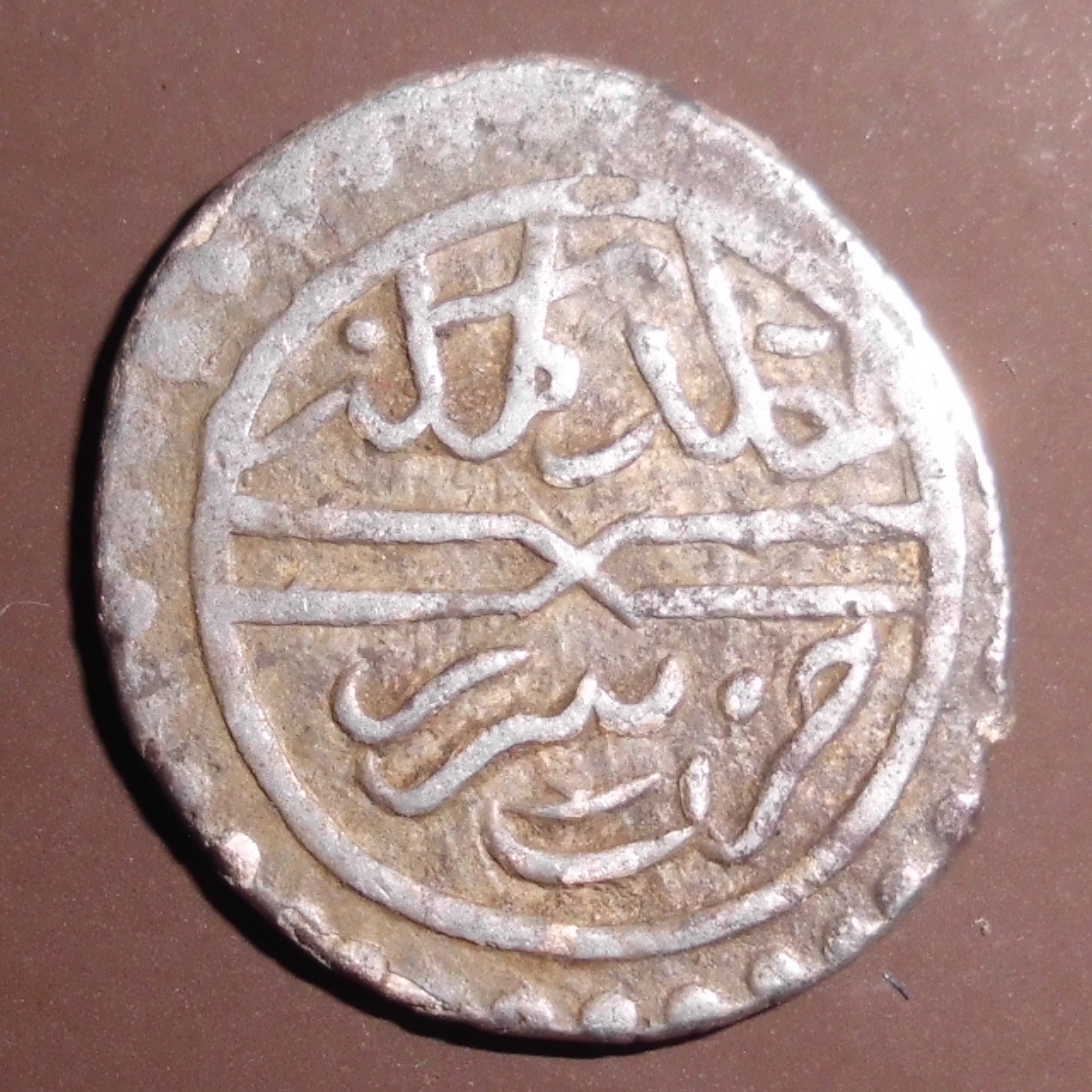
Obverse (left) and reverse (right) Murad II's akçe, c. 1430-1431 AD

The mint in Novo Brdo, a fortified mining town in the Serbian Despotate rich with gold and silver mines, began to strike akçe in 1441 when it was captured by the Ottoman forces for the first time.

The Suleiman Mosque in Istanbul is said to have cost 59 million akçe when it was constructed in the 1550s. This amount is said to have equalled 700,000 ducats in gold (probably Venetian).

== Debasement ==
Silver content and index in an Ottoman akçe.

Year	Silver (g)	Index
1450–60	0.85	100
1490–1500	0.68	80
1600	0.29	34
1700	0.13	15
1800	0.048	6

Value compared to the gold ducat of Venice by years:

Year	Ottoman akçes
1431	35
1475	45
1491	52
1547	60
1585	110
1645	160
1659	220
1660	300
1721	375
1728	400
1737	440

== See also ==
- Akşa
- Manghir
