= Kokand tenga =

Currency of Kokand until 1876

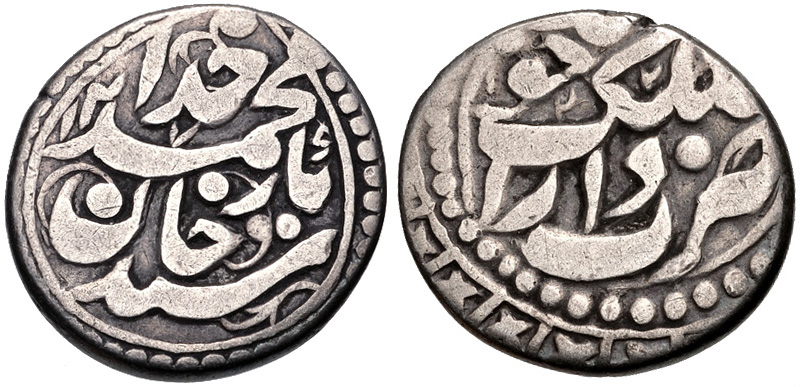
Tenga of Muhammad Khudayar Khan, struck at the Kokand mint, dated 1862–1863

The tenga was the currency of Kokand until 1876. Silver tenga circulated with copper pul and gold tilla. There was no fixed relationship between the three denominations. The Russian ruble replaced the Pul, Tenga and Tilla.
