= Zawila (disambiguation) =

Zawila may refer to:

- Zawila, Libya
- Zawīla, a suburb of Mahdia, Tunisia
- Zeila, a port in Somalia
- Zeila (historical region), historic region in the Horn of Africa
