= Mithqal =

Unit of mass equal to 4.25 grams (0.137 ozt)

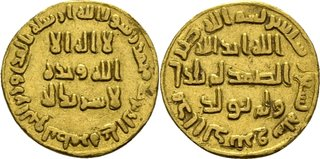
Gold dinar of Umayyad Caliph Abd al-Malik ibn Marwan, minted at Damascus, Syria in AH 75 (697/698 CE), having a weight of almost 1 mithqāl (5 grams)

Mithqāl (Arabic: مثقال, romanized: miṯqāl) is a unit of mass equal to around 4.25 to 4.5g which is mostly used for measuring precious metals, such as gold, and other commodities, like saffron.

The name was also applied as an alternative term for the gold dinar, a coin that was used throughout much of the Islamic world from the 8th century onward and survived in parts of Africa until the 19th century. The name of Mozambique's currency since 1980, the metical, is derived from mithqāl.

== Etymology ==
The word mithqāl (Arabic: مثقال; “weight, unit of weight”) comes from the Arabic thaqala (ثقل), meaning “to weigh” (cf. Hebrew: שקל, romanized: shekel). Other variants of the unit in English include miskal (from Persian or Urdu مثقال; misqāl), mithkal, mitkal and mitqal.

== Indian mithqaal ==
In India, the measurement is known as mithqaal. It contains 4 mashas and 3½ raties (rata'ii; مثقال).

It is equivalent to 4.25 grams when measuring gold, or 4.5 grams when measuring commodities. It may be more or less than this.

== Nikki mithqal ==
A gold coin minted in Nikki, Benin and known as the mithqal was in wide circulation in West Africa in the 18th century, particularly the Niger bend. It was useable in the trans-Saharan trade and coexisted with the use of cowries as shell money.

== Iranian Mithqal ==
Nakhud is a Baháʼí unit of mass used by Bahá'u'lláh. The mithqāl had originally consisted of 24 nakhuds, but in the Bayán, the collective works of the Báb, this was reduced to 19.

== See also ==
- Nisab
