= Fils (currency) =

Currency denomination in Arab countries and a coin in Umayyad Caliphate

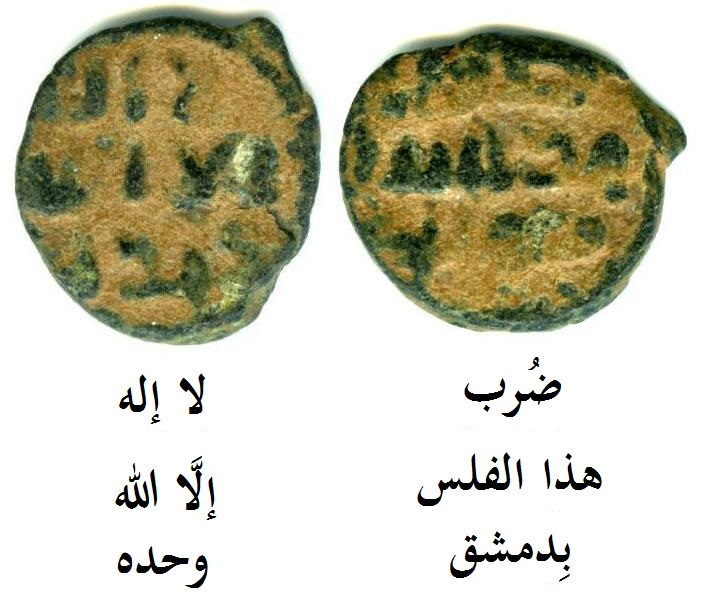
A fals minted in Damascus between 696 and 750. On one side it reads, "There is no god but God"; on the other, "Minted in Damascus".

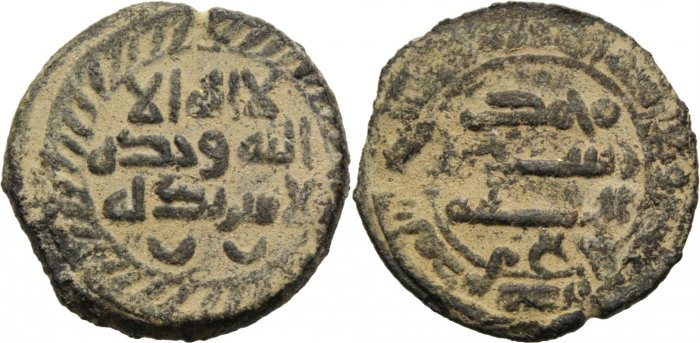
Fals of al-Ma'mun, AH 219 (834/5 CE), al-Quds (Jerusalem). Under the Umayyads Jerusalem was known by its Roman name Iliya Filastin ("Aelia Palaestina"), but from the time of Caliph al-Ma'mun, it was given the Islamic religious name al-Quds (meaning «holiness» or «sanctity»).

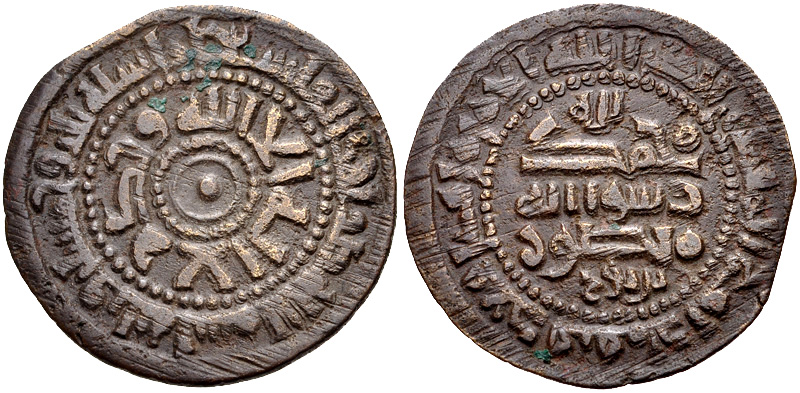
Fals of Mansur ibn Nuh, minted in Bukhara, AH 353 (964 CE), commemorating the Abbasid caliph al-Muti

The fils (Arabic: فلس) is a subdivision of currency used in some Arab countries, such as, in modern times, Iraq and Bahrain. The term is a modern retranscription of fals, an early medieval Arab copper coin first produced by the Umayyad Caliphate (661–750) beginning in the late 7th century and used throughout the region under its rule.

"Fils" is the singular form in Arabic, not plural (as its final consonant might indicate to an English speaker). The plural form of fils is fulūs pl. fulus which can also refer to small amounts of money or to money in general in contemporary dialects of Arabic (eg. Egyptian, Iraqi, Levantine and many other varieties of Arabic). The plural form closely resembles the Greek follis from which the Arabic is derived. The French term flouze is borrowed from Arabic. It is also absorbed into Malay language through the word fulus فولوس.

100 Fils (Bahrain).
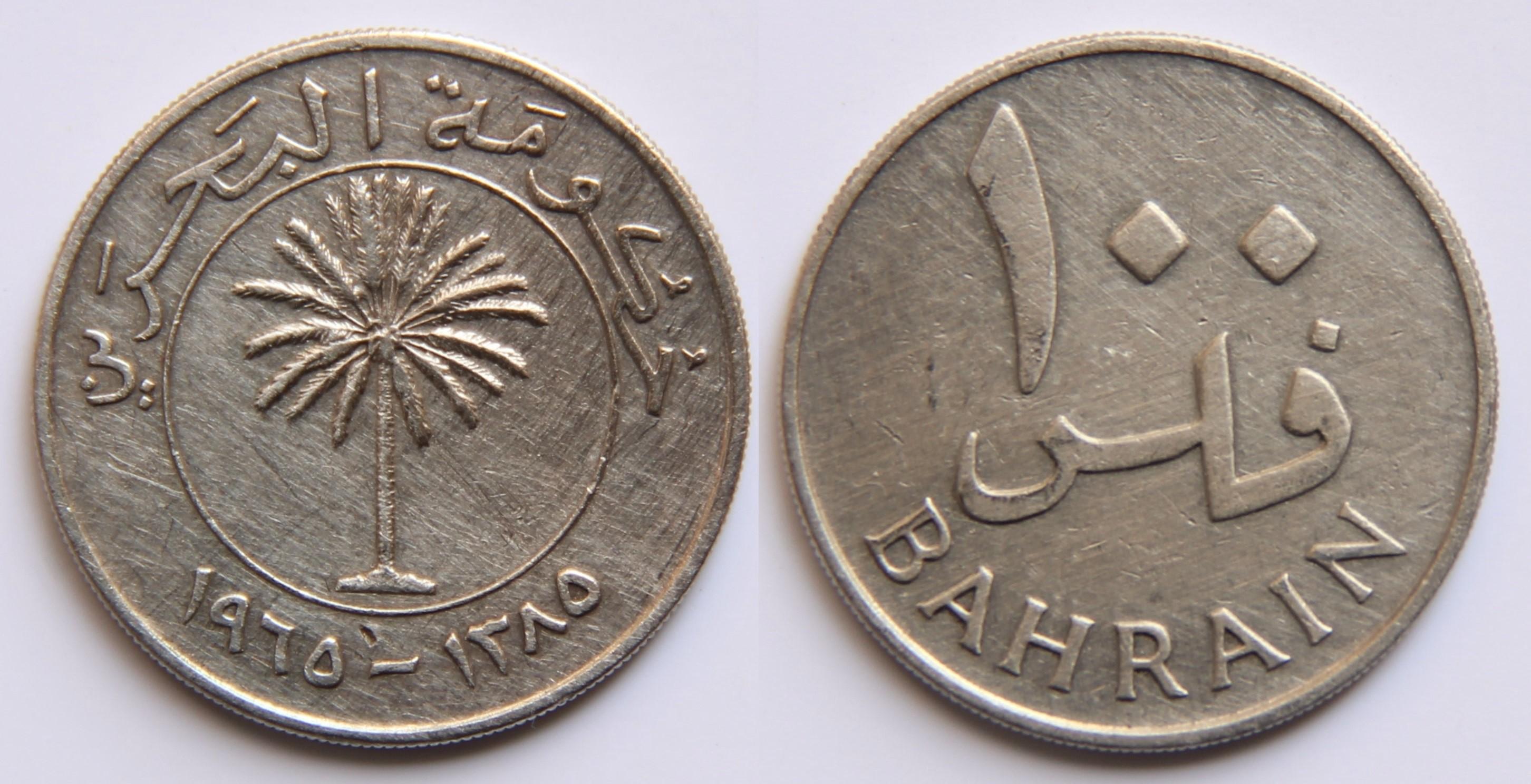
First side of the image: Obverse: A palm tree with lettering "حكومة البحرين" (Government of Bahrain) and year of minting in Gregorian and Islamic years (1965-1385) inscribed in Arabic.
Second side of the image: Reverse: Face-value and country name.
8,312,000 coins minted in 1965
- 1 Bahraini dinar = 1000 fulūs
- 1 Emirati dirham = 100 fulus
- 1 Iraqi dinar = 1000 fulūs
- 1 Jordanian dinar = 1000 fulūs
- 1 Kuwaiti dinar = 1000 fulūs
- 1 Yemeni rial = 100 fulūs

== History ==
The term fils appears on the earliest coins produced in the area of Greater Syria during the transition from Byzantine imperial rule to that of Umayyad Caliphate. The earliest examples of these Byzantine-Arab coins were bilingual and they are appear in both Jund Filastin and Jund al-Urdunn with the producing mints undeclared in the 7th century. The term Arabic: فلس, romanized: fils comes from the Byzantine Greek: follis, a Roman and later Byzantine copper coin. As with most Islamic coinage, the fals was aniconic and usually featured ornate Arabic script on both sides. Various copper fals were produced until the 19th century. Their weight varied, from one gram to ten grams or more.

== In popular culture ==
- The Malay derivant fulus was used as the basis for naming the fictional setting of Metrofulus in the 2006 Malaysian superhero film Cicakman.

== See also ==
- Falus, coin of Morocco (1672–1901)
