= Jawdhar =

Eunuch and minister of the Fatimid Caliphate

Jawdhar (Arabic: جوذر, before 909 – March 973), surnamed al-Ustadh (Arabic: الأستاذ, lit. 'the Master'), was a eunuch slave who served the Fatimid caliphs al-Qa'im, al-Mansur, and al-Mu'izz as chamberlain and de facto chief minister until his death. He was an extremely powerful figure in the Fatimid court, and was ranked immediately after the caliph and his designated heir. The accession of al-Mansur was probably due to Jawdhar's machinations, and he was placed in charge of keeping the new caliph's relatives under house arrest. He enjoyed close relations with the Kalbid emirs of Sicily, which enabled him to engage in profitable commerce with the island. Jawdhar accompanied al-Mu'izz during the migration of the court from Ifriqiya to Egypt, but died on the way at Barqa. His collected documents and letters were published after his death by his secretary as the Sirat al-Ustadh Jawdhar, and form one of the main historical sources for the governance of the Fatimid state in the period.

== Origin and early career ==
Jawdhar was a eunuch slave of Slavic origin (Saqaliba) who entered the service of the Aghlabid dynasty that ruled Ifriqiya. When the Aghlabids were overthrown and the new Fatimid ruler, Caliph al-Mahdi Billah (r. 909–934) entered the Aghlabid capital, Raqqada, in January 910, he had the Slavic palace slaves mustered before him, assigning them to various family members. Saqaliba eunuchs were highly prized at the Aghlabid court: far removed from their homelands—usually the Balkans—and without any family in Ifriqiya, they were entirely dependent on their masters, and correspondingly displayed great loyalty to them. Although still a boy, Jawdhar made an impression on al-Mahdi with his austerity and ability, and the new caliph assigned him to the household of his son and designated successor, al-Qa'im (r. 934–946).

Jawdhar quickly rose to become head of al-Qa'im's palace administration, and accompanied his master in at least one of the unsuccessful invasions of Abbasid-ruled Egypt in 914–915 and 919–921. Later, during al-Qa'im's campaign into the western Maghreb, Jawdhar was left behind at the Fatimid capital of al-Mahdiya as the steward of the heir-apparent's palace. After al-Qa'im's accession in 934, Jawdhar became the supervisor of the state storehouses for clothing, as well as the treasury.

== Under al-Mansur ==
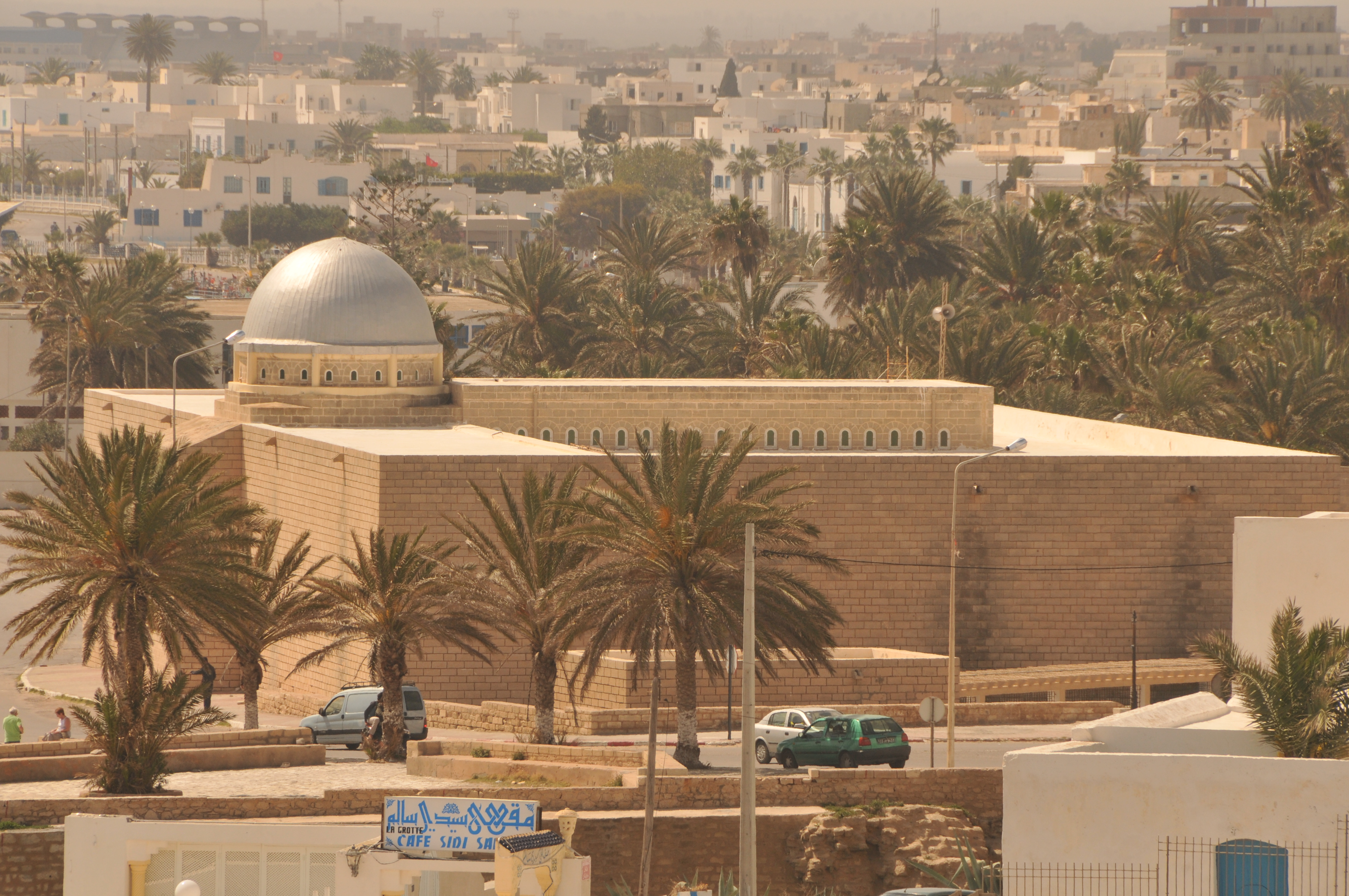
The Fatimid-era Great Mosque of al-Mahdiya

According to the official Fatimid accounts, al-Qa'im died on 17 May 946, at a critical moment for the Fatimid Caliphate, when a large-scale rebellion under the Ibadi Berber preacher Abu Yazid had overrun Ifriqiya and was threatening al-Mahdiya itself. Al-Qa'im was succeeded not by his oldest son, but by the younger Isma'il, who became the new caliph as al-Mansur (r. 946–953). Jawdhar insists in his memoirs that he was the trustee of al-Mansur's undisclosed nomination as his father's heir already at the time of al-Qa'im's own accession in 934, but modern historians of the Fatimid period, such as Heinz Halm and Michael Brett, suspect that al-Mansur's unheralded rise to power was the result of a palace intrigue headed by none other than Jawdhar, with the participation of other figures from al-Qa'im's harem. It is clear that already during al-Qa'im's reign, the future al-Mansur had close relations with Jawdhar, visiting his residence and corresponding with him on various topics.

Jawdhar himself played a prominent role in safeguarding al-Mansur's position: the new caliph ordered the confinement of all his uncles and brothers to the palace under Jawdhar's supervision. When al-Mansur managed to break the siege of al-Mahdiya and pursued the retreating rebels inland, Jawdhar remained behind in charge of the capital and the government. Following a victory over the rebel forces on 13 August 946, it was Jawdhar who read the victory dispatch before the congregation at the Great Mosque of Mahdiya.

When the rebel leader was finally defeated and captured on 15 August 947, al-Mansur, in the dispatch announcing his victory, set Jawdhar free. Apart from robes of honour and other gifts and tokens of esteem, al-Mansur also gave Jawdhar the honorific title mawla amir al-muminin (lit. 'Client of the Commander of the Faithful'), formally placed him in third place in the order of precedence after the caliph and his heir, and even included his name in the official tiraz, the inscribed bands sewn onto government-issued fabrics. Halm qualifies his role as "majordomo". He was involved in all matters concerning the administration of the Fatimid state, from the military and disputes among Fatimid vassals to the affairs of individual notables. For the next quarter-century, writes the historian Michael Brett, Jawdhar would be "the iron man of the administration" as the caliph's right-hand man, a position which earned him considerable antipathy, and few friends.

Apart from the agents appointed from his own entourage, his only political allies among the wider Fatimid elites were the Kalbids. Jawdhar had close relations with the Kalbids, serving as foster parent to two of the sons of Ali ibn Abi'l-Husayn al-Kalbi, Ja'far and al-Hasan, when their father was killed in 938. After al-Hasan distinguished himself in the suppression of the revolt of Abu Yazid, in 948 he became governor of Sicily. He restored control over the island and became the first in a line of Kalbid emirs, who ruled the island under Fatimid suzerainty.

== Under al-Mu'izz ==
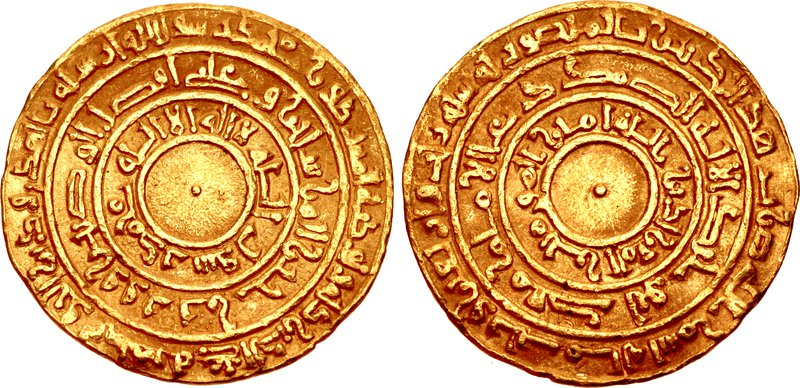
Gold dinar of al-Mu'izz, minted at al-Mansuriya in 954/5

Al-Mansur was plagued by illness, which would result in his death in March 953, at the age of 39. His son and successor, al-Mu'izz (r. 953–975) also relied on Jawdhar for consolidating his regime. As part of this, Jawdhar was allowed to move to the new capital built by al-Mansur, al-Mansuriya—apparently, Jawdhar had remained at al-Mahdiya until then, and state business was conducted via correspondence. Nevertheless, Jawdhar remained responsible for the continued house arrest of the al-Mansur's brothers and uncles in the palace at al-Mahdiya, while the letters preserved in his memoirs shows him continuing to direct the affairs of the mint and textile factories, the arsenal, the prisons, and the treasury at al-Mahdiya. Jawdhar was also active as a commercial agent on behalf of the caliph, amassing a considerable personal fortune in the process. Thanks to his ties with the Kalbids, Jawdhar was particularly active in trade with Sicily, owning his own ships, and being able to borrow money from the Kalbid treasury.

After the Fatimid conquest of Egypt in 969, Jawdhar was responsible for preparing the fleet and the caravans that would help move the Fatimid court—including the long-imprisoned members of the dynasty—and its possessions to Egypt. He also provided al-Mu'izz with 122,000 gold dinars from his own purse to support the Fatimids' takeover of Egypt, possibly when reinforcements under Hasan ibn Ammar were sent into the country in 971 to confront a Qarmatian invasion. At about the same time, Jawdhar was also entrusted with the fact that al-Mu'izz's second son, Abdallah, had been chosen as heir instead of the older Tamim. This happened after Jawdhar uncovered possibly treasonous correspondence with the uncles and great-uncles of al-Mu'izz still held at al-Mahdiya. During a ceremony welcoming Jawdhar back from al-Mahdiya, in the presence of the assembled members of the Fatimid dynasty, Jawdhar dismounted and kissed Abdallah's foot, thereby revealing his status as heir.

Although the chief aide of three successive caliphs, and the "most eminent statesman of the early Fatimid period", Jawdhar lacked popularity and political allies in Ifriqiya. This ruled him out as candidate for the position of Fatimid viceroy of Ifriqiya following the court's departure, although in his own memoirs, Jawdhar insists that he begged al-Mu'izz to not appoint him, since "his happiness lay in being at the side of the imam". Instead, the two most likely candidates were Buluggin ibn Ziri, chief of the Sanhaja Berbers, and his rival, the long-time governor of the Zab province at al-Masila, Ja'far ibn Ali ibn Hamdun al-Andalusi, who had aligned himself with the Zenata Berbers. Ja'far was close to Jawdhar, having been raised by him as a child, and had been a companion of al-Mu'izz, but in early 971 Jawdhar accused him of failing to remit the agreed taxes to the treasury, and of harbouring agents of the Umayyads of Cordoba. Rather than present himself at court as ordered, Ja'far defected to the Umayyads. As a result, Yusuf ibn Ziri was appointed as viceroy of Ifriqiya.

Jawdhar accompanied al-Mu'izz when he set out for Egypt in late 972, although he was heavily ill, and is reported to have had swollen feet. He died on the road at Barqa in March 973. The famous scholar Qadi al-Nu'man recited his burial rites, and he was buried at a local mosque. Some of his clients, who bore the nisba 'al-Jawdhari', established a quarter in Cairo bearing his name (al-Judariyya), that survives to this day.

== Memoirs ==
After his death, his private secretary, Abu Ali Mansur al-Azizi al-Jawdhari, compiled his papers and recollections into the Sirat al-Ustadh Jawdhar. Along with the work of al-Qadi al-Nu'man, the Sirat al-Ustadh Jawdhar is one of the main sources for Fatimid history under the first four Fatimid caliphs. Three modern editions of this work exist:

- سيرة الأستاذ جوذر, in Arabic, edited by Muhammad Kamil Husayn and Muhammad Abd al-Hadi Sha'ira (Dar al-Fikr al-Arabi, Cairo 1954).
- Vie de l’ustadh Jaudhar (contenant sermons, lettres et rescrits des premiers califes Fâtimides), a French translation by Marius Canard (La Typo-Litho et J. Carbonel, Algiers 1958).
- Inside the Immaculate Portal: A History from Early Fatimid Archives. A new edition and English translation of Manṣūr al-ʿAzīzī al-Jawdharī’s biography of al-Ustādh Jawdhar, the Sīrat al-Ustādh Jawdhar , English translation and critical edition by Hamid Haji (I.B. Tauris in association with the Institute of Ismaili Studies, 2012).

== Sources ==
- Brett, Michael (2001). The Rise of the Fatimids: The World of the Mediterranean and the Middle East in the Fourth Century of the Hijra, Tenth Century CE. The Medieval Mediterranean. Vol. 30. Leiden: BRILL. ISBN 90-04-11741-5.
- Brett, Michael (2017). The Fatimid Empire. The Edinburgh History of the Islamic Empires. Edinburgh: Edinburgh University Press. ISBN 978-0-7486-4076-8.
- Dachraoui, Farhat (1981). Le Califat Fatimide au Maghreb (296-365 H. / 909-975 Jc.). Historie Politique et Institutions [The Fatimid Caliphate in the Maghreb (296-365 AH / 909-975 CE). Political History and Institutions] (PhD thesis) (in French). Tunis.
- Daftary, Farhad (2004). Ismaili Literature: A Bibliography of Sources and Studies. London and New York: I.B. Tauris. ISBN 978-0-8577-1386-5.
- Haji, Hamid (2011). "A Distinguished Slav Eunuch of the Early Fatimid Period: al-Ustādh Jawdhar". In Ali-de-Unzaga, Omar (ed.). Fortresses of the Intellect: Ismaili and Other Islamic Studies in Honour of Farhad Daftary. London and New York: I.B. Tauris. pp. 261–274. ISBN 978-1-84885-626-4.
- Halm, Heinz (1991). Das Reich des Mahdi: Der Aufstieg der Fatimiden [The Empire of the Mahdi: The Rise of the Fatimids] (in German). Munich: C. H. Beck. ISBN 978-3-406-35497-7.
