= Fallah ibn Marwan =

- ⴼⴰⵍⵍⴰⵀ ⴱⵏ ⵎⵔⵡⴰⵏ
- Born: 9th century Djimla, Kutama country
- Died: September or October 956; Fatimid Caliphate
- Office: Governor of Cyrenaica and Tripoli and Beja
- Children: Ja'far ibn Fallah
- Father: Marwan Abu Marzuq
- Relatives: Qutb al-Dawla (grandson) Marzuq (brother)

Fallah ibn Marwan (Berber: ⴼⴰⵍⵍⴰⵀ ⴱⵏ ⵎⵔⵡⴰⵏ), also known as Fallah ibn Marwan Abu Marzuq al-Kutami, was a Berber Fatimid leader and governor from the Kutama tribe. He was the father of Ja'far ibn Fallah.

== Biography ==
The only narrative to mention Fallah bin Marwan is al-Maqrizi's major historical work titled al-Muqaffa al-Kabir. Al-Maqrizi described him as an illustrious commander who governed Tripoli, Cyrenaica, and Beja, and was known for his righteous conduct toward his subjects. He passed away in Rajab in the year 345 AH. His son, Ja’far, was raised in the Maghreb in the service of al-Mu’izz li-Din Allah. He is one of the "two Ja’fars" to whom the Andalusian poet Ibn Hani was directed. When Ibn Hani praised the commander Jawhar, he was given two hundred dirhams; finding the sum meager, he inquired about a generous man to eulogize. He was told: "You must seek one of the two Ja’fars: Ja’far ibn Fallah or Ja’far bin Ali bin Hamdun, known as Ibn al-Andalusiyya." He subsequently praised Ja’far ibn Fallah, who rewarded him with two hundred dinars.

== See also ==
- Kutama
- Fatimid Caliphate
- Ja'far ibn Fallah
- Djimla
- Cyrenaica
- Fatimid conquest of Cyrenaica
- Tripoli
- Beja
