= Ali ibn Hamdun al-Andalusi =

10th-century Fatimid governor

Ali ibn Hamdun al-Andalusi was an early adherent of Isma'ilism and of the Fatimid Caliphate. He was the founder and governor of the city of M'Sila, and the progenitor of a line of governors and generals in the service of the Fatimid and Umayyad rulers.

== Life ==
Ali was born with the name Tha'laba, to a family descending from Abd al-Hamid al-Judhami, a member of the Syrian regiments of the Umayyad Caliphate who had settled in al-Andalus, in the region of Alcalá la Real. Ali's father, Hamdun, had moved the family to Béjaïa in what is now northeastern Algeria, where the family acquired the Nisba of al-Andalusi.

In 900, Ali decided to go on the Hajj pilgrimage, but on the way, as he was passing through the lands of the Kutama Berbers, he was impressed by the Isma'ili message being propagated by Abu Abdallah al-Shi'i. He stayed there, married a Kutama woman named Maymuna bint Alaham al-Jili, and changed his name from Tha'laba to Ali. After the establishment of the Fatimid Caliphate in 909, he became one of the closest advisors of the new caliph, Abd Allah al-Mahdi Billah. In 924, during the campaign by al-Mahdi's heir-apparent, al-Qa'im against the Zenata Berbers, Ali was given the task of establishing a new city on the plain between the Hodna Mountains and the Chott el Hodna lake. The city, named al-Muhammadiya (modern M'Sila) after al-Qa'im, was established to solidify Fatimid's control and to serve as a base for cultivating the once rich Hodna plain.

Ali and his family settled in the new city, becoming its governors and assuming, in the words of the historian Heinz Halm, "the role of margraves" at the southwestern extremity of the Fatimid territory against the Zenata. Ali ibn Hamdun remained loyal to the Fatimid cause during the great revolt of Abu Yazid (944–947). In late 945, Hamdun led his men towards Béja, but was defeated and mortally wounded in battle against Abu Yazid's son, Ayyub.

Hamdun was succeeded by his son, Ja'far, who along with his brother Yahya played a major role in the conflict between the Fatimids and the Umayyad Caliphate of Córdoba in subsequent decades, defecting to the latter in 971.

== Sources ==
- Halm, Heinz (1991). Das Reich des Mahdi: Der Aufstieg der Fatimiden [The Empire of the Mahdi: The Rise of the Fatimids] (in German). Munich: C. H. Beck. ISBN 978-3-406-35497-7.
- Manzano, Eduardo (2019). La corte del califa: Cuatro años en la Córdoba de los omeyas [The Court of the Caliph: Four Years in Umayyad Córdoba] (in Spanish). Barcelona: Editorial Crítica. ISBN 978-8-49199028-4.
