= Al-Mansur Billah =

Fatimid ruler (r. 946–953) and 13th Ismaili Imam

al-Mansur Billah المنصور بالله
- Caliph; Amir al-Mu'minīn
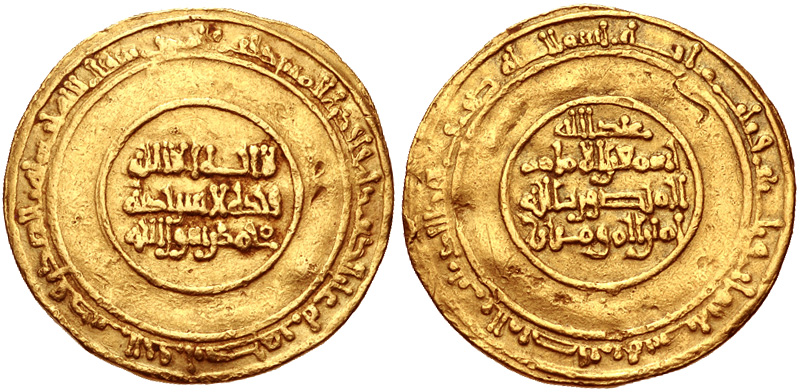
- Gold dinar of al-Mansur, minted at his new capital, al-Mansuriya, in 949/50

Imam–Caliph of the Fatimid Caliphate
- Reign: 17 May 946 – 18 March 953
- Predecessor: al-Qa'im bi-Amr Allah
- Successor: al-Mu'izz li-Din Allah
- Born: January 914; Raqqada, Fatimid caliphate
- Died: 18 March 953 (aged 39)
- Issue: al-Mu'izz li-Din Allah
Names
- Kunya: Abu Tahir; Given name: Isma'il; Laqab: al-Mansur Billah
- Dynasty: Fatimid
- Father: al-Qa'im bi-Amr Allah
- Mother: Karima
- Religion: Isma'ili Shia Islam

Abu Tahir Isma'il (Arabic: أبو طاهر إسماعيل, romanized: Abū Ṭāhir ʾIsmāʿīl; January 914 – 18 March 953), better known by his regnal name al-Mansur Billah (Arabic: المنصور بالله, romanized: al-Manṣūr biʾllāh, lit. 'The Victor through God'), was the thirteenth Isma'ili imam and third caliph of the Fatimid Caliphate in Ifriqiya, ruling from 946 until his death. He succeeded his father, al-Qa'im, after the latter's death, in what was likely a bloodless palace coup. At the time of al-Mansur's accession, most of the Fatimid mainland realm in Ifriqiya had been lost to a large-scale anti-Fatimid revolt led by the Kharijite preacher Abu Yazid, who was laying siege to al-Qa'im's fortified coastal palace city of al-Mahdiya. Unlike his father he was an active and publicly visible monarch, but plagued by illness, which led to his early death.

Al-Mansur immediately took up the fight against the revolt with considerable energy, but kept his father's death secret until after the final suppression of the rebellion, governing instead as the ostensible designated successor and "Sword of the Imam". Leaving the trusted eunuch chamberlain Jawdhar to run the government in his stead, al-Mansur took to the field in person, leading the Fatimid army to victory over the rebel army outside Kairouan, and pursuing its remnants into the Hodna Mountains. After a long pursuit, Abu Yazid was finally cornered and captured, before dying of his injuries on 19 August 947. After Abu Yazid's death, al-Mansur publicly proclaimed his caliphate. His victory over Abu Yazid was celebrated as a triumph over a 'False Messiah', and as heralding a new beginning for the dynasty and its divine mission. Al-Mansur spent the remainder of his reign in al-Mansuriya, a new capital city he founded in 948. During his reign, he also secured the allegiance of the Sanhaja Berbers under Ziri ibn Manad, recaptured Tahert from the rebellious Miknasa Berbers, suppressed a revolt in the overseas Fatimid province of Sicily, launched naval raids against Byzantine holdings in southern Italy, and engaged in a mounting antagonism with the rival Umayyad state of Córdoba.

== Early life and accession ==
The future al-Mansur was born Isma'il, in early January 914, in the palace city of Raqqada near Kairouan. He was the son of the then heir-apparent and future second Fatimid imam–caliph, Muhammad al-Qa'im bi-Amr Allah (r. 934–946), and a local slave concubine, Karima, who had once belonged to the last Aghlabid emir of Ifriqiya, Ziyadat Allah III. Isma'il was not the oldest son of al-Qa'im, but the firstborn, al-Qasim, reportedly predeceased his father.

According to the official version of events, on 12 April 946, al-Qa'im publicly proclaimed Isma'il as his heir, with the regnal name of al-Mansur Billah, and when he died on 17 May, al-Mansur became imam and caliph. Modern historians of the Fatimid period, such as Heinz Halm and Michael Brett, suspect that al-Mansur's rise to power was the result of a palace intrigue headed by the influential slave chamberlain Jawdhar, with the participation of other figures from al-Qa'im's harem. His mother, Karima, and his wet nurse, Salaf, are known to have aided him in his power struggle against his half-brothers, and are described as one of few women to have participated in political affairs. Several factors suggest this: given al-Qa'im's debilitating illness, it is unclear whether he was at all capable of proclaiming a successor; the first act of the new caliph was to confine his uncles and brothers to house arrest in the palace, under the supervision of Jawdhar; Jawdhar, in his memoirs, claims that Isma'il had been secretly nominated as father's heir already at the time of al-Qa'im's own accession in 934, with Jawdhar himself being the only one entrusted his secret; and al-Mansur himself was apparently obliged to compose a tract defending his succession, which points to the contested nature of his accession.

== Reign ==
=== Suppression of the rebellion of Abu Yazid ===
At the time of his accession, the Fatimid Caliphate was undergoing one of its most critical moments: a large-scale rebellion under the Kharijite Berber preacher Abu Yazid had overrun Ifriqiya and was threatening the capital al-Mahdiya itself. As a result, in the words of the historian Farhat Dachraoui, "[al-Mansur] had to face up to, immediately, the heaviest responsibilities without having served any apprenticeship as ruler". Al-Mansur would prove up to the task: both Isma'ili (pro-Fatimid) and Sunni (anti-Fatimid) sources agree that al-Mansur was an exemplary ruler, praising both his erudition and eloquence in Classical Arabic as well as his bravery and energetic leadership in battle.

While the revolt of Abu Yazid lasted, al-Mansur and his government kept the death of his father secret. All public business and ceremonies were still conducted in al-Qa'im's name, and Isma'il acted ostensibly only as his designated heir. Indeed, the regnal name of al-Mansur was only publicly assumed after the final suppression of the uprising. Nevertheless, the new ruler quickly showed his ability. Already before his father's death, on 16 May, he sent by sea weapons and supplies to the besieged city of Sousse, and within days launched a coordinated attack to relieve the city: on 26 May, the garrison of Sousse, assisted by Kutama Berber cavalry from the south and troops landed by sea from the north, broke the siege and forced Abu Yazid to withdraw his forces inland, towards Kairouan.

==== Battle for Kairouan ====
Abu Yazid found Kairouan in rebellion against him and the city gates closed, so that he established a camp two days' march from the city. In the meantime, al-Mansur had met with a delegation of Kairouan notables at Sousse, and issued a full amnesty in return for their renewed loyalty. On 28 May, the caliph's proclamation was read in the city, and on the same day the Fatimid army, headed by the caliph himself, set up camp south of the city. The Fatimid prince was forced to lead by example to convince the unruly Kutama to fortify the camp with a ditch and wall, since the Berbers considered this a sign of cowardice and regarded digging as slaves' work. Only after al-Mansur himself took the spade and began digging were they persuaded to help.

This proved fortunate, as Abu Yazid attacked the camp on the morning of 5 June, and was only thrown back with great difficulty. According to an eyewitness account, al-Mansur played a leading role in repelling the attack, his ceremonial parasol conspicuously displayed and serving as a rallying point, but it is possible that his role has been embellished to further legitimize his position. The two armies remained entrenched around Kairouan for the next two months, engaging in frequent clashes. Abu Yazid tried several times to take the city gates by assault, but al-Mansur had established smaller fortified camps to protect them. Abu Yazid tried to force the Fatimids to withdraw by sending his son to raid the environs of al-Mahdiya, where many of the Kutama had settled their families; but although al-Mansur sent some troops to shield them, he refused to move his main army.

While al-Mansur was slowly building up his numerically inferior forces with contingents from the remote provinces of the Fatimid empire, Abu Yazid's support began to dwindle, and his followers abandoned his camp. Only the Hawwara and Banu Kamlan Berbers remained steadfastly loyal to him. With increasing confidence, al-Mansur marched his army out to provoke a pitched battle, but Abu Yazid refused the challenge. Finally, on 13 August the Fatimids stormed the rebel camp, and Abu Yazid's troops broke and fled. The victory proved doubly fortuitous for al-Mansur. Seeking support against the Fatimids, Abu Yazid had made contact with the Spanish Umayyads and recognized the suzerainty of the Umayyad caliph Abd al-Rahman III. An Umayyad fleet had been dispatched to assist him, but when its commander heard news of the Fatimid victory at Kairouan, he turned back.

Even in his victory dispatch to the capital, read out by the chamberlain Jawdhar, al-Mansur upheld the fiction of the still living al-Qa'im, describing himself merely as the "Sword of the Imam". The Fatimid ruler set about achieving a reconciliation with the citizens of Kairouan: he abstained from re-appointing an Isma'ili qadi over the city, instead choosing the old and respected Malikite jurist Muhammad ibn Abi'l-Manzur; he did not appoint a Kutama as governor, but a military officer of Slavic origin, Qudam al-Fata; he remitted all taxes for two years; and offered much of the captured booty as alms to the city poor. At the same time, al-Mansur ordered that the site of his camp south of the city be made into a new palace city, known officially as al-Mansuriya and locally as Sabra. Aside from thus immortalizing his victory, the prospect of the caliphal residence returning to the vicinity of Kairouan, the old capital of Ifriqiya, was another sign of caliphal favour to the Kairouanese. While at Kairouan, on 18 October al-Mansur received an envoy of the Byzantine Empire. It is unknown what the envoy's business with the Caliph was, but it most likely concerned the renewal of a truce that was in effect in southern Italy, which suited both powers at the time.

==== Pursuit of Abu Yazid ====
While al-Mansur remained at Kairouan, in the north al-Hasan ibn Ali al-Kalbi had gathered fresh Kutama forces at Constantine and recaptured Béja and Tunis, securing the caliph's northern flank. Reinforced with a thousand cavalry from the Cyrenaica, al-Mansur set out from Kairouan on 24 October in the direction of Sbiba. From there the Fatimid army marched to Bajaya, which had resisted the rebels' attacks, and welcomed the Fatimid troops as liberators. Ibn Khazar, the leader of the Zenata Berbers, sent an envoy to declare his allegiance to al-Mansur. This in turn forced Abu Yazid to flee to the south and bypass the Zenata territories through the desert. Al-Mansur followed him until Biskra, but the local guides counseled against following the rebel leader, as the route was dangerous for an army. At Biskra, the governor of Msila and the Zab region, Ja'far ibn Ali ibn Hamdun, presented himself to the caliph in submission, bringing with him a youth who was being hailed as a prophet in the Aurès region. After parading him through the camp, al-Mansur had the youth skinned alive and stuffed.

When the caliph learned that Abu Yazid had found refuge in the Jabal Salat mountains, west of the Chott el Hodna lake, he led his army north to Tubna and then west, along the northern shore of Chott el Hodna. Abu Yazid confronted the Fatimid army at the town of Magra on 9 December, but was defeated. Following the victory, delegations from the tribes and settlements of the region began arriving at Msila to declare their loyalty to al-Mansur, including Ibn Khazar's son, Ya'qub. Shortly after, Abu Yazid launched an attack on al-Mansur's army camp near Msila, but was again beaten back. Al-Mansur sent his troops into the Hodna Mountains to pursue the rebel, but Abu Yazid again fled to the Jabal Salat. When the Fatimid troops pursued him there, he again fled to the desert, and this time al-Mansur was determined to follow him. After a grueling eleven-day march in the desert he was forced to turn back, only for the heavy winter to take further toll on his army.

Barred from following Abu Yazid, al-Mansur instead turned north, to the territory of the Sanhaja Berbers, whose leader, Ziri ibn Manad, had once submitted to Caliph al-Qa'im. Ziri came forth and presented himself in person to the Fatimid ruler, and was richly rewarded. After giving the command to turn back east, al-Mansur fell heavily ill to a fever on 10 January 947, and remained bedridden for a fortnight. Following his recovery, he made for Msila. Abu Yazid had now settled in the ruined fortress of Azbih (the Byzantine-era Zabi Iustiniana) near Msila. Al-Mansur sent orders for fresh Kutama levies to be undertaken in their homelands in Lesser Kabylia, while Ibn Khazar repeated his protestations of loyalty, which included asking for the proper formula to be used in the sermon (khutba) of the Friday prayer and the coinage. This request signalled the final acceptance of Fatimid sovereignty by the Zenata. The adherence of the Zenata also meant that Abu Yazid was cut off from supplies. On 6 March, al-Mansur, accompanied by 4,000 of his own cavalry and 500 Sanhaja, set out for Azbih. They found the fortress deserted, but as they turned back, the rear guard was suddenly attacked by Abu Yazid and his men. In the ensuing battle, the Fatimid ruler again prevailed, and Abu Yazid, wounded, barely managed to escape. Along with his letter announcing his victory, al-Mansur sent 1,070 severed heads of rebels to Kairouan.

==== Siege of Kiyana and death of Abu Yazid ====
Abu Yazid fled once more to the Hodna Mountains, and al-Mansur pursued him there. The Fatimid troops pursued the rebel leader relentlessly over the narrow mountain paths. Abu Yazid's camp was captured and torched, but he managed to find refuge in the fortress of Kiyana (close to where Beni Hammad Fort was later built). Al-Mansur did not immediately attack him there, but first awaited further Kutama levies. He then set about methodically subduing the mountains, thus preventing Abu Yazid from finding refuge should he again manage to escape. Only following the end of Ramadan, on 26 April, did he move against the fortress, amidst torrential rain.

Located on a steep rock on a mountain plateau, Kiyana was placed under siege, with siege engines shipped from Ifriqiya over sea and carried over the mountains. The defenders tried repeatedly to break the siege with sallies, but were pushed back every time. In early June, the neighbouring fortresses of Shakir and Aqqar, also held by the rebels, surrendered, and on 14 August 947, the final attack on Kiyana was launched. Dressed in gold-embroidered red clothes, al-Mansur participated in the combat in person, atop his horse. After bitter fighting, around noon the fortress was breached, and the last defenders withdrew to a keep. Al-Mansur offered a pardon if they would hand over Abu Yazid, but they refused. At dawn on the next day, the besieged tried to break through to safety, but were once again defeated. Abu Yazid managed to escape, but fell in a ravine and was captured. Heavily wounded, he was interrogated by the caliph, before dying of his injuries after four days, on 19 August. His skin was salted and stuffed, to be paraded in public in every town the victorious caliph passed on his way back.

Abu Yazid's defeat was a watershed moment for the Fatimid dynasty. As the historian Michael Brett comments, "in life, Abu Yazid had brought the [Fatimid] dynasty to the brink of destruction; in death he was a godsend", as it allowed the dynasty to relaunch itself following the failures of al-Qa'im's reign. For this purpose, Abu Yazid was immortalized in Fatimid historiography as nothing less than a 'False Messiah' (al-Masīḥ al-Dajjāl), and his rebellion conceived as an apocalyptic event that had been foreseen by al-Mahdi, for which purpose he had constructed al-Mahdiyya, "as a refuge for the dynasty from the great enemy, and a citadel from which the whole world would then be conquered". The victory over the uprising was thus cast as a veritable resurrection of the dynasty. On the very day of Abu Yazid's death, al-Mansur declared himself as the imam and caliph, and publicly assumed his regnal title of al-Manṣūr bi-Naṣr Allāh, 'The Victor with the Help of God'.

=== Consolidation of Fatimid rule in the Maghreb ===
During the army's return to Msila, they were attacked by some Zenata who had refused to submit along with their leader Ibn Khazar. According to Heinz Halm, this was "the last uprising against Fatimid rule in the central Maghreb". Even Abu Yazid's most determined partisans, the Banu Kamlan, soon submitted to Fatimid authority in exchange for a pardon.

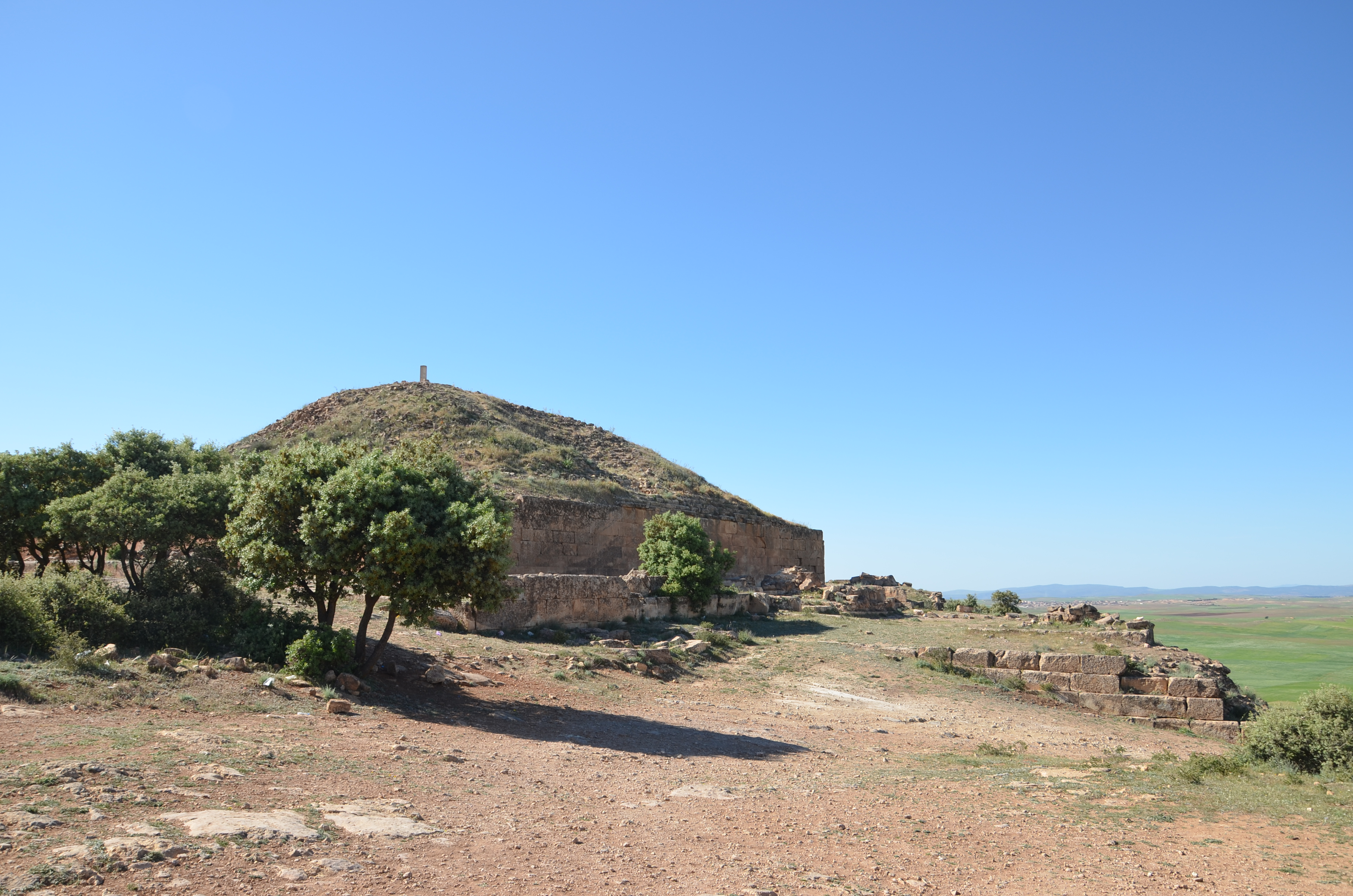
One of the Jedars, visited by al-Mansur during his sojourn in Tahert in 947

Al-Mansur now intended to head back east, but was thwarted when news arrived of the loss of Tahert. The city had been conquered by the Fatimids already in 909, but was only tenuously held, under the semi-autonomous rule of the leaders of the Berber Miknasa tribe. One of them, Hamid ibn Yasal, had been imprisoned by al-Qa'im in al-Mahdiya, but managed to escape to the Umayyad court. With their aid, he had sailed back to the Maghreb and taken over Tahert on behalf of Abd al-Rahman III. The Fatimid caliph set out from Msila on 7 September to recover the city, but when he arrived at Tahert on the 20th, he found Hamid gone: he and his followers had sailed back to Spain. In retaliation, the caliph dug out the bones of his relatives and had them and the minbar of the mosque, from which the Friday prayer had been read in the name of his Umayyad rival, burned. While at Tahert, al-Mansur again fell heavily ill and was close to death, even to the point of having his last will written up. After recovering, he led an expedition against the Luwata Berbers, but as the latter retreated into the desert, it failed to achieve anything. The caliph also spent some time sightseeing, visiting the waterfalls at Oued Tiguiguest, and the Jedars, the late antique tumuli of Oued Mina. In the latter place, he had an inscription erected by Solomon, a general of the 6th-century Byzantine emperor Justinian I, translated for him. (Note: This visit appears to have awakened an interest in the Roman antiquities of Ifriqiya in al-Mansur: he is recorded to have visited the Roman remains at Sitifis and Carthage, and especially the Zaghouan Aqueduct.)

Leaving the court eunuch Masrur as governor in Tahert, he set out on the return journey east on 2 January 948. Eleven days later he entered his new capital, al-Mansuriya, in triumph, through the 'Gate of Victories' (bāb al-futūḥ). On 14 February, he left al-Mahdiya to confront Abu Yazid's son Fadl, who was still resisting the Fatimids in the Aurès Mountains. The caliphal army marched through Sbeitla to Gafsa, with the rebels withdrawing before them without giving combat and retreating to their bases in the Aurès. The campaign was apparently chiefly designed to bolster the credentials of al-Mansur's designated heir, Ma'add (the future al-Mu'izz li-Din Allah), so after sacking the fortress of Midès and laying waste to its environs, in which the Fatimid prince suitably distinguished himself, the army returned to yet another triumphal entry into al-Mansuriya on 28 March. Soon after, the court left the new capital, which was not yet completed, for al-Mahdiya, where al-Mansur celebrated Eid al-Fitr on 13 April for the first time as caliph, with extensive pomp. In his sermon in the mosque, al-Mansur publicly interpreted his victory over the 'False Messiah' as a sign of divine favour, remarking that God "wishes to renew and strengthen our dynasty". As a sign of his new confidence, al-Mansur at this time released twenty members of the Aghlabid dynasty, who had been held prisoners since 909. They were given rich presents and allowed to leave for Egypt.

In the meantime, Abu Yazid's son Fadl was killed through treachery by the governor of Mdila. His severed head was dispatched to the caliph, who sent it together with the stuffed skin of his father to Sicily. The ship sank, but Abu Yazid's corpse was washed ashore at al-Mahdiya, where it was crucified and publicly displayed. Abu Yazid's other sons, Yazid and Ayyub, tried to continue the resistance in the Aurès, but they too were soon after killed.

=== Revolt in Sicily and relations with Byzantium and the Umayyads ===
On 25 April 947, a revolt led by the Banu al-Tabari family in Palermo deposed the Fatimid governor of Sicily, Ibn Attaf. The rebels held Ibn Attaf to be too weak and passive against the Byzantines in southern Italy, allowing the latter to stop paying the agreed-upon tribute in exchange for the truce. This was a major grievance for the leading Sicilian Arab clans, who depended on the tribute in the absence of opportunities to gather plunder through raids.

To deal with the uprising, al-Mansur chose a man who had distinguished himself in the suppression of Abu Yazid's revolt, the governor of Tunis, al-Hasan ibn Ali al-Kalbi, who was appointed as the new governor of Sicily. When he arrived at al-Mansuriya in January 948, he brought with him the Byzantine strategos of Calabria. His mission is unclear, but likely the Byzantines were anxious to renew the truce, which was being threatened by events in Sicily, where the new dominant faction might relaunch raids against them in the name of jihad, seeking plunder. In spring 948, al-Hasan al-Kalbi arrived at Mazara with a fleet and an army, while unbeknownst to him, the rebels sent a delegation to petition a new governor from al-Mansur. Once al-Kalbi arrived in Sicily, he was informed of the delegation's mission, but marched on Palermo nonetheless. The rebels quickly lost support, and the leading notables surrendered the city to him without battle. Al-Kalbi imprisoned the leaders of the rebels, as did al-Mansur with the rebel delegation in Ifriqiya. The swift restoration of Fatimid control over Sicily also appears to have brought a renewal of the truce with Byzantium for three years, and likely the payment of the arrears in tribute. Al-Hasan al-Kalbi would become the first of a series of Kalbid governors of the island, who would rule it as Fatimid viceroys until 1053.

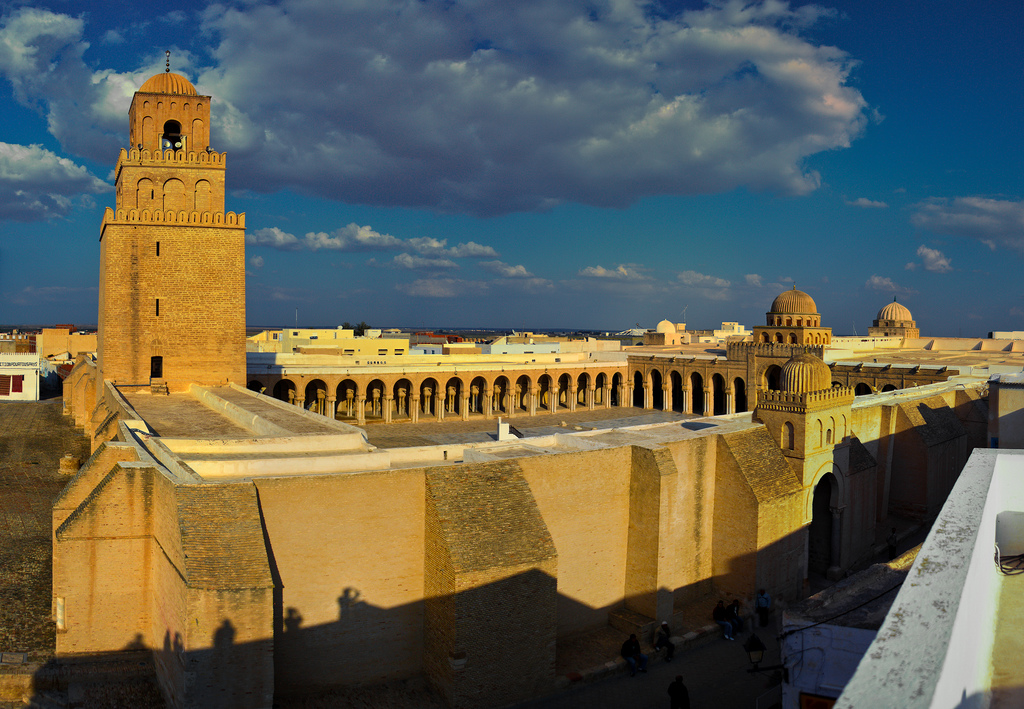
Great Mosque of Kairouan

In early September 948, the Fatimid court moved to al-Mansuriya, which now became the official caliphal residence. The state mint, treasury, and clothing factories remained behind at al-Mahidya, under the supervision of Jawdhar. As the mosque of the new capital was unfinished, al-Mansur became the only Fatimid caliph to pray and hold the Friday prayer at the Great Mosque of Kairouan.

The truce with Byzantium did not last long. In 949, the Byzantines and Umayyads exchanged embassies to their respective courts, and apparently agreed on an anti-Fatimid league: in the following summer, the Byzantines attacked Fatimid positions in southern Italy, while in 951 the Umayyad fleet captured Tangier, giving the Umayyad court another base (along with Ceuta) with which to exert influence on the tribes and rulers of the western Maghreb and promote an anti-Fatimid coalition among them. Learning of the arrival of fresh Byzantine troops in Italy, al-Hasal al-Kalbi sought reinforcements from Ifriqiya. Al-Mansur supervised the preparations at Tunis in person, putting the expeditionary force of 10,500 men under the command of the Slavic eunuch Faraj (or Farakh).

In May 951, the Fatimids landed near Rhegion and attacked Gerace without success, leaving after a payment of tribute, once the Byzantine relief army approached the town. The same was repeated at Cassano, before al-Hasan al-Kalbi and Faraj led their forces back to Sicily, to winter quarters in Messina. Although the Byzantines also withdrew their forces to Apulia, this enraged al-Mansur, who berated his commanders for their timidity. Obeying the caliph's orders, the next spring, the two Fatimid commanders again landed in Calabria. On 7 May, the Fatimids dealt a heavy defeat on the Byzantine army under Malakenos and Paschalis near Gerace, and proceeded to sack both it and Petracucca. As a result, the Byzantines offered to renew the truce against the payment of a tribute. As a sign of his success, al-Hasan al-Kalbi erected a mosque in Reggio, and obliged the Byzantines to not allow any Muslim to use it and to seek refuge and asylum there.

== Death and legacy ==
Al-Mansur spent most of his reign in recurring bouts of heavy illness, that at times led him to the brink of death. Nevertheless, he continued to be active in government, and, in marked contrast to his father, to show himself in public events and festivals, until the end of his life. The last such occasion was on 19 February 953, when he led the ceremonies for the Eid al-Fitr, reciting in person the prayer at Kairouan. He died on 19 March, leaving his realm to his son Ma'ad, who became caliph as al-Mu'izz li-Din Allah (r. 953–975).

Al-Mansur's life, first as impotent heir-apparent and then as a stoically suffering ruler, was exalted in later Isma'ili teachings as an exemplar and as a sacrifice that redeemed the faithful. At the same time, his tumultuous life and untimely death kindled popular imagination. As the historian Heinz Halm remarks, "if al-Mansur comes off just as badly as the other Fatimids in the books of the intransigent Malikis, the youthful victor over the terrible hordes of Abu Yazid still appears to have been popular with the inhabitants of Kairouan, and for the first time to have achieved something like loyalty towards his house".

== Sources ==
- Brett, Michael (2001). The Rise of the Fatimids: The World of the Mediterranean and the Middle East in the Fourth Century of the Hijra, Tenth Century CE. The Medieval Mediterranean. Vol. 30. Leiden: BRILL. ISBN 978-90-04-11741-9.
- Brett, Michael (2017). The Fatimid Empire. The Edinburgh History of the Islamic Empires. Edinburgh: Edinburgh University Press. ISBN 978-0-7486-4076-8.
- Dachraoui, F. (1991). "al-Manṣūr Bi'llāh". In Bosworth, C. E.; van Donzel, E. & Pellat, Ch. (eds.). The Encyclopaedia of Islam, Second Edition. Volume VI: Mahk–Mid. Leiden: E. J. Brill. pp. 434–435. ISBN 978-90-04-08112-3.
- Daftary, Farhad (2007). The Ismāʿı̄lı̄s: Their History and Doctrines (Second ed.). Cambridge: Cambridge University Press. ISBN 978-0-521-61636-2.
- Halm, Heinz (1991). Das Reich des Mahdi: Der Aufstieg der Fatimiden [The Empire of the Mahdi: The Rise of the Fatimids] (in German). Munich: C. H. Beck. ISBN 978-3-406-35497-7.
- Lev, Yaacov (1984). "The Fāṭimid Navy, Byzantium and the Mediterranean Sea, 909–1036 CE/297–427 AH". Byzantion: Revue internationale des études byzantines. 54 (1): 220–252. ISSN 0378-2506. JSTOR 44170866.
- Madelung, Wilferd (2003). "A Treatise on the Imamate of the Fatimid Caliph Al-Manṣūr Bi-Allāh". In Robinson, Chase F. (ed.). Texts, Documents and Artefacts: Islamic Studies in Honour of D.S. Richards. Islamic History and Civilization. Vol. 45. Leiden: Brill. pp. 69–77. doi:10.1163/9789047401797_007. ISBN 978-90-04-12864-4.
- Metcalfe, Alex (2009). The Muslims of Medieval Italy. Edinburgh: Edinburgh University Press. ISBN 978-0-7486-2008-1.
- Stern, S. M. (1960). "Abū Yazīd Mak̲h̲lad b. Kaydād al-Nukkārī". In Gibb, H. A. R.; Kramers, J. H.; Lévi-Provençal, E.; Schacht, J.; Lewis, B. & Pellat, Ch. (eds.). The Encyclopaedia of Islam, Second Edition. Volume I: A–B. Leiden: E. J. Brill. pp. 163–164. OCLC 495469456.

al-Mansur bi-Nasr Allah Fatimid dynasty Born: January 914 Died: 19 March 953
Regnal titles
Preceded by al-Qa'im bi-Amr Allah	Fatimid Caliph; 17 May 946 – 18 March 953	Succeeded by al-Mu'izz li-Din Allah
Shia Islam titles
Preceded by al-Qa'im bi-Amr Allah	13th Isma'ili Imam; 17 May 946 – 18 March 953	Succeeded by al-Mu'izz li-Din Allah
