= Mansouria, Tunisia =

El-Mansuriya المنصورية
- Location within Tunisia
- Coordinates: 35°39′29″N 10°06′50″E
- Country: Ifriqiya
- Established: 948–1057
- Founded by: Ismail al-Mansur

El-Mansuriya (Note: The name Mansuriya means "the victorious", after its founder Abu Tahir Ismail, who assumed the regnal name al-Mansur bi-Nasr Allah, "the victor.") or Mansuriya (Arabic: المنصورية), also known as Sabra or Sabra al-Mansuriyya, near Kairouan, Tunisia, was the capital of the Fatimid Caliphate during the rule of the Ismaili Imams al-Mansur bi-Nasr Allah (r. 946–953) and al-Mu'izz li-Din Allah (r. 953–975).

Built between 946 and 972, el-Mansuriya was a walled city holding elaborate palaces surrounded by gardens, artificial pools and water channels. It was briefly the centre of a powerful state that encompassed most of North Africa and Sicily. It continued to serve as provincial capital of the Zirids until 1057, when it was destroyed by the invading Banu Hilal tribes. Any useful objects or relics were scavenged during the centuries that followed. Today, only faint traces remain.

== Background ==
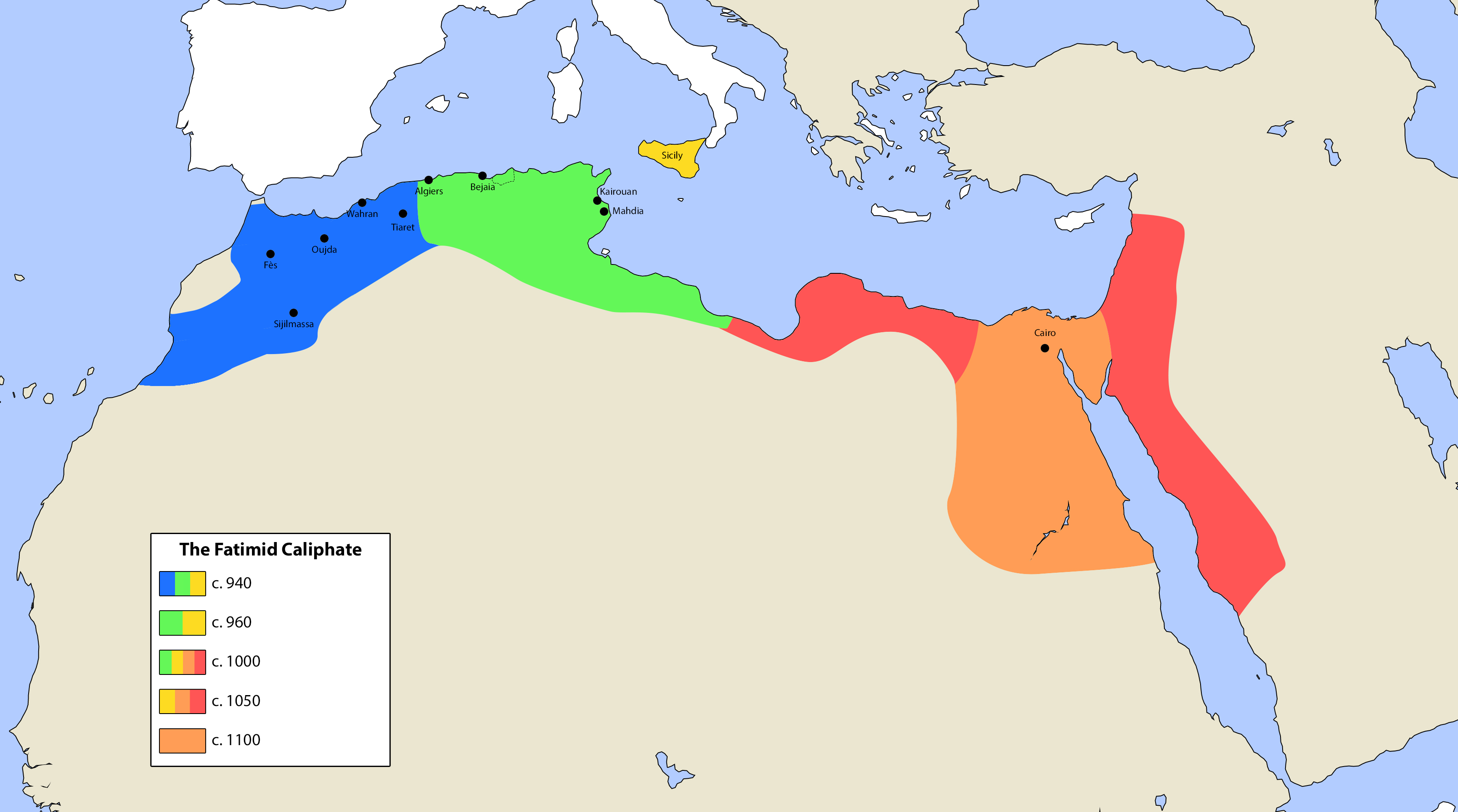
Successive extensions of the Fatimid caliphate

The Fatimid Caliphate originated in an Ismaili Shia movement launched in Syria by Abd Allah al-Akbar. He claimed descent through Ismail, the seventh Shia imam, from the Islamic prophet Muhammad's daughter Fatimah. The Fatimid Dynasty is named after Fatimah. In 899 Abdullah al-Mahdi Billah became leader of the movement. He fled from his enemies to Sijilmasa in Morocco, where he proselytized under the guise of being a merchant. El-Mahdi was supported by a nobleman named Abu Abdullah al-Shi'i, who organized a Berber uprising that overthrew the Tunisian Aghlabid dynasty, and then invited el-Mahdi to assume the position of imam and caliph. A new capital was established at Mahdia. The Fatimid Caliphate grew to include Sicily and to stretch across North Africa from the Atlantic Ocean to Libya.

The third Fatimid caliph in Ifriqiya was al-Mansur bi-Nasr Allah, an Ismaili Shia leader. He was invested as Imam on 12 April 946 in el-Mahdia, five weeks before his father died in great pain. He took the name el-Mansur, "the victor." At the time, el-Mahdia was under siege by the Kharidji rebel Abu Yazid. El-Mansur launched his campaign against Abu Yazid, and by August 946 had gained the upper hand in the battle for control of Kairouan. After his victory, he decided to found his new capital city at the site of his camp in the battle, just south of Kairouan. He laid out the plan immediately after the battle, in 946, although it would take another year of struggle before Abu Yazid was finally defeated.

== Construction ==
El-Mansuriya was located less than 2 kilometres (1.2 mi) south of the existing city of Kairouan. It replaced el-Mahdia as the capital of the empire. El-Mansur moved to the new city in 948. The Kharijite rebels had destroyed the Aghlabid city of Raqqada, and building materials were taken from this old residence. The new city covered an area of about 100 hectares (250 acres).

The city was circular, as was the original Baghdad, and the choice of layout may have been intended as a challenge to the Sunni Muslim Abbasid Caliphate based in Baghdad. The walls were twelve cubits (Note: Cubit: About 18 inches (460 mm). At twelve cubits, the walls would have been about 18 feet (5.5 m) wide.) wide, made of burned brick jointed with lime mortar. The space between the walls and the interior buildings was equal to the width of a highway.

The city included a congregational mosque. The caliph's palace was near the center of the city, which contained other palaces used for ceremonial, diplomatic and administrative purposes. The main palace was called Sabra ("fortitude"). The palace grounds covered an area of 44 hectares (110 acres). The historian Ibn Hammad described the palace buildings as high and splendid structures surrounded by gardens and waters. They demonstrated the wealth and power of the caliph. The names give some hint of the nature of the palaces: the Camphor Audience Hall, the Chamber of the Diadem, the Fragrant Audience Hall and the Silver Chamber.

El-Mansuriya was completed under al-Muizz li-Din Allah, who ensured the water supply with the construction of an aqueduct. This aqueduct, 36 kilometres (22 mi) in length, was based on a similar structure built by the Aghlabids. El-Muizz built a new canal on the aqueduct and added a 9 kilometres (5.6 mi) extension to carry water to el-Mansuriya. El-Muizz also had a great hall built. Its massive columns, more than 1 metre (3 ft 3 in) in diameter, were brought from Sousse, a day's march away. Construction of the city was not completed until 972, the year before el-Muizz moved to Egypt.

== Occupation ==
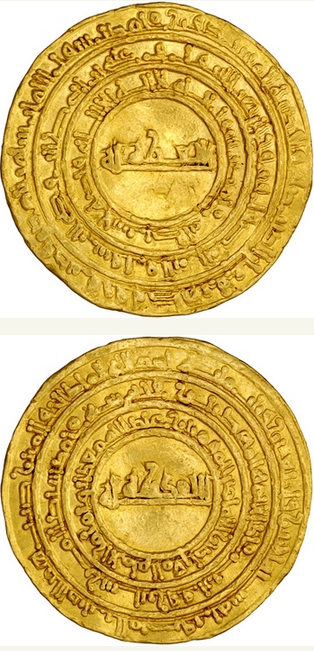
Dinar minted in el-Mansuriya in 953-954

The city was primarily a royal residence. It contained palaces, gardens, a menagerie with lions, barracks and the royal stables. El-Mansur moved 14,000 Kutama families to the city and set up a souq, or marketplace. However, according to Ibn Muhadhdhab, "el-Muizz commanded the merchants of Kairouan to come to their shops and workshops in el-Mansuriya in the mornings, and to return home to their families in the evenings." Tolls amounting to 26,000 silver dirhams were collected daily on goods entering the city through the four gates.

In its heyday, el-Mansuriya was the capital of a state that encompassed most of North Africa from Morocco to Libya, as well as Sicily, although it had to guard against attack from the Byzantine Empire and from King Otto I of Germany, both active in southern Italy. In 957, an embassy from Byzantium brought the tribute from the Emperor for his occupation of Calabria from there, with gifts of gold and silver vessels adorned with jewels, silks, brocades and other valuables. In Italy, El-Muizz planned the invasion of Egypt, whose conquest would make the Fatimids rivals in power to the Abbasids in Baghdad.

The Fatimid general, Jawhar, conquered Egypt in 969. He built a new palace city in Egypt, near Fustat, which he also called el-Mansuriya. When the imam arrived in 973, the name was changed to el-Qahra (Cairo). The new city was rectangular rather than round in plan. Both cities had mosques named el-Azhar after the prophet Muhammad's daughter, Fatima el-Azhar, and both had gates named Bab el-Futuh and Bab Zuwaila. Both cities had two palaces, for the caliph and for his heir, opposite each other.

After the Fatimid caliphs moved to Egypt, el-Mansuriya remained the capital of the Zirids, who became the local rulers, for the next eighty-five years. The Zirid ruler el-Mansur bin Buluggin built a palace for himself at el-Mansuriya. There is a record of the lavish marriage in 1022-23 of his grandson, the young Zirid el-Muizz bin Badis. Pavilions were built outside the city, a large array of textiles and manufactured good was displayed and music was provided by a great number of instruments. El-Muizz bin Badis, who ruled Ifriqiya under the Fatimids from 1015 to 1062, rebuilt the Kairouan city wall and built two walls on either side of the road from Kairouan to el-Mansuriya. He ordered the transfer to el-Mansuriya of the crafts and commerce from Kairouan.

== Destruction ==
The city faced attacks from Arab nomads from the Banu Hilal tribe. In 1057 the Zirids abandoned it for el-Mahdia, and it was never occupied again. Its building materials were later used by the inhabitants of Kairouan. As of 2009 the site of the city was a wasteland, crossed by many ditches, surrounded by the homes of poor people. Anything that could be reused for construction or other purposes has been scavenged during the centuries since it was abandoned. Stones, bricks, glass and metal were all removed. Little survived except fragments of unusable stucco.

== Archaeology ==
Aerial surveys of the site have confirmed that there was a very large artificial enclosure, roughly circular in shape, within which are what is left of several circular and rectangular basins. The basins may be identified with the artificial pools described by the court poet Ali ibn Muhammad el-Iyadi, which surrounded the palace. The foundations have been revealed through archaeological excavations. Traces of the great hall's columns are still visible. Some parts of the canal can still be seen.

A minor excavation was undertaken by Georges Marçais in the 1920s. Slimane Mostafa Zbiss conducted a more thorough excavation in the 1950s of the palace in the southeast quadrant of the city. Further excavations by a Franco-Tunisian team were made around the southeast palace in the late 1970s, ending in 1982. Few results have been published from these earlier excavations, and no records were made of the stratigraphic locations of the stucco fragments that were found.

A more careful project was undertaken between 2003 and 2008, with more effort made to place the stucco fragments. There is evidence of multiple phases of occupation with different styles of decoration, including flower and leaf patterns, geometric patterns, animal and human figures and epigraphy. Some decorations resemble pre-Islamic Tunisian work, while others are common to other Islamic sites. Evidence of cultural exchange with Egypt is less than might be expected, while the remains show a surprising amount of contact with al-Andalus, despite the continuous hostilities between the Fatimids and the Umayyads of the Iberian peninsula.

== Sources ==
- Barrucand, Marianne; Rammah, Mourad (2009). "Sabra el-Mansuriyya and her neighbors during the first half of the eleventh century: Investigations into stucco decoration". Muqarnas. BRILL. ISBN 978-90-04-17589-1.
- Cortese, Delia; Calderini, Simonetta (2006). Women And the Fatimids in the World of Islam. Edinburgh University Press. ISBN 978-0-7486-1733-3.
- Daftary, Farhad (1998). A Short History of the Ismailis: Traditions of a Muslim Community. Edinburgh University Press. ISBN 978-0-7486-0904-8.
- Deza, Michel Marie; Deza, Elena (2012). Encyclopedia of Distances. Springer. ISBN 978-3-6423-0958-8.
- Grabar, Oleg (1 June 1985). Muqarnas, Volume 3: An Annual on Islamic Art and Architecture. BRILL. ISBN 978-90-04-07611-2.
- Halm, Heinz (1996). The Empire of the Mahdi: The Rise of the Fatimids. Handbook of Oriental Studies. Vol. 26. Translated by Michael Bonner. Leiden: BRILL. ISBN 9004100563.
- Jayyusi, Salma Khadra; Holod, Renata; Petruccioli, Attilio; Raymond, André (2008). The City in the Islamic World. BRILL. ISBN 978-90-04-17168-8.
- Kupferschmidt, Uri M. (1987). The Supreme Muslim Council: Islam Under the British Mandate for Palestine. BRILL. ISBN 978-90-04-07929-8.
- Ruggles, D. Fairchild (2011). Islamic Art and Visual Culture: An Anthology of Sources. John Wiley & Sons. ISBN 978-1-4051-5401-7.
- Safran, Janina M. (2000). The Second Umayyad Caliphate: The Articulation of Caliphal Legitimacy in El-Andalus. Harvard CMES. ISBN 978-0-932885-24-1.
- "The Art of the Fatimid Period (909–1171)". Metmuseum.org.
- Tracy, James D. (2000). City Walls: The Urban Enceinte in Global Perspective. Cambridge University Press. ISBN 978-0-521-65221-6.
- Yeomans, Richard (2006). The art and architecture of islamic cairo. Garnet & Ithaca Press. ISBN 978-1-85964-154-5.
