= Abu Yazid =

Kharijite Berber leader (c. 873–947)

Abū Yazīd Makhlad ibn Kaydād (Arabic: أبو يزيد مخلد بن كيداد; c. 873 – 19 August 947), was a member of the Ibadi sect. He opposed the Ismaili Shia rule of the Fatimids in North Africa and sought to restore Ibadi dominance in the region. Known as the Man on the Donkey (Arabic: صاحب الحمار, romanized: Ṣāhib al-Himār) due to his humble means of transport, Abu Yazid led a rebellion against the Fatimid Caliphate in Ifriqiya (modern Tunisia and eastern Algeria) starting in 944, rallying various Berber tribes and disaffected groups against the Fatimids. His forces initially achieved significant victories, even threatening the Fatimid capital of al-Mahdiyya. Abu Yazid conquered Kairouan for a time, but was eventually driven back and defeated by the Fatimid caliph al-Mansur bi-Nasr Allah in 947, Abu Yazid escaped following a siege, but was wounded and captured. He died of his wounds several days later.

== Early life ==
Abu Yazid's father Kaydad was a Zenata Berber from Taqyus or Tozeur in the district of Chott el Djerid, then still known by its ancient name, Qastiliya. Kaydad was a trans-Saharan trader, and during his travels took as concubine a Hawwara or Black African slave, Sabika. Abu Yazid was born c. 874 south of the Sahara, at Tadmakka or Gao. Coupled with his mother's descent, this brought him the sobriquet "the Black Ethiop" (al-Habashi al-Aswad).

Abu Yazid returned with his father to Qitun near Tozeur, where Kaydad died shortly after. The orphaned boy survived through alms, and in his youth became a schoolmaster in the area of Qitun, Tozeur, and Taqyus. Likely raised as a Kharijite from infancy, Abu Yazid went to Tahert to study the Ibadi doctrine (madhhab); at the time, Tahert was still the seat of an Ibadi imam of the Rustamid dynasty, who was widely acknowledged by the North African Kharijites as their spiritual leader. Abu Yazid was an eyewitness to the end of the Ibadi imamate in 909: after the overthrow of the Aghlabid emirate by the Isma'ili preacher Abu Abdallah al-Shi'i and his Kutama followers, the latter marched west to Sijilmasa, to bring his hidden master, Abdallah al-Mahdi Billah, back to Ifriqiya to assume the throne of the Fatimid Caliphate. On the way, the Kutama overthrew and executed the Rustamid imam, and installed a Fatimid governor in his place. Abu Yazid returned to Takyus, and resumed his activity as a schoolmaster.

The Aurès Mountains were the stronghold from which Abu Yazid launched his uprising

In 928, Abu Yazid began his anti-Fatimid agitation. He was arrested in 934 but escaped, and went on the Hajj to Mecca. In 937 he returned to Tozeur clandestinely and resumed his preaching. He was denounced and arrested once again, but sprung out of prison by his former teacher Abu Ammar Abd al-Hamid al-A'ma and forty of his armed followers, along with two of Abu Yazid's sons. Abu Yazid and his family fled to the Aurès Mountains in what is now eastern Algeria, finding refuge with the Hawwara tribe. The area had in the previous decades been converted to the Nukkari branch of Ibadi Islam, and was a major centre of the sect, with Abu Ammar as its local leader. The Nukkaris rejected the hereditary Rustamid imams and insisted upon the election of the community's leader.

== Rebellion ==
Abu Yazid, his wife and four sons, Abu Ammar, and twelve followers settled at the village of al-Nawalat, which became the centre of their movement. Abu Yazid toured the region and called the locals to join him in holy war against the Fatimids. The group soon succeeded in gaining a large following among the Hawwara, and Abu Yazid was elected as their leader (shaykh al-Muslimin, lit. 'patriarch of the Muslims'). Thereupon Abu Ammar relinquished his leadership to him as the more worthy one (afḍal), in accordance with the Nukkari doctrine. Abu Yazid deliberately avoided assuming the title of imam for the moment; an imam would be elected once the Fatimid capital, al-Mahdiya, was taken, but until then, an assembly would govern the movement.

Abu Yazid's movement was the spiritual heir to a number of tendencies endemic in the Maghreb: the Ibadi movement, with its anti-Arab and pro-Berber chauvinism and its insistence that leadership belonged to the "best Muslim", in marked contrast to the Fatimids' claims to a hereditary imamate; the anti-imperial traditions of the great Berber Revolt against the Umayyad Caliphate in 740; and the strong messianic traditions of the Maghreb, which had welcomed and sheltered the Alids persecuted by the Abbasid Caliphate, and which would recur throughout history, culminating in the messianic empire of the Almohads in the 12th–13th centuries.

Abu Yazid himself cut a messianic figure: his appearance fitted the signs of a prophet in Islamic messianic tradition, such as a mole on his shoulder; of advanced age, dressed in rags and lame, he rode a donkey, which gave him the nickname "Man on the Donkey" or "Lord of the Donkey" (Sahib al-Himar). The "awaited prophet who would come riding on an ass" was a figure with a long tradition in Judaic, and later Islamic, eschatology, was associated with Jesus and Muhammad, and was emulated by several would-be prophets during the early Islamic centuries. Even his pejorative sobriquet al-Habashi was often held to have messianic connotations. On the other hand, Abu Yazid's Fatimid enemies cast him as the "False Messiah" (al-Masih al-Dajjal).

=== Invasion of Ifriqiya and the fall of Kairouan, February–October 944 ===
In February 944, Abu Yazid's followers descended from the mountains to overthrow the Fatimids, attacking the forts in the environs of Baghaya. The uprising appears to have caught the Fatimids by surprise. The local governor tried to put pressure on the tribal chieftains to deliver Abu Yazid to him, but in vain. Caliph al-Qa'im mobilized his loyal Kutama tribes, but the small and highly mobile bands of Abu Yazid eluded them, and were always able to escape back to the safety of the Aurès.

The first major settlement to capitulate was Tébessa, followed by Marmajanna, where he was given his famous donkey to ride. After the surrender of Sbiba, the rebels destroyed a Kutama army near Dougga and captured the city. On 7 August 944, al-Aribus (ancient Laribus), the gate to the core of Fatimid Ifriqiya, surrendered in exchange for a letter of safety (aman) for its inhabitants; Fatimid officials and all adherents of Isma'ilism were explicitly excluded from it. Al-Qa'im mobilized four armies in response: one to defend the old Aghlabid palace city of Raqqada, one under Khalil ibn Ishaq al-Tamimi to secure the former capital and major city of Ifriqiya, Kairouan, one under the eunuch Bushra to the area of Béja, and the main army under Maysur al-Fata, which was to encamp midway between al-Mahdiya and Kairouan, ready to assist either.

These dispositions left the initiative to the rebels, who attacked Bushra. In the subsequent battle, the Fatimids initially prevailed, until Abu Yazid, unarmed and in his usual ascetic habit, rallied his men and led them to victory. Béja was sacked for three days, while Bushra and his men withdrew, first to Tunis, and then, as its inhabitants wanted to surrender, over sea to Sousse. On 13 October, Abu Yazid's forces appeared before Raqqada, which they plundered. Ensconced in Kairouan, Khalil al-Tamimi resisted his officers' calls to march out and confront the rebel army, awaiting the arrival of the main Fatimid army under Maysur al-Fata, but the latter also hesitated to move decisively against the rebels.

As a result, the disgruntled and unpaid soldiers of the local militia began deserting to the rebels, until Khalil was left with only 400 men. Unable to man the city walls with this small a force, he withdrew to the governor's palace next to the Great Mosque of Kairouan. As Abu Yazid's troops entered Kairouan on 14 October, Khalil began to negotiate an aman with the rebels. Most of his men used a rope to escape from the back of the palace, but Khalil, the city's chief qadi, the army treasurer and thirty others were taken prisoner and led to Abu Yazid in Raqqada. The rebel leader initially intended to spare Khalil's life, but Abu Ammar pointed out that dangerous foes should be killed. As a result, Abu Yazid had Khalil and the chief qadi executed. Abu Yazid completed his triumph by destroying Maysur's army in a surprise night attack on 29/30 October: Maysur was killed, and his army disintegrated. Shortly after, Sousse was sacked as well.

The mostly Maliki Sunni inhabitants of Kairouan, who greatly resented Fatimid rule, were initially supportive of Abu Yazid's takeover, but the unruly behaviour of his Berber followers and their rapacious behaviour quickly alienated them. Abu Yazid himself was not immune to the accusations: after the conquest of Kairouan he began to abandon his Spartan habits for silk clothes, and his characteristic donkey for thoroughbred horses, which estranged his more austere followers. He even took two sisters as concubines, disregarding Sunni law, arguing that, as non-Kharijites, they were slaves and he could do as he pleased.

=== Failure at al-Mahdiya, January–September 945 ===
Leaving Abu Ammar and his own son Fadl to govern Kairouan in his name, Abu Yazid moved to capture the final Fatimid stronghold, the palace city of al-Mahdiya. Abu Yazid arrived before the Fatimid capital on 9 January 945. The first attack on the city, on 20 January 945, reached the wall of the palace city, but was eventually pushed back. The city was placed under blockade, which lasted until 16 September 945.

The Fatimid position was difficult, as the ships bringing in grain supplies ran aground and were captured by the rebels, but Abu Yazid also faced problems. Most of his men were untrained peasants, who now returned to their fields, or out for plunder; the Kharijite leader could count firmly only on the Hawwara. As a result, the siege was not very effective, and Fatimid sallies sometimes found the enemy camp empty. In the meantime, Abu Yazid himself had to face a revolt by a man who pretended to be an Abbasid prince and the mahdi, the Islamic messiah; Abu Yazid's son Ayyub, governor of Béja, arrested and executed the man after an interrogation proved he was an impostor.

The siege of al-Mahdiya was broken as a result of the defection of the Arab troops from al-Aribus on 16 September: at the crucial point of a battle against a Fatimid sortie, the Arabs turned on their erstwhile allies. The rebel army suffered heavy losses, and Abu Yazid was forced to retreat to Kairouan.

=== Pro-Fatimid plots and uprisings, September–November 945 ===
Admonished by Abu Ammar, he abandoned the luxuries he had adopted and returned to his previous austere life, leading to a resurgence in Berber support for his cause. However, the inhabitants of Kairouan had by now turned against him. Some contacted the Fatimids, offering to hand him over; an assassination plot was discovered and averted; and riots erupted over the issue of the abduction of the locals' daughters and concubines by the Kharijite soldiery. Abu Yazid was forced to promise to stop the practice, and departed Kairouan; thereupon the locals forcibly released many women who had been abducted.

Discontent with Abu Yazid's rule spread across other parts of Ifriqiya: Sousse rose in revolt and, assisted by a Fatimid fleet, overthrew Kharijite rule. Tunis, Béja and al-Aribus followed suit. During the following months, heavy fighting between Abu Yazid's and the Fatimid forces occurred at Tunis, which was captured and recaptured by both sides, and left almost completely destroyed. A similar fate befell Béja and al-Aribus.

Abu Yazid's son Ayyub defeated a Fatimid army from Msila. Its commander, the veteran Fatimid partisan Ali ibn Hamdun al-Andalusi, was mortally wounded and died shortly after. In November, Ayyub was defeated by Fatimid troops under al-Hasan ibn Ali al-Kalbi, before in turn defeating the latter. Al-Hasan ibn Ali withdrew to the territories of the Kutama Berbers in Lesser Kabylia, who were the mainstay of the Fatimid regime; from there he took over the fortresses of Tijis and Baghaya, threatening Abu Yazid's rear.

Seeking allies against the Fatimids, Abu Yazid sent some Kairouan notables as envoys to the Spanish Umayyads. After this first embassy was well received, Abu Yazid sent Ayyub to pledge allegiance to the Umayyad caliph Abd al-Rahman III, who in turn promised to send support. As the year was late and the sailing season over, however, the Umayyad fleet was set to sail in the next year.

=== Siege of Sousse and death of al-Qa'im, January–May 946 ===
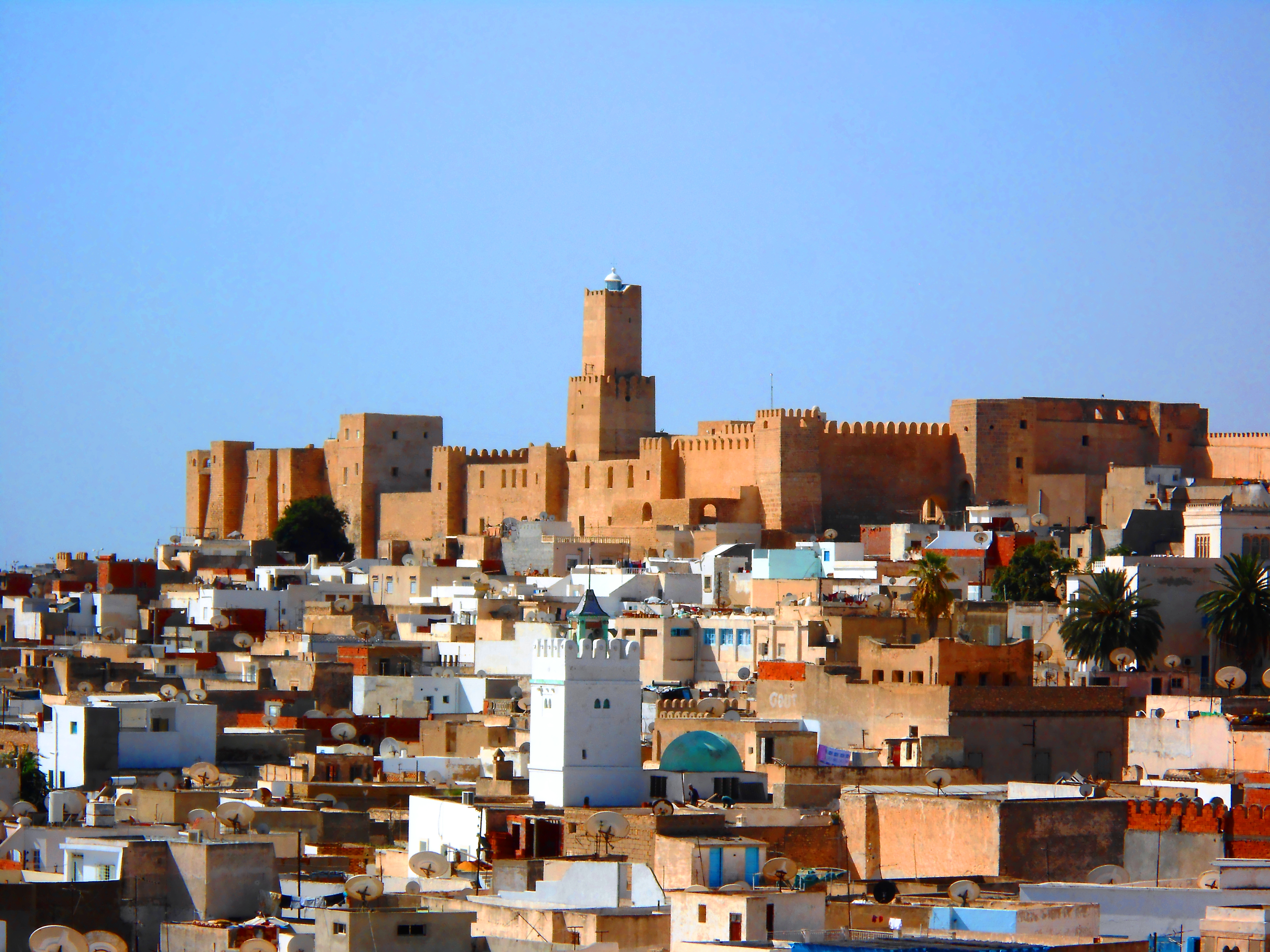
The citadel (Kasbah) of Sousse today

By the end of 945, the war hung in a precarious balance. The revolt still controlled the core regions of Ifriqiya, but with the aid of their fleet the Fatimids held on to al-Mahdiya, Sousse, Tripolitania, and Sicily, as well as parts of western Ifriqiya: the Zab region and Lesser Kabylia. Abu Yazid thus marched to recover control of Sousse, beginning a siege of the city on 13 January 946. This was the first regular siege of the conflict, with the rebels constructing and using siege engines.

On 17 May 946, Caliph al-Qa'im died and was succeeded by his son Isma'il al-Mansur Billah. To avoid giving the rebels any advantage, al-Mansur and his government hid the death of his father, a task made easier by the reclusive life al-Qa'im had led, rarely venturing out of his palace during his reign. All public business and ceremonies were still conducted in al-Qa'im's name, and al-Mansur acted ostensibly only as his heir-designate. Even the regnal name of al-Mansur ("the Victorious") was only publicly assumed after the final suppression of the uprising.

The new ruler quickly gave proof of his ability. Already before his father's death, on 16 May, al-Mansur sent by sea weapons and supplies to Sousse, and within days launched a coordinated attack to relieve the city: on 26 May, the garrison of Sousse, assisted by Kutama Berber cavalry from the south and troops landed by sea from the north, broke the siege of the city and forced Abu Yazid to withdraw his forces inland towards Kairouan.

=== Battle for Kairouan, May–August 946 ===
Abu Yazid retreated towards Kairouan, only to find that the populace, exasperated by the exactions of his Berber supporters, had risen in revolt and shut the gates against him. After ransoming Abu Ammar from captivity, he established a camp two days' march from the city. In the meantime, al-Mansur issued a full amnesty to the notables of Kairouan in return for their renewed loyalty, and on 28 May, the caliph entered the city with his troops, and set up a fortified camp south of it. Abu Yazid attacked the camp on the morning of 5 June, and was only thrown back with great difficulty, after al-Mansur himself reportedly rallied the defenders.

The two armies remained entrenched around Kairouan for the next two months, engaging in frequent clashes. Abu Yazid tried several times to take the city gates by assault, but al-Mansur had established smaller fortified camps to protect them. Abu Yazid attempted to force the Fatimids to withdraw by sending his son Fadl to raid the environs of al-Mahdiya, where many of the Kutama had settled their families; but although al-Mansur sent some troops to shield them, he refused to move his main army. While al-Mansur was slowly building up his numerically inferior forces with contingents from the more remote provinces of the Fatimid empire, Abu Yazid's support began to dwindle. More and more followers abandoned his camp, and only the Hawwara and Banu Kamlan Berbers remained steadfastly loyal to him. With increasing confidence, al-Mansur marched his army out to provoke a pitched battle, but Abu Yazid refused. Finally, on 13 August the Fatimids stormed the rebel camp, and Abu Yazid's troops broke and fled.

The victory proved doubly fortuitous for al-Mansur, as an Umayyad fleet, dispatched to assist Abu Yazid, turned back after reaching Ténès, when its commander heard news of the Fatimid victory at Kairouan. In the meantime, al-Hasan al-Kalbi gathered the Kutama levies at Constantine, and recaptured Béja and Tunis. With Abu Yazid in retreat, he now joined his forces with al-Mansur's army.

=== Pursuit by al-Mansur, October 946 – March 947 ===
On 24 October 946, al-Mansur left Kairouan in pursuit of the retreating Abu Yazid. By early December, the Fatimid caliph recovered Marmajanna, Béja, Billizma, Tubna (ancient Tubunae), and Biskra. The Fatimids were greeted as liberators by the locals, and received the submission of Muhammad ibn Khazar, the leader of the Zenata Berbers, and the governor of Msila and the Zab region, Ja'far ibn Ali ibn Hamdun al-Andalusi (whose father had died after a battle with Ayyub in 945) . With the lands of the Zenata now barred to him, Abu Yazid turned south to bypass them through the desert. Al-Mansur tried to follow him, but at Biskra he was forced to stop, as the local guides warned him that the route followed by the Kharijite leader and his followers was extremely dangerous.

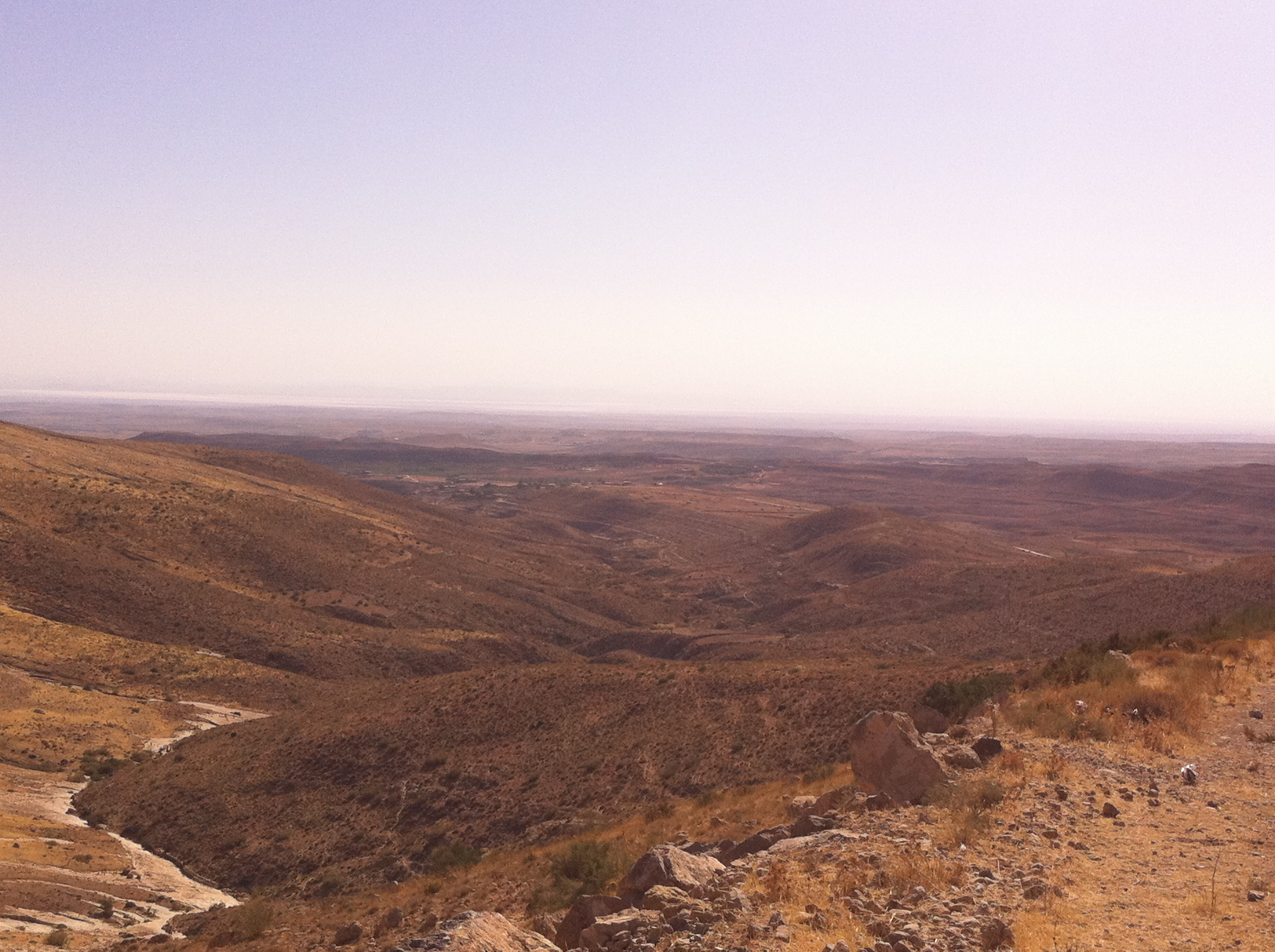
View of the Hodna Mountains

After crossing the desert, Abu Yazid established himself in the Jabal Salat mountains, west of the Chott el Hodna lake. As a result, the Fatimid army turned back from Biskra to Tubna, and thence marched west, along the northern shore of Chott el Hodna. Abu Yazid confronted them at Maqqara, but was defeated in battle on 9 December 946, after which he fled to the mountains of Jabal Salat. The victory allowed al-Mansur to secure his control over Msila, and brought the submission of the local tribes and towns.

Shortly after, Abu Yazid launched an attack on al-Mansur's army camp near Msila, but was again beaten back. Al-Mansur sent his troops into the Hodna Mountains to pursue the rebel, but Abu Yazid again fled to the Jabal Salat. When the Fatimid troops pursued him there in late December, he again fled to the desert, and this time al-Mansur was determined to follow him. After a grueling eleven-day march in the desert he was forced to turn back, only for the heavy winter to take further toll on his army; the Fatimid caliph himself fell heavily ill due to the rigours of the campaign and was bedridden for two weeks. On 30 January 947, the Fatimid army returned to Msila to rest and await spring. At this point, Abu Yazid was near despair, and contemplated abandoning the fight and returning to his homeland south of the Sahara. It was only the protestations of his followers from the Hawwara and Banu Kamlan tribes that convinced him to persist.

Abu Yazid now settled in the ruined fortress of Azbih (the Byzantine-era Zabi Iustiniana) near Msila. In the meantime, the Zenata Berbers also submitted to Fatimid authority, thus cutting off Abu Yazid's supply routes. On 6 March, al-Mansur, accompanied by 4,000 of his own cavalry and 500 Sanhaja, set out for Azbih. They found the fortress deserted, but as they turned back, the rear guard was suddenly attacked by Abu Yazid and his men. In the ensuing battle, the Fatimid ruler again prevailed, and Abu Yazid, wounded, barely managed to escape. His son Yunus was killed, and 1070 severed heads of his followers were sent as token of victory to Kairouan by al-Mansur.

=== Siege of Kiyana and death, March–August 947 ===
Abu Yazid fled once more to the Hodna Mountains. The Fatimid troops pursued the rebel leader relentlessly, over narrow mountain paths. Abu Yazid's camp was captured and torched, but he managed to find refuge in the fortress of Kiyana (close to the later Beni Hammad Fort). Al-Mansur did not immediately attack him there, but instead methodically subdued the surrounding mountains to deprive him of any support. The Fatimid ruler demonstratively ordered the construction of a wooden cage for Abu Yazid.

On 26 April, al-Mansur began his siege of the fortress, with siege engines shipped from Ifriqiya over sea and carried over the mountains. The besieged tried repeatedly to break the siege with sallies, but were pushed back. In early June, the neighbouring fortresses of Shakir and Aqqar, also held by rebels, surrendered, and on 14 August 947, the final attack on Kiyana was launched. After bitter fighting, around noon the defence was broken, and the besieged withdrew to a keep. Al-Mansur offered a pardon if they would hand over Abu Yazid, but they refused. At dawn on the next day, the besieged tried to break through to safety, but were defeated. Abu Ammar was killed, but Abu Yazid managed to escape, only to fall in a ravine and be captured. Heavily wounded, he was interrogated by the caliph, before dying of his injuries after four days, on 19 August.

Abu Yazid's skin was salted and stuffed, to be paraded in public in every town the victorious caliph passed on his way back, sat on a camel and dressed in a tall heretic's cap, with specially trained monkeys pulling at his beard and giving blows to his head. Abu Yazid's son Fadl resisted for a while in the Aurès and the area of Qafsa, but he was killed in battle in May/June 948. His severed head was dispatched to the caliph, who sent it together with the stuffed skin of his father to Sicily as a warning. The ship sank, but Abu Yazid's corpse was washed ashore at al-Mahdiya, where it was crucified and publicly displayed. Two of Abu Yazid's sons, Yazid and Ayyub, tried to continue the resistance in the Aurès, but they too were soon after defeated and killed.

== Legacy ==
Abu Yazid's defeat was a watershed moment for the Fatimid dynasty. As the historian Michael Brett comments, "in life, Abu Yazid had brought the [Fatimid] dynasty to the brink of destruction; in death he was a godsend", as it allowed the dynasty to relaunch itself following the failures of al-Qa'im's reign. Immortalized in Fatimid historiography as the Dajjāl, the rebellion was conceived as an apocalyptic event foreseen by al-Mahdi, for which purpose he had constructed al-Mahdiyya, "as a refuge for the dynasty from the great enemy, and a citadel from which the whole world would then be conquered", and the victory over it as a resurrection of the dynasty. On the very day of Abu Yazid's death, al-Mansur declared himself as the imam and caliph, and publicly assumed his regnal title of al-Manṣūr bi-Naṣr Allāh, "The Conqueror with the Help of God". At the same time, Abu Yazid's rebellion marks the swansong of militant Kharijism in the Maghreb. Following his defeat, Kharijism was confined to marginalized groups in the fringes of the settled areas—the oases of Ghardaya and Wargla, Djerba Island, and the Nafusa Mountains—mostly engaging in theological activity.

One scholar argues that the Hausa culture hero Bayajidda represents a folk personification of the supporters of Abu Yazid who fled North Africa after his defeat.

The various Bayajida legends in Hausa folklore describe how Bayajida, son of the king of Baghdad, came to Bornu and married the ruler's daughter. He later fled and came to Daura, fathering the founders of the seven Hausa states. The legends seem to be describing events which happened during the tenth century A.D. and Bayajida may be identical with the Ibāḍite sectary Abū Yazīd who resisted the Fāṭimids of Tunisia until he was killed by them in 947. The debris of his army may have fled across the Sahara and arrived in Bornu, then north of Lake Chad. After some time a part of this rabble which had remained unassimilated moved south-west and interbred with the indigenous inhabitants round Daura, forming the Hausa aristocracies. Different ingredients of the legends may be folk memories of events near Mecca, Berber myths of origin and perhaps Greek mythology, as well as accounting for the introduction of horses and the sinking of wells in rock by the incoming Berbers.
