= Fatimid conquest of Cyrenaica =

- Part of the Fatimid Caliphate's expansion
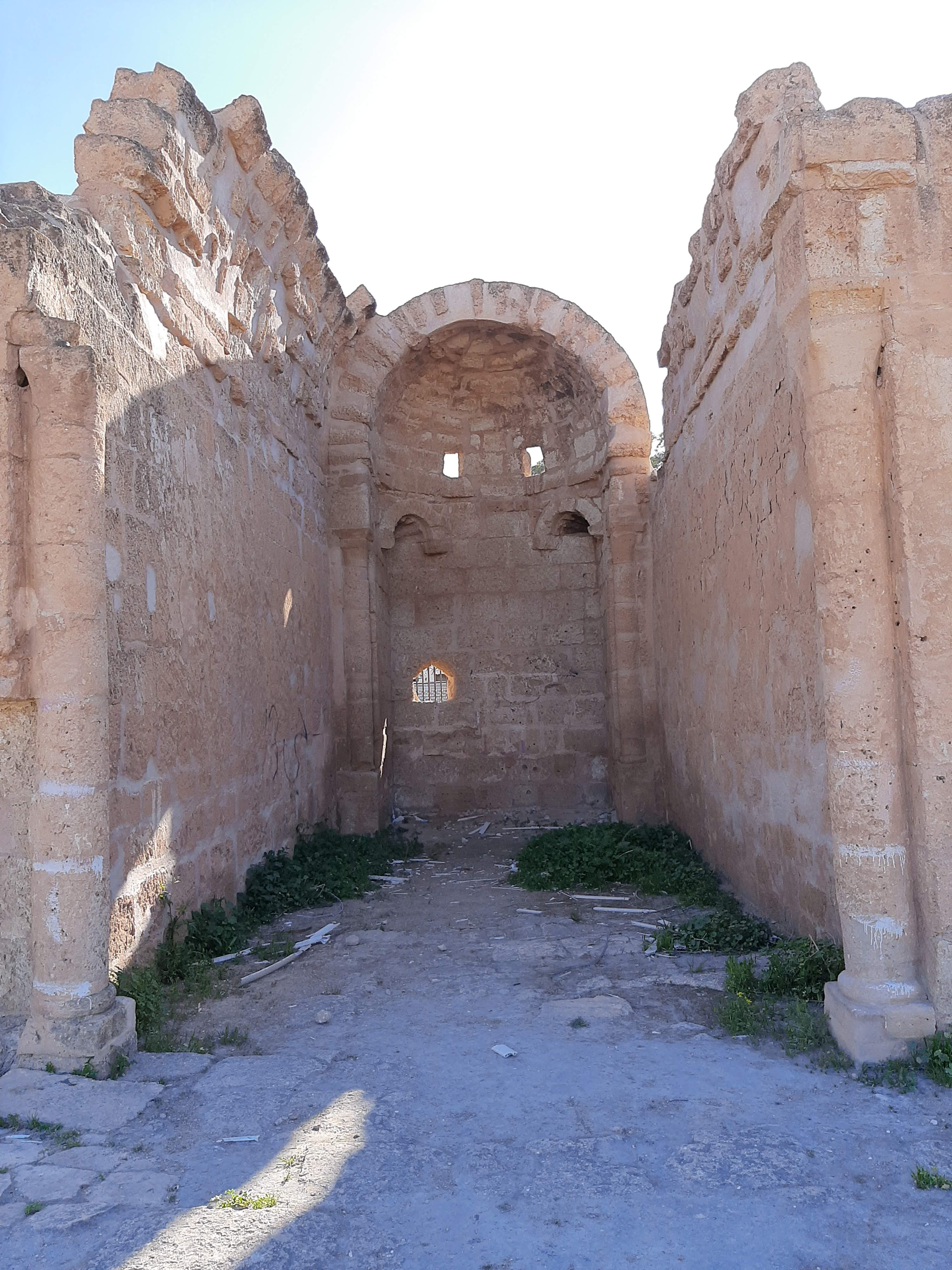
- Ruins of the Fatimid Castle of Ajdabiya.
Date	914
Location	Cyrenaica, Libya 32.498333°N 20.892778°E
Result	Fatimid victory: Beginning of the Fatimid invasion of Egypt
Territorial changes	Cyrenaica conquered by the Fatimids

Belligerents
Fatimid Caliphate	Abbasid Caliphate

Commanders and leaders
Hubasa ibn Yusuf	Governor Takin al-Khazari; Khayr al-Mansuri; Abd al-Aziz ibn Kulayb al-Jarashi; Abi al-Nimr Ahmad ibn Salih
- Location of Barqa the capital of Cyrenaica

The Fatimid conquest of Cyrenaica was a military campaign led by the Fatimid general Hubasa ibn Yusuf al-Kutami. During this campaign, he confronted three Abbasid commanders dispatched by Takin al-Khazari, the governor of Egypt. Hubasa succeeded in seizing Sirte and Ajdabiya, defeated the Abbasid army in Barqa, and forced them to retreat to Fustat. Following these victories, Cyrenaica came under Fatimid control, paving the way for the invasion of Egypt.

== Background ==
After overcoming internal difficulties and restoring security in the regions of Tahert and the Lesser Kabylia, the Fatimid forces did not resume their westward march; instead, they headed east targeting Egypt. It is noteworthy that this movement occurred shortly after the Caliph's inauguration, indicating that eastward expansion was an early strategic choice. An examination of the sources both Sunni and Ismaili, alongside an analysis of their policies in light of their data, reveals that since the inception of their caliphate, they sought to consolidate its foundations and expand their influence according to an integrated political and religious vision. Their focus on the eastern conquests was a cornerstone of their empire.

== Capture of Cyrenaica and Sirte ==
Al-Kindi, a contemporary witness of the event, recounts this within the context of the year 300 AH (912–913 CE). He notes that the campaign began long before 301 AH (914 CE), specifically around 297 AH (910 CE), shortly after Takin al-Khazari was appointed Governor of Fustat by the Abbasid Caliph Al-Muqtadir Billah. Takin promptly dispatched substantial military forces led by his deputy, Abu al-Namir Ahmad ibn Salih, to the region of Barqa to secure control over it. This commander reinforced his positions in Sirte in preparation for an encounter with the Fatimid commander Hubasa ibn Yusuf, who had set out from his base in Tozeur to march on Barqa but was forced to advance toward Sirte.

Da'i Idris and Ibn 'Idhari mention that Hubasa ibn Yusuf captured Sirte without a fight after the Abbasid troops fled, subsequently, he also took control of Ajdabiya without engagement, where a letter announcing this was read in the congregational mosques across Ifriqiya. Takin made an unfortunate decision to dismiss Abu al-Namir, who subsequently retreated from Cyrenaica toward Fustat. Upon learning of this, Hubasa sent word to the departing Abu al-Namir, asking: "What compels you to fight us when you have been dismissed?" Abu al-Namir sent him the official letter he had received from Egypt confirming his removal. Consequently, Hubasa pursued his trail until he entered Barqa, the capital of Cyrenaica without resistance on the 8th of Rajab (February 6, 914 CE), while al-Mahdi dispatched another army to reinforce him.

Farhat Dachraoui observes that despite their imprecise dating, the events narrated by al-Kindi appear closer to reality. It is highly probable that Hubasa, upon assuming command of the army in the eastern theater of war since 910, directed his soldiers toward Egypt and launched the battle against enemy forces stationed in Sirte. By reconciling the data in al-Kindi’s account with the clarifications provided by Da'i Idris, it is possible to conclude that the protracted and inconclusive military operations between the two sides reached their climax when Hubasa received the necessary reinforcements to conquer Barqa In the middle of the year 301 AH / 914 CE.

== Decisive encounter ==
The Fatimid control over Barqa incited the wrath of the Abbasids in Egypt. Consequently, the governor Takin mobilized a formidable army, appointing Khayr al-Mansuri as its commander and Abd al-Aziz ibn Kulayb al-Jarashi as his deputy. The objective was to displace Hubasa ibn Yusuf. According to Ibn 'Idhari, these were massive forces dispatched from Egypt to confront Hubasa and reclaim the city. A fierce battle ensued on 14 March, during which Hubasa initially faced several clashes. Ultimately, however, he routed the Abbasid forces, pursuing them to the Egyptian borders and inflicting heavy casualties.

During these events, Hubasa ibn Yusuf killed Harith and Nizar, the sons of Hammal Al-Mazatani along with a group of their sons and cousins in the city of Barqa. He sold their women and seized all their wealth. This occurred because al-Mahdi had encountered them upon his arrival from Egypt, claiming they had stolen a load of money and goods from him. When Hubasa demanded the return of these items, one of the men insulted and slapped him. This affront was the pretext for Hubasa to execute them.

== Hubasa ibn Yusuf's policy in Barqa ==
Upon entering and seizing control of the city of Barqa, Hubasa encountered a group utilizing carrier pigeons, He immediately ordered their execution, declaring: "These pigeons bring them intelligence from the Abbasids." From an organizational standpoint, he deployed "urafa" (Corporals) from the Kutama tribe to conduct rigorous surveillance and identity verification of those registered, The objective was a qualitative purge of any individuals suspected of harboring Abbasid loyalties.

Sunni chroniclers like Ibn 'Idhari records that This operations culminated in a mass slaughter of approximately 1,000 men, Upon being confronted with the magnitude of the slaughter, the city’s elders were so overwhelmed by the traumatic sight that three individuals perished from terror, a calculated move designed to dismantle internal Abbasid resistance and ensure absolute subjugation. This dominance was further cemented through the imposition of exorbitant financial tributes; when Habasa demanded the delivery of 100,000 mithqals by the following morning, The residents complied and promptly delivered the amount.

Securing Cyrenaica offered a significant financial boost to the Fatimid caliphate. Historically, the region had generated substantial revenue for the Abbasids, including an annual land tax of 24,000 gold dinars. This was further supplemented by 15,000 dinars from the jizya collected from Christian subjects, alongside additional yields from zakat and ushr taxes.

== Prelude to the invasion of Egypt ==
After securing this route, the conditions became favorable to commence the conquest of Egypt. The Fatimid Caliph Ubayd Allah al-Mahdi assembled a large army and entrusted its command to his son and heir, al-Qasim, the future al-Qa'im bi-Amr Allah, who departed from Raqqada toward Egypt on the 15th of Dhu al-Hijjah, 301 AH (914 CE), marking the beginning of the decisive phase of the Fatimid conquests along the Nile Valley.
