= Hodna Mountains =

Mountains in Algeria

- جبل حضنة / Monts du Hodna
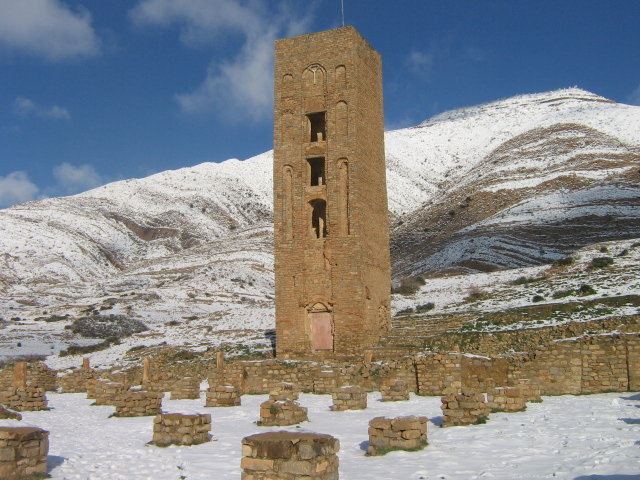
- The southern slope of the Hodna Mountains rising behind the Beni Hammad Fort

Highest point
- Peak: Djebel Tachrirt
- Elevation: 1902
- Coordinates: 35°49′0″N 4°51′0″E

Dimensions
- Length: 90 km (56 mi) ESE/WNW
- Width: 22 km (14 mi) NNE/SSW

Geography
- Location within Algeria
- Country: Algeria
- Provinces: M'Sila, Batna and Sétif
- Parent range: Saharan Atlas

Geology
- Orogeny: Alpine orogeny

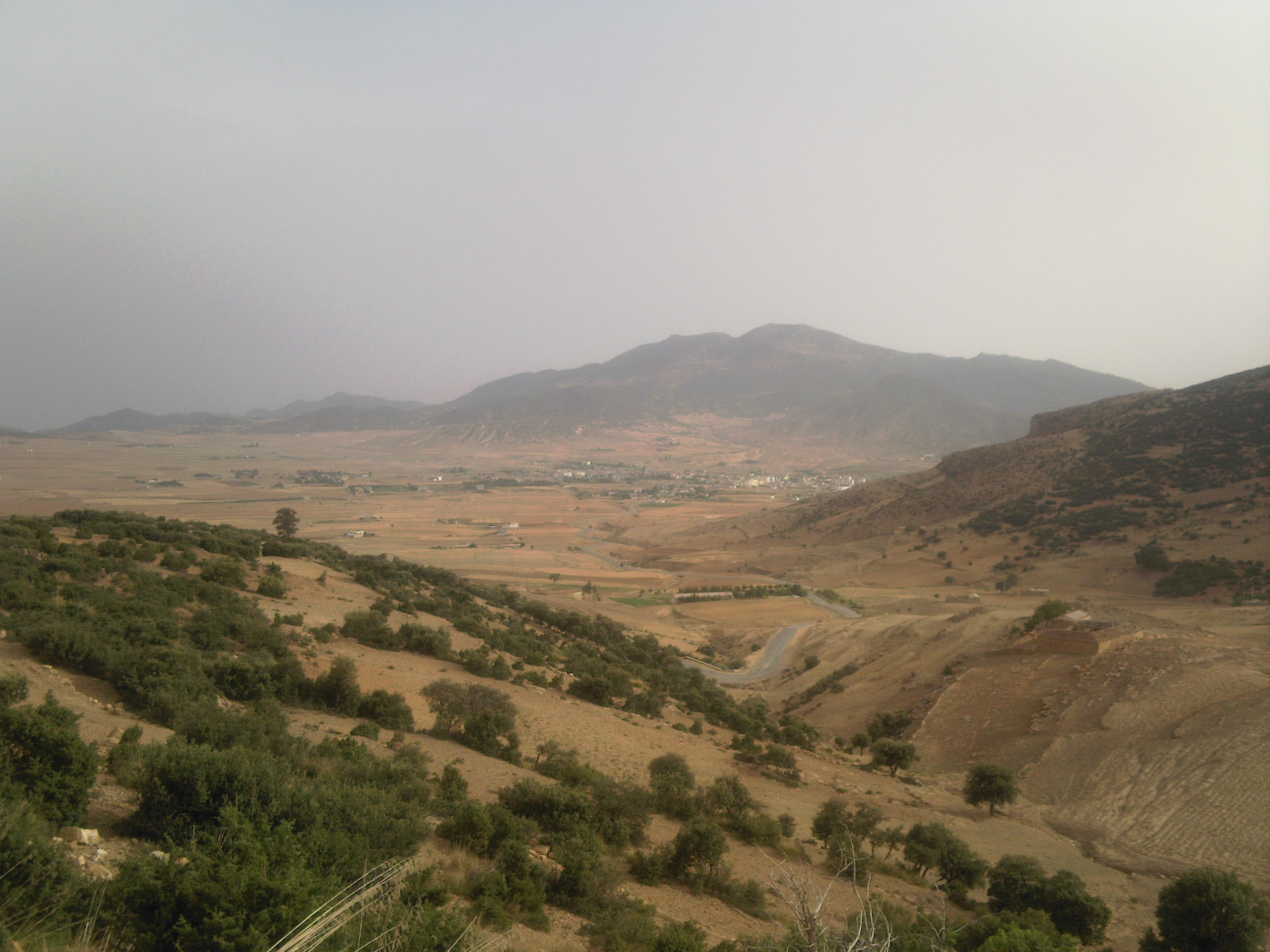
Ouled Tebben

The Hodna Mountains (Arabic: جبال حضنة, French: Monts du Hodna) are a mountain massif in northeastern Algeria. It rises on the northern side of the Hodna natural region in the M'Sila Province, near the town of Maadid around 200 km southeast of Algiers. These mountains are one of the ranges of the Saharan Atlas, part of the Atlas Mountain System.

== Geography and vegetation ==
The Hodna Mountain ridge is located south of Kabylie. It sits at a parallel latitude in a roughly east–west direction between the Bibans in the northwest and the Belezma Range in the east. The highest peak, at 1,902 meters, is the Djebel Tachrirt; another important summit, is 1,659 m high. This mountain is a part of an important religious pilgrimage of some native tribes of Algerians. Djebel Guetiane, both located in the easternmost range of the Hodna chain already in Batna Province, towards the transition zone with the Aurès Mountains. The Maadid Range, the Kiyāna Range and the 'Aqqār Range are other subranges of the Hodna Mountains.

The Hodna Range has a zone of about 8,000 ha of natural cedar forest near Boutaleb growing in relatively xerophile conditions.

=== Water management ===
The former inhabitants of the Hodna Mountains built a complex system of water retention walls named jessour. They were built parallel to the level curves forming steps in the talwegs. On the northern slopes of the Djebel Tachrirt the walls were constructed above the ground level, allowing the snow to accumulate and to melt slowly in order to distribute the available water resulting from the snow melting period. Most of these traditional water management works are now in ruins.

== History ==
The Beni Hammad Fort or Al Qal'a of Beni Hammad (French: Kalâa des Béni Hammad) is the ruin of a fortified Muslim city belonging to the Hammadid dynasty that was built and settled in 1007 and abandoned in 1090. It is located on the southern slopes of the range and includes a 7 km-long line of walls. Inside the walls are four residential complexes, and the largest mosque built in Algeria after that of Mansourah, similar to the Grand Mosque of Kairouan, with a tall minaret (20 m). The remains of the emir's palace, known as Dal al-Bahr, include three separate residences separated by gardens and pavilions. Excavations of the area have brought to light numerous terracotta items, jewels, coins and ceramics, including a number of decorative fountains using the lion as a motif. In 1980 the Beni Hammad Fort was inscribed as a World Heritage Site by UNESCO.

In 945, as Abu Yazid besieged Sousse, Caliph al-Qa'im Bi-Amrillah died and was succeeded by his son al-Mansur. Under al-Mansur's leadership, the Fatimid forces recovered their position, first breaking the siege of Sousse and then driving Abū Yazīd's forces out of Kairouan back into the Aurès Mountains. In 947, the Fatimids finally defeated them in the Kiyana Mountains of this massif near what later became the Beni Hammad Fort.

== Features ==
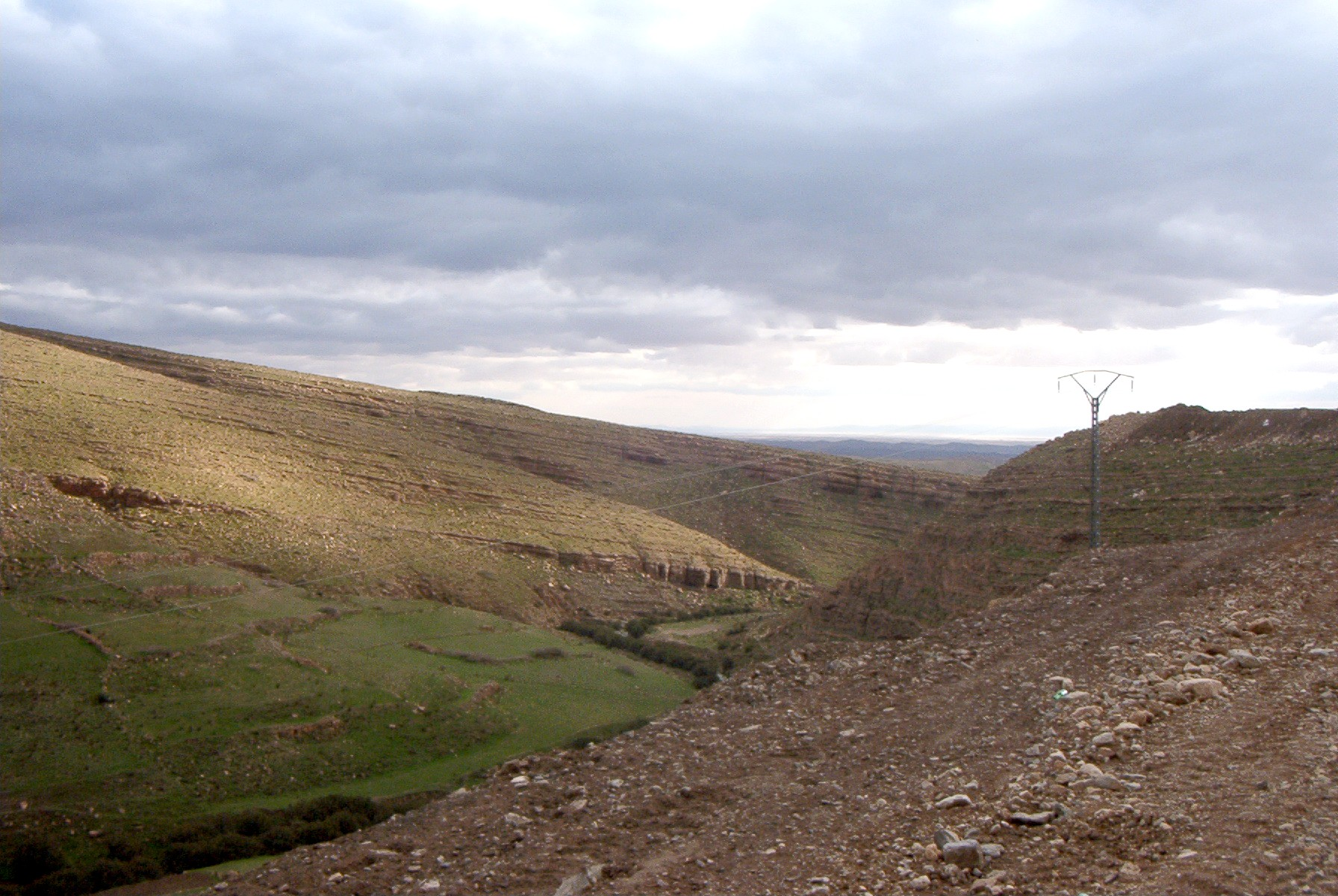
Landscape of the Hodna Range along the Oued Fredj.

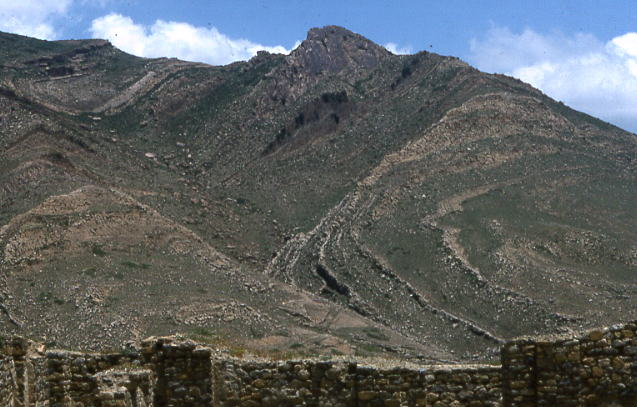
View of one of the mountain slopes of the range.

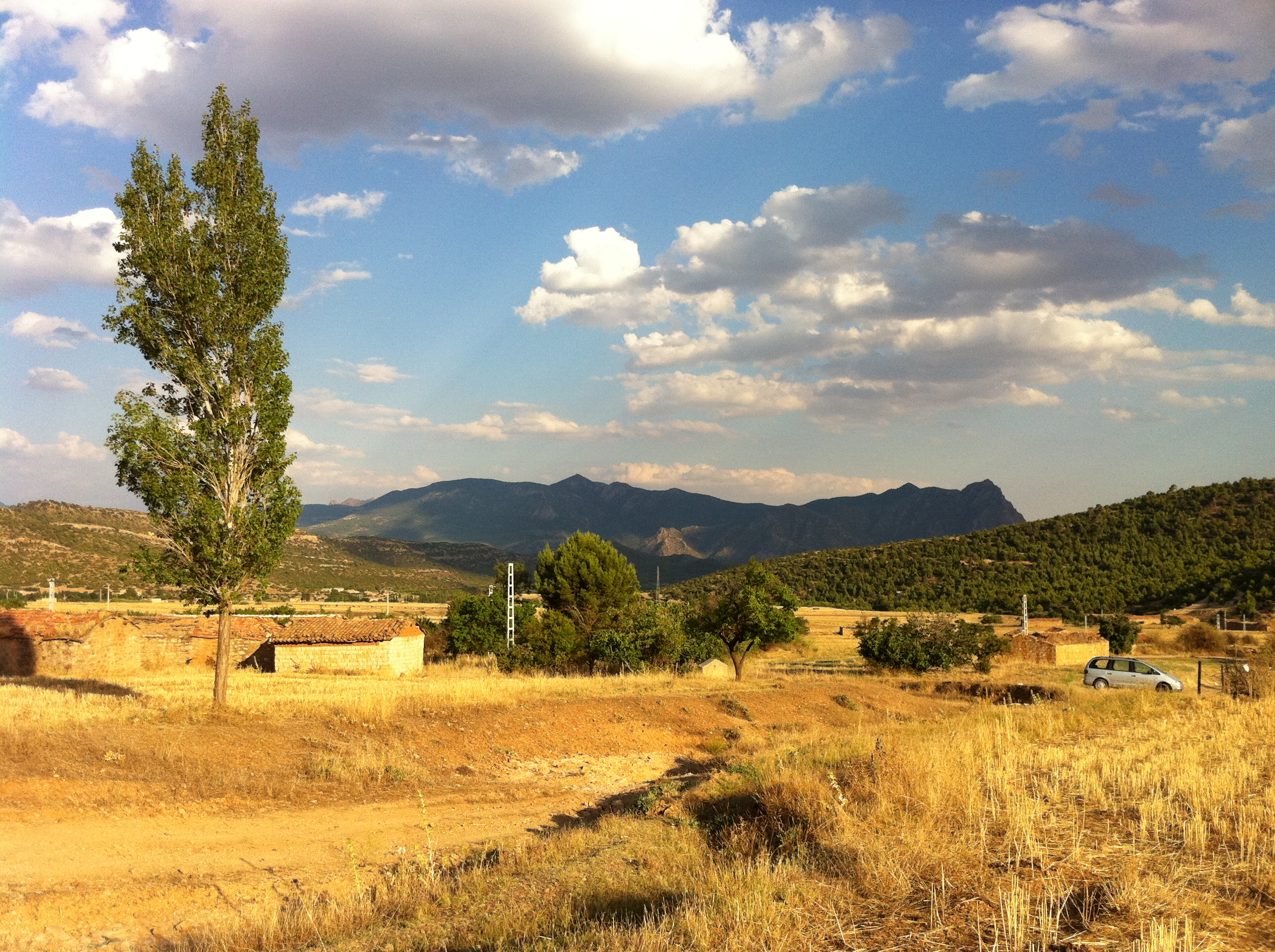
Landscape of the Hodna Mountains at Ouled Tebben, a town located at the heart of the range.

== See also ==
- Geography of Algeria
- Abu Yazid
