= Ja'far ibn Ali ibn Hamdun al-Andalusi =

Fatimid governor of M'Sila (died 982)

Ja'far ibn Ali ibn Hamdun al-Andalusi was an Arab chief and governor of M'Sila for the Fatimid Caliphate, who in 971 defected to the rival Umayyad Caliphate of Córdoba. He was assassinated in 982 by the Umayyad chamberlain, Almanzor. He was the son of Ali ibn Hamdun al-Andalusi.

== Sources ==
- Manzano, Eduardo (2019). La corte del califa: Cuatro años en la Córdoba de los omeyas [The Court of the Caliph: Four Years in Umayyad Córdoba] (in Spanish). Barcelona: Editorial Crítica. ISBN 978-8-49199028-4.
- le Tourneau, R. (1965). "Ḏj̲aʿfar b. ʿAlī b. Ḥamdūn al-Andalusī". In Lewis, B.; Pellat, Ch. & Schacht, J. (eds.). The Encyclopaedia of Islam, Second Edition. Volume II: C–G. Leiden: E. J. Brill. pp. 372–373. doi:10.1163/1573-3912_islam_SIM_191. OCLC 495469475.
