= Abdallah (Ismaili missionary to Gujarat) =

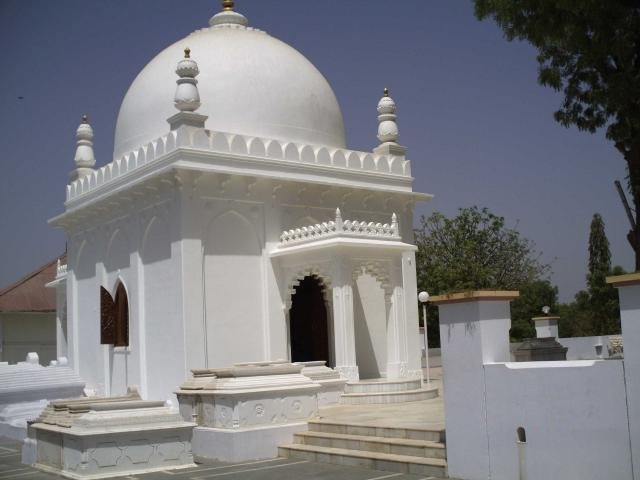
Mausoleum of 1 st Wali–ul–Hind:Moulai Abadullah, Khambat, Gujarat, 11th century

Abdallah (Arabic: عبدالله) was the first Isma'ili missionary (da'i) in Gujarat.

He was sent from Yemen to Cambay (Khambat), Gujarat in India in about 1067 AD (460AH). Syedi Nuruddin was his companion who also visited Imam Al-Mustansir Billah, Egypt. He joined the Ismaili faith under Fatimid Dai Mu'ayyad fi'l-Din al-Shirazi, and came back to Khambat, India to propagate the Taiyabi faith. His earlier name was Balam Nath.

He is said to have stayed some years at Cambay studying the people. He died on August 12, 1141, in Khambhat, Gujarat, India and his mausoleum is located there.

The da'i named Ahmad once took two the Gujarati orphans (Abdallah and Nuruddin) to Cairo, trained them in the Ismaili doctrine, and sent them back to Gujarat as missionaries. Abdallah laid the foundation of the Bohra community. According to the Bohra myths, Jayasimha sent an army to capture Abdallah, but Abdallah converted him to Islam by performing miracles and by exposing the purported miracles of Hindu pandits as fake. There is no evidence that Jayasimha ever gave up Shaivism, but several of the Bohra Walis and Da'i al-Mutlaqs claimed descent from him. These included Syedna Ismail, the 34th Da'i al-Mutlaq.

Two stories are told of his first missionary success. According to one story, Abdallah gained a cultivator's heart by filling his dry well with water. The second states that he travelled to Ahlinvada, Patan. King Sidhraj Jaisingh then sent a force of armed men to fetch him, and surrounded with wall of fire. The King himself went there to meet him. Later on, two of his ministers, Tarmal and Bharmal, became his follower.

Syedi Hasan Feer, 14th century famous saint at Sultan of Patan, was also from the lineage of Maulaya Abdallah.

== Sources ==
- Blank, Jonah (2001). Mullahs on the Mainframe: Islam and Modernity Among the Daudi Bohras. University of Chicago Press. ISBN 978-0-226-05676-0.
- Daftary, Farhad (2007). The Ismāʿı̄lı̄s: Their History and Doctrines (Second ed.). Cambridge: Cambridge University Press. ISBN 978-0-521-61636-2.
