= Syedi Nuruddin =

Syedi Nuruddin, an 11th-century famous saint (death: Jumadi al-Ula 11) and was the Fatimid Ismaili Mustaali Missionary. He was the companion of Maulaya Abdullah (Ismaili Mustaali Missionary) and visited the Imam Al-Mustansir Billah in Cairo, Egypt. He joined the Ismaili Mustaali faith under the Fatimid Da'i Mu'ayyad fi'l-Din al-Shirazi, and came back to Dongaon, Deccan, India to propagate the faith. His earlier name was Roop Nath. His mausoleum is at DonGaon, Maharashtra, India.

A da'i named Ahmad took two the Gujarati orphans (Abdullah and Nuruddin) to Cairo, trained them in the Ismaili doctrine, and sent them back to Gujarat as a missionary.
