= Fatimid Caliphate =

Fourth Islamic caliphate (909–1171)

Fatimid Caliphate الخلافة الفاطمیّة (Arabic) Al-Khilāfa al-Fāṭimiyya
- 909–1171
- The Fatimid Caliphate at its maximum extent
- Capital: Raqqada (909–921); Mahdia (921–948); al-Mansuriya (948–973); Cairo (973–1171)
- Common languages: Arabic; Berber languages; Coptic
- Religion: Ismaili Shia Islam (state); Sunni Islam; Ibadism
- Government: Hereditary monarchy
- Caliph
  - 909–934: Abd Allah al-Mahdi Billah (first)
  - 1160–1171: Al-Adid li-Din Allah (last)
- Vizier
  - 979–983: Ya'qub ibn Killis
  - 1169–1171: Saladin
- History
  - Overthrow of the Aghlabids: 909
  - Fatimid conquest of Egypt and foundation of Cairo: 969
  - Abolished by Saladin: 17 September 1171

Area
  - Total: 4,100,000 km^{2} (1,600,000 sq mi)
- Currency: Fatimid coinage
Preceded by
Abbasid Caliphate
Aghlabid Emirate
Ikhshidid Wilayah
Emirate of Tahert
Succeeded by
Zengids
Ayyubid Sultanate
Crusader States
Emirate of Sicily
Zirid Emirate
Hammadid Emirate
Sulayhids
Sharifate of Mecca

The Fatimid Caliphate (/ˈfætɪmɪd/; Arabic: الخلافة الفاطمیّة, romanised: al-Khilāfa al-Fāṭimiyya), also known as the Fatimid Empire, was a caliphate that existed from the tenth to the twelfth centuries CE under the rule of the Fatimids, an Isma'ili Shi'a dynasty. Spanning a large area of North Africa and West Asia, it extended from the western Mediterranean in the west to the Red Sea in the east. The Fatimids traced their ancestry from the Islamic prophet Muhammad's daughter Fatima and her husband Ali, considered the first Imam of Shi'a Islam. The Fatimids were acknowledged as the rightful imams by different Isma'ili communities as well as by denominations in many other Muslim lands and adjacent regions. Starting in Ifriqiya under the Aghlabids, who were themselves nominally under the Abbasid Caliphate, the Fatimids eventually overthrew both, and extended their rule across the Mediterranean coast, ultimately making Egypt the centre of their caliphate. At its height, the caliphate included—in addition to Egypt—varying areas of the Maghreb, Sicily, the Levant, and the Hejaz.

Between 902 and 909, the foundation of the Fatimid state was realised under the leadership of da'i (missionary) Abu Abdallah, who led Kutama tribal forces in establishing an Isma'ili state and then conquering Aghlabid Ifriqiya, thus paving the way for the establishment of the caliphate. After the conquest, Abdallah al-Mahdi Billah was retrieved from his temporary residence in Sijilmasa, a remote Moroccan city at the edge of the Sahara, and accepted as the Imam of the movement, becoming the first caliph and the founder of the dynasty in 909. In 921, the city of al-Mahdiyya was established on the coast of modern-day Tunisia as the capital. In 948, the capital was shifted their to al-Mansuriyya, near Kairouan, also in modern-day Tunisia. In 969, during the reign of al-Mu'izz, the Fatimids conquered Egypt, and in 973, the center of the caliphate was moved to the newly founded Fatimid capital of Cairo. Egypt became the political, cultural, and religious centre of the empire and it developed a new and "indigenous Arabic culture". After its initial conquests, the caliphate often allowed a degree of religious tolerance towards non-Shi'a sects of Islam, as well as to Jews and Christians. However, its leaders made little headway in persuading the Egyptian population to adopt its religious beliefs.

After the reigns of al-'Aziz and al-Hakim, the long reign of al-Mustansir entrenched a regime in which the caliph remained aloof from state affairs and viziers took on greater importance. Political and ethnic factionalism within the army led to a civil war in the 1060s, which threatened the empire's survival. After a period of revival during the tenure of the vizier Badr al-Jamali, the Fatimid caliphate declined rapidly during the late eleventh and twelfth centuries. In addition to internal difficulties, the caliphate was weakened by the encroachment of the Seljuk Turks into Syria in the 1070s and the arrival of the Crusaders in the Levant in 1097. In 1171, Saladin abolished the dynasty's rule and founded the Ayyubid dynasty, which incorporated the Levant and Egypt back into the nominal sphere of authority of the Abbasid Caliphate.

== Name ==
The Fatimid dynasty claimed descent from Fatimah, the daughter of Muhammad. The dynasty legitimised its claim through descent from Muhammad by way of his daughter and her husband Ali, the first Shi'a imam, hence the dynasty's name, faṭimiyy (Arabic: فَاطِمِيّ), the Arabic relative adjective for Fāṭima.

Emphasising its Alid descent, the dynasty named itself simply the 'Alid dynasty' (al-dawla al-alawiyya), but many hostile Sunni sources only refer to them as the Ubaydids (Banu Ubayd), after the diminutive form Ubayd Allah for the name of the first Fatimid caliph.

== History ==
=== Origins ===
The Fatimid dynasty came to power as the leaders of Isma'ilism, a revolutionary Shi'a movement "which was at the same time political and religious, philosophical and social," and which originally proclaimed nothing less than the arrival of an Islamic messiah. The origins of that movement, and of the dynasty itself, are obscure prior to the late ninth century.

The Fatimid rulers were Arab in origin, starting with its founder, the Isma'ili Shi'a caliph Abdallah al-Mahdi Billah. The caliphate's establishment was accomplished by Kutama Berbers from Little Kabylia, who converted to the Fatimid cause early and made up its original military forces.

==== Early Shi'ism and the roots of Isma'ilism ====
The Shi'a opposed the Umayyad and Abbasid caliphates, whom they considered usurpers. Instead, they believed in the exclusive right of the descendants of Ali through Muhammad's daughter Fatima, to lead the Muslim community. This manifested itself in a line of imams, descendants of Ali via al-Husayn, whom their followers considered as the true representatives of God on earth. At the same time, there was a widespread messianic tradition in Islam concerning the appearance of a mahdi ("the Rightly Guided One") or qa'im ("He Who Arises"), who would restore true Islamic government and justice and usher in the end times. This figure was widely expected – not just among the Shi'a – to be a descendant of Ali. Among Shi'a, however, this belief became a core tenet of their faith, and was applied to several Shi'a leaders who were killed or died; their followers believed that they had gone into "occultation" (ghayba) and would return (or be resurrected) at the appointed time.

These traditions manifested themselves in the succession of the sixth imam, Ja'far al-Sadiq. Al-Sadiq had appointed his son Isma'il ibn Ja'far as his successor, but Isma'il died before his father, and when al-Sadiq himself died in 765, the succession was left open. Most of his followers followed al-Sadiq's son Musa al-Kazim down to a twelfth and final imam who supposedly went into occultation in 874 and would one day return as the mahdī. This branch is hence known as the "Twelvers". Others followed other sons, or even refused to believe that al-Sadiq had died, and expected his return as the mahdī. Another branch believed that al-Sadiq was followed by a seventh imam, who had gone into occultation and would one day return; hence this party is known as the "Seveners". The exact identity of that seventh imam was disputed, but by the late ninth century had commonly been identified with Muhammad, son of Isma'il and grandson of al-Sadiq. From Muhammad's father, Isma'il, the sect, which gave rise to the Fatimids, receives its name of "Isma'ili". Due to the harsh Abbasid persecution of the Alids, the Ismaili Imams went into hiding and neither Isma'il's nor Muhammad's lives are well known, and after Muhammad's death during the reign of Harun al-Rashid (r. 786–809), the history of the early Isma'ili movement becomes obscure.

==== The secret network ====
While the awaited mahdi Muhammad ibn Isma'il remained hidden, however, he would need to be represented by agents, who would gather the faithful, spread the word (da'wa, "invitation, calling"), and prepare his return. The head of this secret network was the living proof of the imam's existence, or "seal" (hujja). It is in this role that the ancestors of the Fatimids are first documented. The first known hujja was a certain Abdallah al-Akbar ("Abdallah the Elder"), a wealthy merchant from Khuzestan, who established himself at the small town of Salamiya on the western edge of the Syrian Desert. Salamiya became the centre of the Isma'ili da'wa, with Abdallah al-Akbar being succeeded by his son and grandson as the secret "grand masters" of the movement.

In the last third of the ninth century, the Isma'ili da'wa spread widely, profiting from the collapse of Abbasid power in the Anarchy at Samarra and the subsequent Zanj Revolt, as well as from dissatisfaction among Twelver adherents with the political quietism of their leadership and the recent disappearance of the twelfth imam. Missionaries (da'is) such as Hamdan Qarmat and Ibn Hawshab spread the network of agents to the area round Kufa in the late 870s, and from there to Yemen (882) and thence India (884), Bahrayn (899), Persia, and the Maghreb (893).

==== The Qarmatian schism and its aftermath ====
In 899, Abdallah al-Akbar's great-grandson, Abdallah, (Note: The mostly hostile Sunni sources call him with the diminutive "Ubayd Allah", probably intended to be pejorative; and his dynasty is hence often called the "Ubaydid" dynasty (Banū ʿUbayd).) became the new head of the movement, and introduced a radical change in the doctrine: no longer was he and his forebears merely the stewards for Muhammad ibn Isma'il, but they were declared to be the rightful imams, and Abdallah himself was the awaited mahdi. Various genealogies were later put forth by the Fatimids to justify this claim by proving their descent from Isma'il ibn Ja'far, but even in pro-Isma'ili sources, the succession and names of imams differ, while Sunni and Twelver sources of course reject any Fatimid descent from the Alids altogether and consider them impostors. Abdallah's claim caused a rift in the Isma'ili movement, as Hamdan Qarmat and other leaders denounced this change and held onto the original doctrine, becoming known as the "Qarmatians", while other communities remained loyal to Salamiya. Shortly after, in 902–903, pro-Fatimid loyalists began a great uprising in Syria. The large-scale Abbasid reaction it precipitated and the attention it brought on him, forced Abdallah to abandon Salamiya for Palestine, Egypt, and finally for the Maghreb, where the da'i Abu Abdallah al-Shi'i had made great headway in converting the Kutama Berbers to the Isma'ili cause. Unable to join his da'i directly, Abdallah instead settled at Sijilmasa sometime between 904 and 905.

=== Rise to power ===
==== Establishment of the Isma'ili State ====
Prior to the Fatimid rise to power, Ifriqiya was under the control of the Aghlabids, an Arab dynasty who ruled nominally on behalf of the Abbasids but were de facto independent. In 893 the dā'ī Abu Abdallah al-Shi'i first settled among the Banu Saktan tribe (part of the larger Kutama tribe) in Ikjan, near the city of Mila (in northeastern Algeria today). However, due to hostility from the local Aghlabid authorities and other Kutuma tribes, he was forced to leave Ikjan and sought the protection of another Kutama tribe, the Banu Ghashman, in Tazrut (two miles southwest of Mila). From there, he began to build support for a new movement. Shortly after, the hostile Kutama tribes and the Arab lords of the nearby cities (Mila, Setif, and Bilizma) allied together to march against him, but he was able to move quickly and muster enough support from friendly Kutama to defeat them one by one before they were able to unite. This first victory brought Abu Abdallah and his Kutama troops valuable loot and attracted more support to the dā'ī's cause. Over the next two years Abu Abdallah was able to win over most of the Kutama tribes in the region through either persuasion or coercion. This left much of the countryside under his control, while the major cities remained under Aghlabid control. He established an Isma'ili theocratic state based in Tazrut, operating in a way similar to previous Isma'ili missionary networks in Mesopotamia but adapted to local Kutama tribal structures. He adopted the role of a traditional Islamic ruler at the head of this organisation while remaining in frequent contact with Abdallah. He continued to preach to his followers, known as the Awliya' Allah ('Friends of God'), and to initiate them into Isma'ili doctrine.

==== Conquest of Aghlabid Ifriqiya ====
Map of Abu Abdallah's campaigns and battles during the overthrow of the Aghlabids

In 902, while the Aghlabid emir Ibrahim II was away on campaign in Sicily, Abu Abdallah struck the first significant blow against Aghlabid authority in Ifriqiya by attacking and capturing the city of Mila for the first time. This news triggered a serious response from the Aghlabids, who sent a punitive expedition of 12,000 men from Tunis in October of the same year. Abu Abdallah's forces were unable to resist this counterattack and after two defeats they evacuated Tazrut (which was largely unfortified) and fled to Ikjan, leaving Mila to be retaken. Ikjan became the new centre of the Fatimid movement and the dā'ī reestablished his network of missionaries and spies.

Ibrahim II died in October 902 while in southern Italy and was succeeded by Abdallah II. In early 903 Abdallah II set out on another expedition to destroy Ikjan and the Kutama rebels, but he ended the expedition prematurely due to troubles at home arising from disputes over his succession. On 27 July 903, he was assassinated and his son Ziyadat Allah III took power in Tunis. These internal Aghlabid troubles gave Abu Abdallah the opportunity to recapture Mila and then go on to capture Setif, another fortified city, by October or November 904. In 905 the Aghlabids sent a third expedition to try and subdue the Kutama. They based themselves in Constantine and in the fall of 905, after receiving further reinforcements, set out to march against Abu Abdallah. However, they were surprised by Kutama forces on the first day of their march, which caused a panic and scattered their army. The Aghlabid general fled and the Kutama captured a large booty. Another Aghlabid military expedition organised the next year (906) failed when the soldiers mutinied. Around the same time or soon after, Abu Abdallah's forces besieged and captured the fortified cities of Tubna and Bilizma. The capture of Tubna was significant as it was the first major commercial centre to come under Abu Abdallah's control.

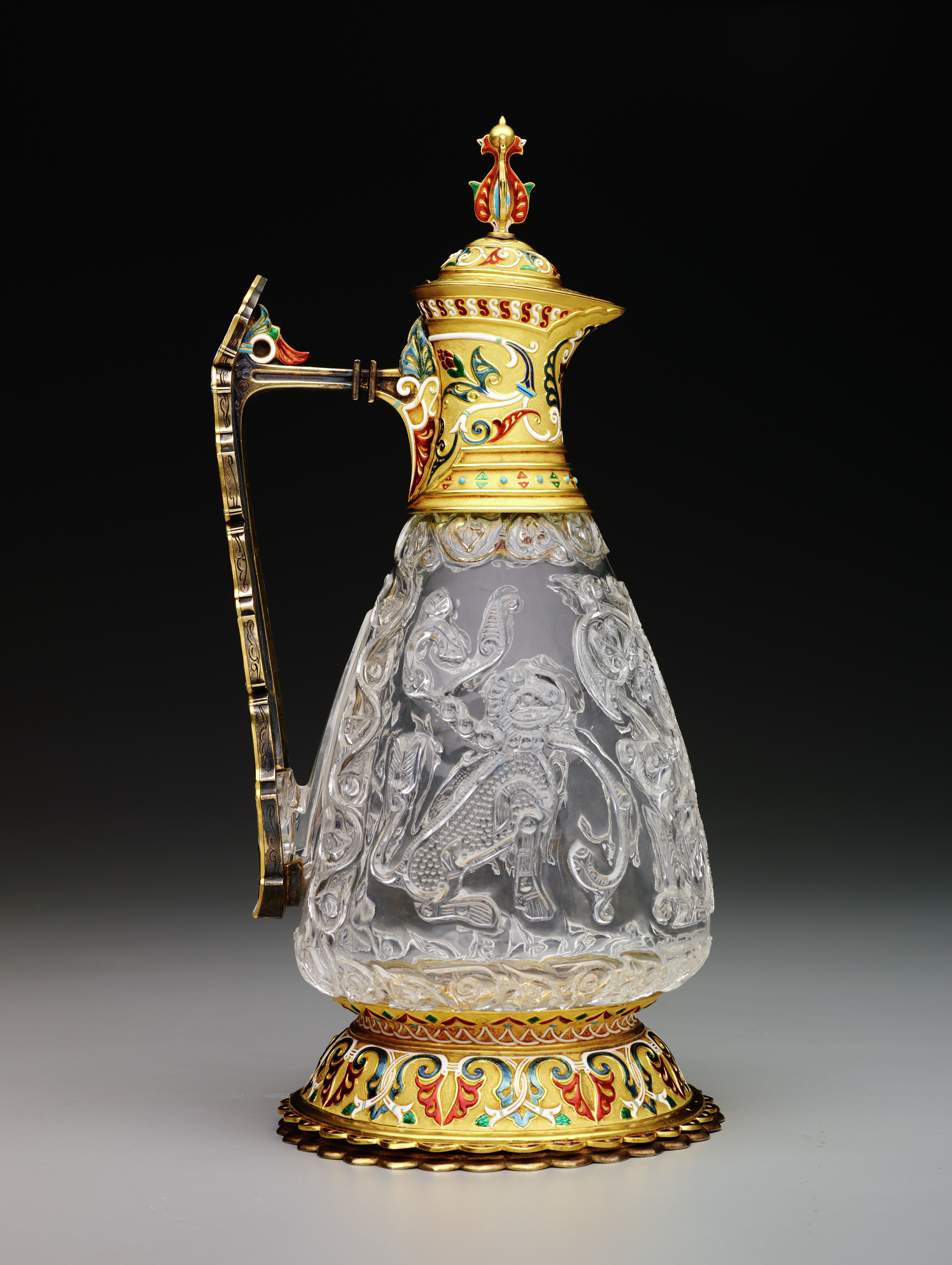
Fatimid ewer, 10th century CE

Meanwhile, Ziyadat Allah III moved his court from Tunis to Raqqada, the palace-city near Kairouan, in response to the growing threat. He fortified Raqqada in 907. In early 907 another Aghlabid army marched westwards again against Abu Abdallah, accompanied by Berber reinforcements from the Aurès Mountains. They were again scattered by Kutama cavalry and retreated to Baghaya, the most fortified town on the old southern Roman road between Ifriqiya and the central Maghreb. The fortress, however, fell to the Kutama without a siege when local notables arranged to have the gates opened to them in May or June 907. This opened a hole in the wider defensive system of Ifriqiya and created panic in Raqqada. Ziyadat Allah III stepped up anti-Fatimid propaganda, recruited volunteers, and took measures to defend the weakly fortified city of Kairouan. He spent the winter of 907–908 with his army in al-Aribus (Roman-era Laribus, between present-day El Kef and Maktar), expecting an attack from the north. However, Abu Abdallah's forces had been unable to capture the northerly city of Constantine and therefore they instead attacked along the southern road from Baghaya in early 908 and captured Maydara (present-day Haïdra). An indecisive battle subsequently occurred between the Aghalabid and Kutama armies near Dar Madyan (probably a site between Sbeitla and Kasserine), with neither side gaining the upper hand. During the winter of 908–909 Abu Abdallah campaigned in the region around Chott el-Jerid, capturing the towns of Tozeur, Nafta, and Qafsa (Gafsa) and taking control of the region. The Aghlabids responded by besieging Baghaya soon afterward in the same winter, but they were quickly repelled.

On 25 February 909, Abu Abdallah set out from Ikjan with an army of 200,000 men for a final invasion of Kairouan. The remaining Aghlabid army, led by an Aghlabid prince named Ibrahim Ibn Abi al-Aghlab, met them near al-Aribus on 18 March. The battle lasted until the afternoon, when a contingent of Kutama horsemen managed to outflank the Aghlabid army and finally caused a rout. When news of the defeat reached Raqqada, Ziyadat Allah III packed his valuable treasures and fled towards Egypt. The population of Kairouan looted the abandoned palaces of Raqqada and resisted Ibn Abi al-Aghlab's calls to organise a last-ditch resistance. Upon hearing of the looting, Abu Abdallah sent an advance force of Kutama horsemen who secured Raqqada on 24 March. On 25 March 909 (Saturday, 1 Rajab 296), Abu Abdallah himself entered Raqqada and took up residence here.

==== Establishment of the Caliphate ====
Upon assuming power in Raqqada, Abu Abdallah inherited much of the Aghlabid state's apparatus and allowed its former officials to continue working for the new regime. He established a new, Isma'ili Shi'a regime on behalf of his absent, and for the moment unnamed, master. He then led his army west to Sijilmasa, whence he led Abdallah in triumph to Raqqada, which he entered on 15 January 910. There Abdallah publicly proclaimed himself as caliph with the regnal name of al-Mahdī, and presented his son and heir, with the regnal name of al-Qa'im. Al-Mahdi quickly fell out with Abu Abdallah: not only was the dā'ī over-powerful, but he demanded proof that the new caliph was the true mahdī. The elimination of Abu Abdallah al-Shi'i and his brother led to an uprising among the Kutama, led by a child-mahdī, which was suppressed. At the same time, al-Mahdi repudiated the millenarian hopes of his followers and curtailed their antinomian tendencies.

The new regime regarded its presence in Ifriqiya as only temporary: the real target was Baghdad, the capital of the Fatimids' Abbasid rivals. The ambition to carry the revolution eastward had to be postponed after the failure of two successive invasions of Egypt, led by al-Qa'im, in 914–915 and 919–921. In addition, the Fatimid regime was as yet unstable. The local population were mostly adherents of Maliki Sunnism and various Kharijite sects such as Ibadism, so that the real power base of Fatimids in Ifriqiya was quite narrow, resting on the Kutama soldiery, later extended by the Sanhaja Berber tribes as well. The historian Heinz Halm describes the early Fatimid state as being, in essence, "a hegemony of the Kutama and Sanhaja Berbers over the eastern and central Maghrib".

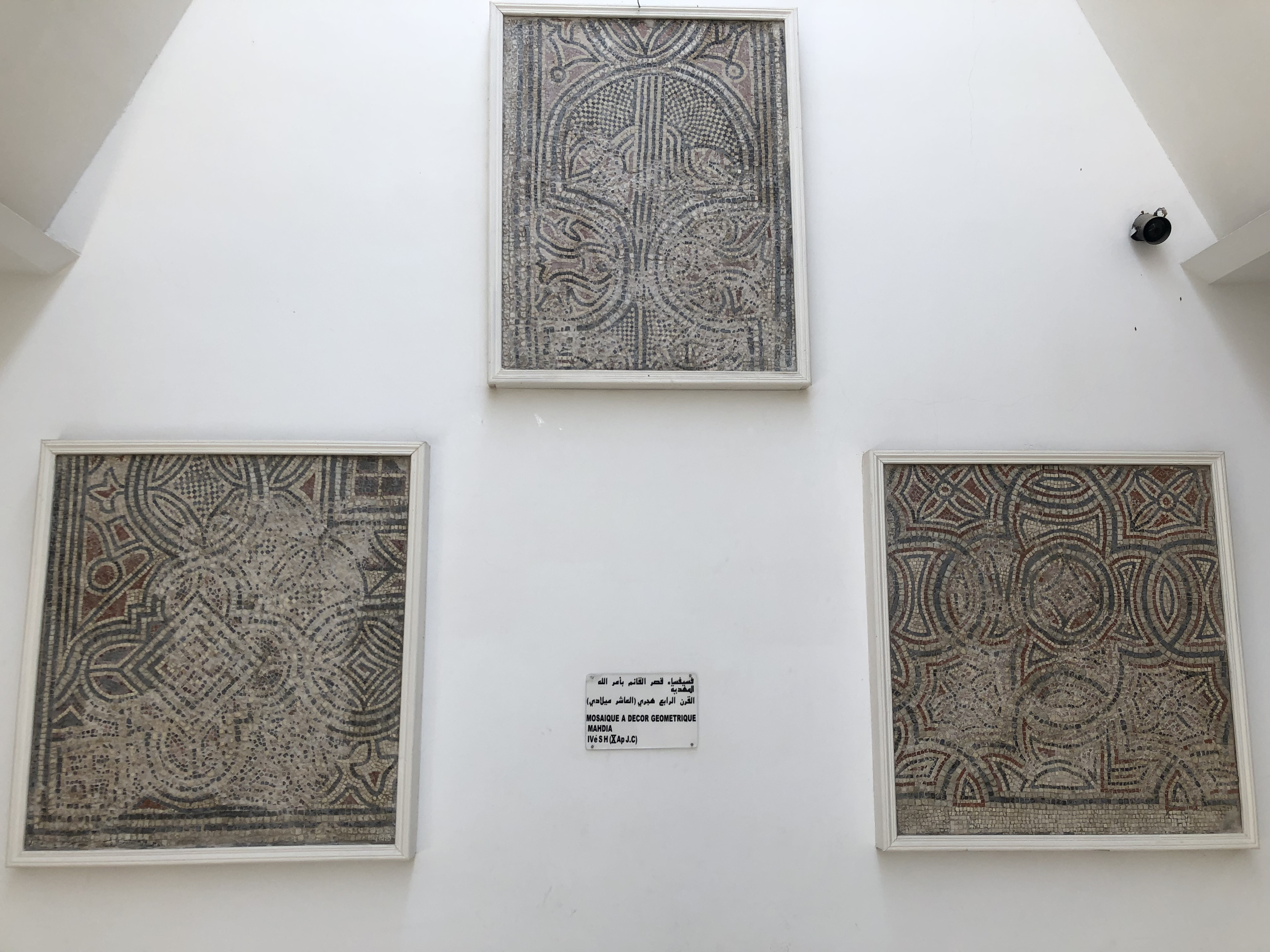
Fragments of mosaic pavement from the palace of al-Qa'im in al-Mahdiyya (Mahdia), on display at the Mahdia Museum

In 912, al-Mahdi began looking for the site of a new capital along the Mediterranean shore. Construction of the new fortified palace city, al-Mahdiyya, began in 916. The new city was officially inaugurated on 20 February 921, though construction continued after this. The new capital was removed from the Sunni stronghold of Kairouan, allowing for the establishment of a secure base for the Caliph and his Kutama forces without raising further tensions with the local population.

The Fatimids also inherited the Aghlabid province of Sicily, which the Aghlabids had gradually conquered from the Byzantine Empire starting in 827. The conquest was generally completed when the last Christian stronghold, Taormina, was conquered by Ibrahim II in 902. However, some Christian or Byzantine resistance continued in some spots in the northeast of Sicily until 967, and the Byzantines still held territories in southern Italy, where the Aghlabids had also campaigned. This ongoing confrontation with the traditional foe of the Islamic world provided the Fatimids with a prime opportunity for propaganda, in a setting where geography gave them the advantage. Sicily itself proved troublesome, and only after a rebellion under Ibn Qurhub was subdued, was Fatimid authority on the island consolidated.

=== Consolidation and western rivalry ===
Overall Fatimid control in Africa in the 10th century

For a large part of the tenth century the Fatimids also engaged in a rivalry with the Umayyads of Córdoba, who ruled al-Andalus and were hostile to the Fatimids' pretensions in an effort to establish domination over the western Maghreb. In 911, Tahert, which had been briefly captured by Abu Abdallah al-Shi'i in 909, had to be retaken by the Fatimid general Masala ibn Habus of the Miknasa tribe. The first Fatimid expeditions to what is now northern Morocco occurred in 917 and 921 and were primarily aimed at the Principality of Nakur, which they subjugated on both occasions. Fez and Sijilmasa were also captured in 921. These two expeditions were led by Masala ibn Habus, who had been made governor of Tahert. Thereafter, the weakened Idrisids and various local Zenata and Sanhaja leaders acted as proxies whose formal allegiances oscillated between the Umayyads or the Fatimids depending on the circumstances. As a result of the political instability in the western Maghreb, effective Fatimid control did not extend much beyond the former territory of the Aghlabids. Masala's successor, Musa ibn Abi'l-Afiya, captured Fez from the Idrisids again, but in 932 defected to the Umayyads, taking the western Maghreb with him.

All this warfare in the Maghreb and Sicily necessitated the maintenance of a strong army, and a capable fleet as well. Nevertheless, by the time of al-Mahdi's death in 934, the Fatimid Caliphate "had become a great power in the Mediterranean". The reign of the second Fatimid imam-caliph, al-Qa'im, was dominated by the Kharijite rebellion of Abu Yazid. Starting in 943/4 among the Zenata Berbers, the uprising spread through Ifriqiya, taking Kairouan and blockading al-Qa'im at al-Mahdiyya, which was besieged in January–September 945. Al-Qa'im died during the siege, but this was kept secret by his son and successor, Isma'il, until he had defeated Abu Yazid; he then announced his father's death and proclaimed himself imam and caliph as al-Mansur. While al-Mansur was campaigning to suppress the last remnants of the revolt, a new palace city was being constructed for him south of Kairouan. Construction began around 946 and it was only fully completed under al-Mansur's son and successor, al-Mu'izz. It was named al-Mansuriyya (also known as Sabra al-Mansuriyya) and became the new seat of the caliphate.

==== Fatimid campaigns against the Byzantines in Italy and the Umayyads of Spain ====
The Umayyads of Spain gained the upper hand again in northern Morocco during the 950s. From 949 the Idrisid princes of Fez and the Banu Ifran of Tlemcen had submitted to the Umayyads. While at peace with the kingdom of León and Count González of Castile, the Umayyads seized a Fatimid ship sailing from Sicily to Tunis. In retaliation, in 955 Caliph al-Muʿizz sent the Sicilian fleet under governor al-Ḥasan to raid the Almería region. The Umayyads responded in 956 with a landing at Mersa-el-Kharez (El Kala) under the emir Ghālib, who ravaged the country as far as Tabarka.

Accompanied by Zirid leader Ziri ibn Manad, the Fatimid general Jawhar al-Siqillī lit. '(“the Sicilian”)' , led another major expedition to Morocco in 958 and spent two years subjugating most of northern Morocco on behalf of Caliph Al-Mu'izz li-Din Allah. Reinforced by Ziri ibn Manad, Jawhar defeated the Banu Ifran leader Yala ibn Muhammad near Tahert but failed before Fez, which was held by Umayyad troops. He then took Sijilmassa from the Midrarid Muhammad ibn al-fath before advancing to the Atlantic. The Idrisids of the Rif submitted and their prince Hassan ibn Jannun was given command of the Ghomara country. With the help of Ziri, Jawhar's forces took Fez in November 960. He was unable, however, to dislodge the Umayyad garrisons in Sala, Sebta (present-day Ceuta) and Tangier, marking the only time that the Fatimid army was present at the Strait of Gibraltar. Having restored Fatimid authority, Jawhar enlarged Ziri’s governorship on the caliph's behalf with Tahert and most of the central Maghreb (Algeria), then both returned to al-Mansuriyya in 960.

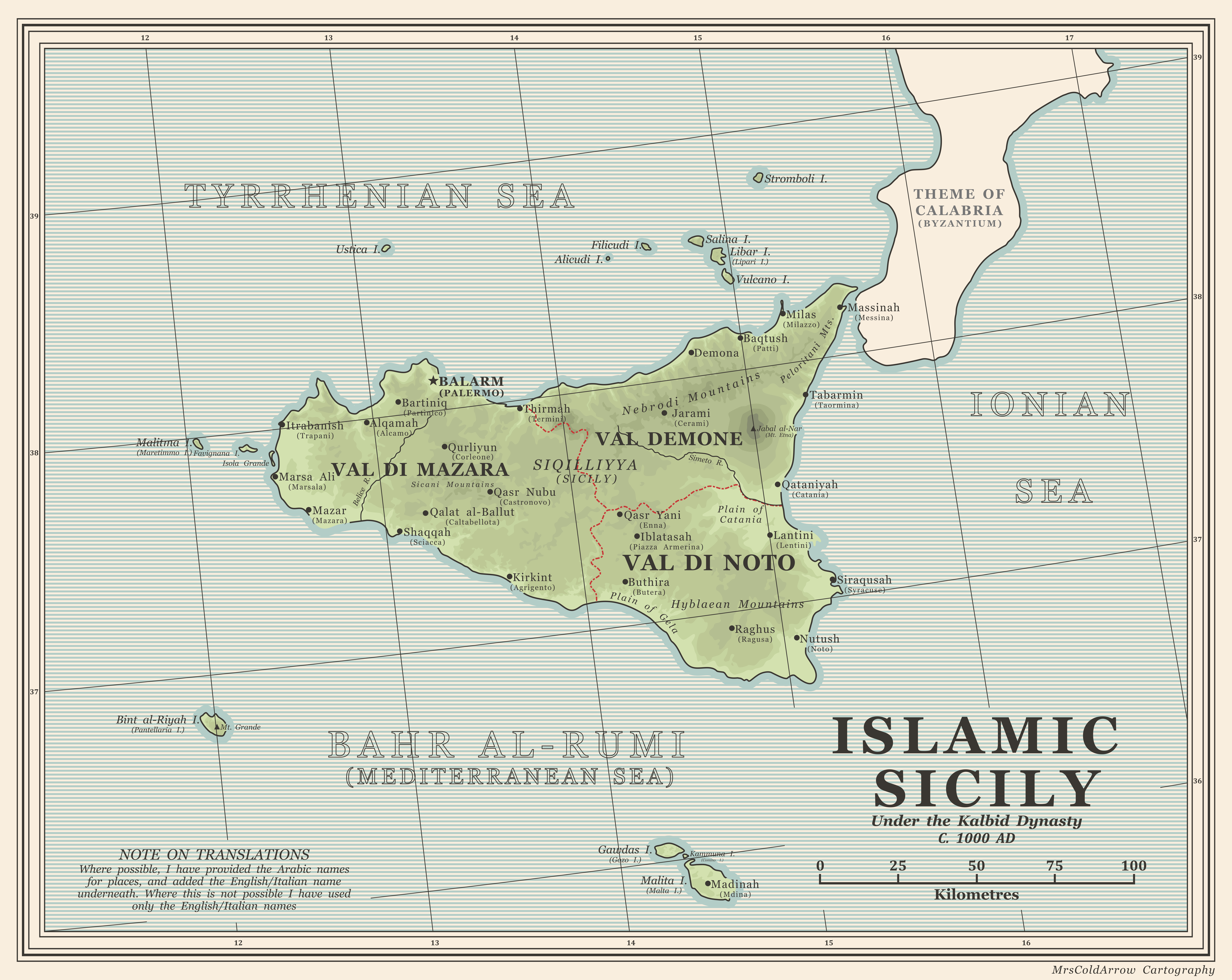
Map of Islamic Sicily under the Kalbid Dynasty c.1000 AD

In 956, Emperor Constantine VII sent the patrician Argirius to besiege Naples, an ally of the Muslims. Ammar ibn Ali al-Kalbi, brother of the emir Hasan, created a diversion in Calabria that relieved the city. In 957 the Byzantines captured Reggio, destroyed the mosque built by Hasan, and briefly landed in Sicily before withdrawing to Italy after clashing with the emir’s forces. In 957 Hasan joined Ammar in Calabria, resisted the Byzantine fleet off Otranto, and in 958 forced a truce on the emperor. However, the Byzantine attack on Crete resumed hostilities and a new army led by Ammar besieged Taormina, capturing it in 962.

By this time the Fatimids controlled almost all of Sicily; the only remaining Christian stronghold, Rometta, was under siege by Hasan. In 964 Emperor Nikephoros Phokas sent a 40,000-man army under his nephew Manuel and the admiral Niketas to reconquer Sicily. Manuel’s attempt to relieve Rometta ended in disaster on 24 October 964, as he was killed and 10,000 of his men perished. The survivors fled toward their fleet at Messina, only to be ambushed and defeated in the Battle of the Straits. Hasan died the following month. His son Ahmad stormed Rametta in November 965, massacred the garrison, and sent the women and children into slavery in Africa. Shortly afterward he burned the Byzantine fleet at Reggio, captured Niketas and his officers (who were taken to Mahdia), and forced the Greek cities of Calabria to pay tribute. These victories cemented Fatimid reputation and paved the way for their conquest of Egypt. The Fatimids would continue to launch attacks and raids on southern Italy, leading to a major battle between Muslim and Christian forces in 982 at Cape Colonna, where a Fatimid-Kalbid army defeated an army under Otto II (Holy Roman Emperor and King of Germany). A large number of German nobles and churchmen dying during and after the battle; The Emir of Sicily Abu'l-Qasim was also killed in the battle.

=== Apogee ===
==== Conquest of Egypt and transfer of the Caliphate to Cairo ====
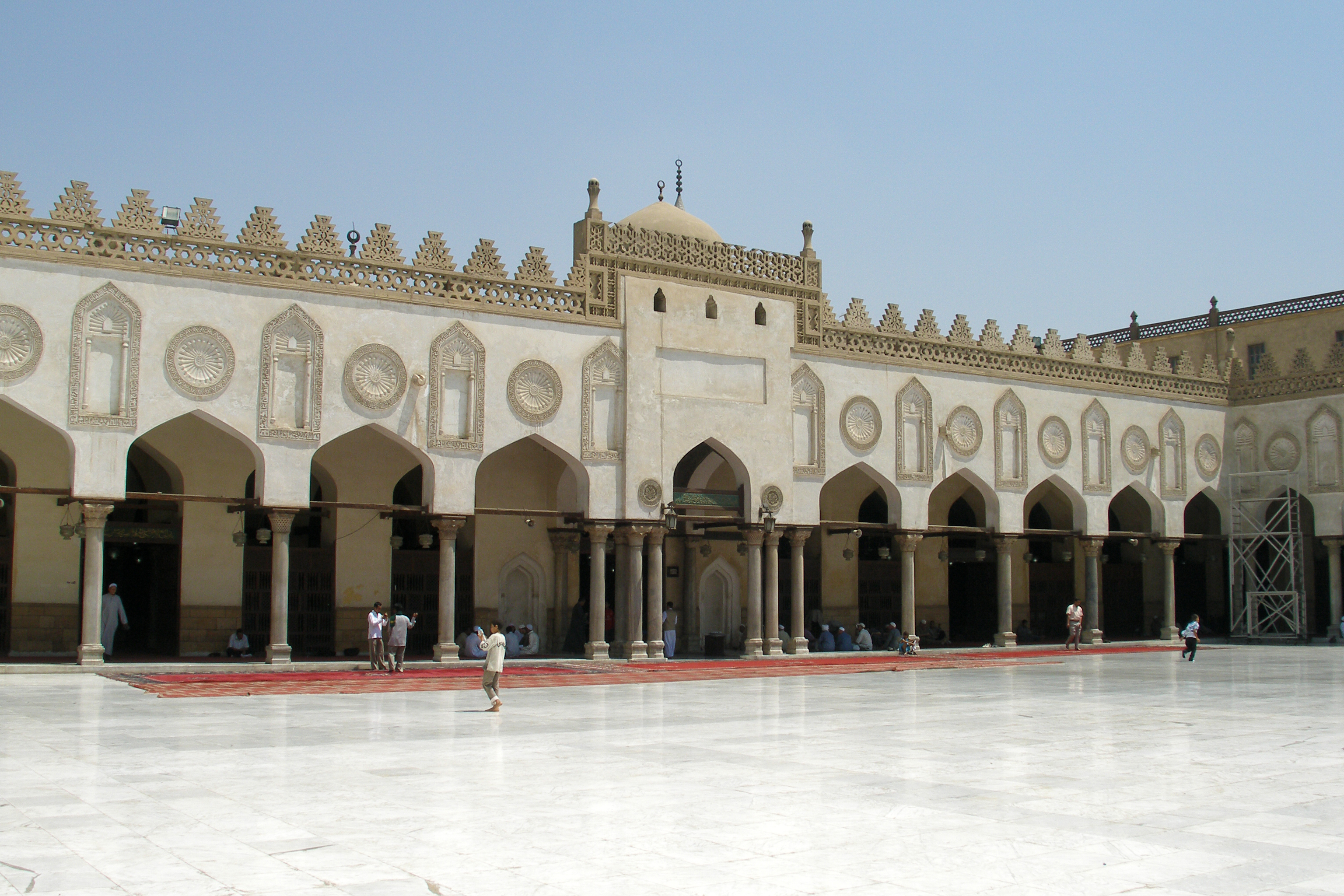
Al-Azhar Mosque in Cairo, built by the Fatimids between 970 and 972

In 969, Jawhar launched a carefully prepared and successful invasion of Egypt, which had been under the control of the Ikhshidids, another regional dynasty whose formal allegiance was to the Abbasids. Al-Mu'izz had given Jawhar specific instructions to carry out after the conquest, and one of his first actions was to found a new capital named al-Qahira (Cairo) in 969. The name al-Qahira, meaning "the Vanquisher" or "the Conqueror", referenced the planet Mars, "The Subduer", rising in the sky at the time when the construction of the city started. The city was located several miles northeast of Fustat, the older regional capital founded by the Arab conquerors in the seventh century.

Control of Egypt was secured with relative ease and soon afterward, in 970, Jawhar sent a force to invade Syria and remove the remaining Ikhshidids who had fled there from Egypt. This Fatimid force was led by a Kutama general named Ja'far ibn Falah. This invasion was successful at first and many cities, including Damascus, were occupied that same year. Ja'far's next step was to attack the Byzantines, who had captured Antioch and subjugated Aleppo in 969 (around the same time as Jawhar was arriving in Egypt), but he was forced to call off the advance in order to face a new threat from the east. The Qarmatis of Bahrayn, responding to the appeal of the recently defeated leaders of Damascus, had organised a large coalition of Arab tribesmen to attack him. Ja'far chose to confront them in the desert in August 971, but his army was surrounded and defeated and Ja'far himself was killed. A month later the Qarmati imam Hasan al-A'ṣam led the army, with new reinforcements from Transjordan, into Egypt, seemingly without opposition. The Qarmatis spent time occupying the Nile Delta region, which gave Jawhar time to organise a defence of Fustat and Cairo. The Qarmati advance was halted just north of the city and eventually routed. A Kalbid relief force arriving by sea secured the expulsion of the Qarmatis from Egypt. Ramla, the capital of Palestine, was retaken by the Fatimids in May 972, but otherwise the progress in Syria had been lost.

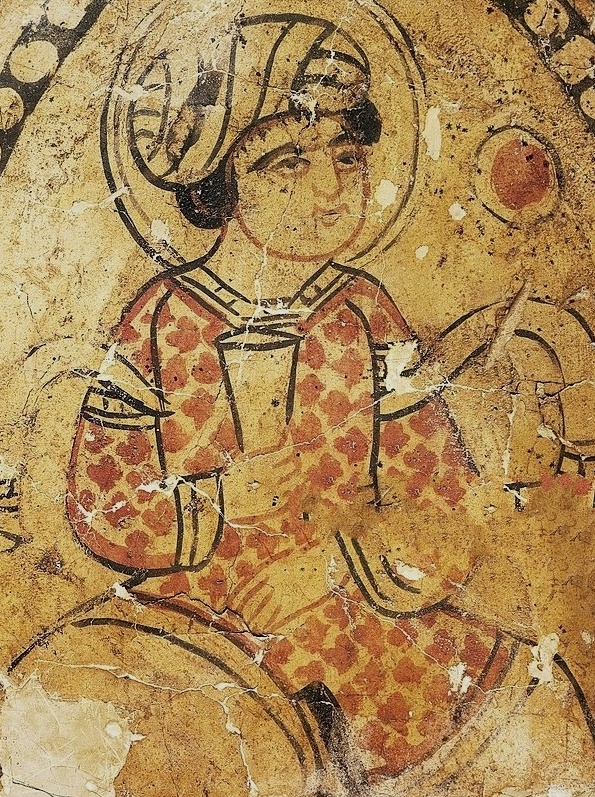
Architectural fragment from a bathhouse in al-Fustat, 11th century CE (pre-1168 CE). Museum of Islamic Art, Cairo, 12880.

Once Egypt was sufficiently pacified and the new capital was ready, Jawhar sent for al-Mu'izz in Ifriqiya. The caliph, his court, and his treasury, departed from al-Mansuriyya in fall 972, travelling by land but shadowed by the Fatimid navy sailing along the coast. After making triumphant stops in major cities along the way, the caliph arrived in Cairo on 10 June 973. Like other royal capitals before it, Cairo was constructed as an administrative and palatine city, housing the palaces of the caliph and the official state mosque, Al-Azhar Mosque. In 988, the mosque also became an academic institution that was central in the dissemination of Isma'ili teachings. Until the last years of the Fatimid Caliphate, the economic centre of Egypt remained Fustat, where most of the general population lived and traded.

Under the Fatimids, Egypt became the centre of an empire that included at its peak parts of North Africa, Sicily, the Levant (including Transjordan), the Red Sea coast of Africa, Tihamah, Hejaz, Yemen, with its most remote territorial reach being Emirate of Multan (in modern-day Pakistan). Egypt flourished, and the Fatimids developed an extensive trade network both in the Mediterranean and in the Indian Ocean. Their trade and diplomatic ties, extending all the way to China under the Song dynasty (r. 960–1279), eventually determined the economic course of Egypt during the High Middle Ages. The Fatimid focus on agriculture further increased their riches and allowed the dynasty and the Egyptians to flourish. The use of cash crops and the propagation of the flax trade allowed Fatimids to import other items from various parts of the world. The Fatimids built upon some of the bureaucratic foundations laid by the Ikhshidids and the old Abbasid imperial order. The office of the wazir (vizier), which existed under the Ikhshidids, was soon revived under the Fatimids. The first to be appointed to this position was the Jewish convert Ya'qub ibn Killis, who was elevated to this office in 979 by al-Mu'izz's successor al-Aziz. The office of the vizier became progressively more important over the years, as the vizier became the intermediary between the caliph and the large bureaucratic state that he ruled.

==== Campaigns in Syria ====
Map of Western Asia (970-1070), including the Fatimid Caliphate (green) and other rival policies in the middle east.

In 975, the Byzantine emperor John Tzimisces retook most of Palestine and Syria, leaving only Tripoli in Fatimid control. He aimed to capture Jerusalem, but he died in 976 on his way back to Constantinople, thus staving off the Byzantine threat to the Fatimids. Meanwhile, the Turkish ghulam (plural: ghilman, meaning soldiers recruited as slaves) Aftakin, a Buyid refugee who had fled an unsuccessful rebellion in Baghdad with his own contingent of Turkish soldiers, became the protector of Damascus. He allied with the Qarmatis and with Arab Bedouin tribes in Syria and invaded Palestine in the spring of 977. Jawhar, once again called into action, repelled their invasion and besieged Damascus. However, he suffered a rout during the winter and was forced to hold out in Ascalon against Aftakin. When his Kutama soldiers mutinied in April 978, Caliph al-Aziz himself led an army to relieve him. Instead of returning to Damascus, Aftakin and his Turkish ghilman joined the Fatimid army and became a useful instrument in the Syrian effort.

After Ibn Killis became vizier in 979, the Fatimids changed tactics. Ibn Killis was able to subjugate most of Palestine and southern Syria (the former Ikhshidid territories) by paying off the Qarmatis with an annual tribute and making alliances with local tribes and dynasties, such as the Jarrahids and the Banu Kilab. Following another failed attempt by a Kutama general, Salman, to take Damascus, the Turkish ghulam Bultakin finally succeeded in occupying the city for the Fatimids in 983, demonstrating the value of this new force. Another ghulam, Bajkur, was appointed governor of Damascus at this time. That same year he tried and failed to take Aleppo, but he was soon able to conquer Raqqa and Rahba in the Euphrates valley (present-day northeast Syria). Cairo eventually judged him to be a little too popular as governor of Damascus and he was forced to move to Raqqa while Munir, a eunuch in the caliph's household (like Jawhar before him), took direct control in Damascus on behalf of the caliph. Further north, Aleppo remained out of reach and under Hamdanid control.

The incorporation of the Turkish troops into the Fatimid army had long-term consequences. On the one hand, they were a necessary addition to the military in order for the Fatimids to compete militarily with other powers in the region. The Fatimids began to recruit ghilman much as the Abbasids had done before them. They were soon joined by recruited Daylamis (footmen from the Buyid homeland in Iran). Black Africans from the Sudan (upper Nile valley) were also recruited afterward. In the short term the Kutama warriors remained the most important troops of the Caliph, but resentment and rivalry eventually grew between the different ethnic components of the army.

Bajkur, based in Raqqa, made another unsuccessful attempt against Aleppo in 991 which resulted in his capture and execution. That same year, Ibn Killis died and Munir was accused of conducting treasonous correspondence with Baghdad. These difficulties triggered a strong response in Cairo. A major military campaign was prepared to impose Fatimid control over all of Syria. Along the way, Munir was arrested in Damascus and sent back to Cairo. Circumstances were favourable to the Fatimids as the Byzantine emperor Basil II was campaigning far away in the Balkans and the Hamdanid ruler Sa'd al-Dawla died in late 991. Manjutakin, the Turkish Fatimid commander, advanced methodically north along the Orontes valley. He took Homs and Hama in 992 and defeated a combined force from Hamdanid Aleppo and Byzantine-held Antioch. In 993 he took Shayzar and in 994 he began the siege of Aleppo. In May 995, however, Basil II unexpectedly arrived in the region after a forced march with his army through Anatolia, forcing Manjutakin to lift the siege and return to Damascus. Before another Fatimid expedition could be sent, Basil II negotiated a one-year truce with the caliph, which the Fatimids used to recruit and build new ships for their fleet. In 996 many of the ships were destroyed by a fire at al-Maqs, the port on the Nile near Fustat, further delaying the expedition. Finally, in August 996 al-Aziz died and the objective of Aleppo became secondary to other concerns.

==== The Zirids in the Maghreb ====
Before leaving for Egypt, al-Mu'izz had installed Buluggin ibn Ziri, the son of Ziri bn Manad (who died in 971), as his viceroy in the Maghreb. This established a dynasty of viceroys, with the title of "amir", who ruled the region on behalf of the Fatimids. Their authority remained disputed in the western Maghreb, where the rivalry with the Umayyads and with local Zenata leaders continued. After Jawhar's successful western expedition, the Umayyads returned to northern Morocco in 973 to reassert their authority. Buluggin launched one last expedition in 979–980 that reestablished his authority in the region temporarily, until a final decisive Umayyad intervention in 984–985 put an end to further efforts. In 978 the caliph also gave Tripolitania to Buluggin to govern, though Zirid authority there was later replaced by the local Banu Khazrun dynasty in 1001.

In 988, Buluggin's son and successor al-Mansur moved the Zirid dynasty's base from Ashir (central Algeria) to the former Fatimid capital al-Mansuriyya, cementing the status of the Zirids as more or less de facto independent rulers of Ifriqiya, while still officially maintaining their allegiance to the Fatimid caliphs. Caliph al-Aziz accepted this situation for pragmatic reasons to maintain his own formal status as universal ruler. Both dynasties exchanged gifts and the succession of new Zirid rulers to the throne was officially sanctioned by the caliph in Cairo.

==== The reign of al-Hakim ====
The Fatimid Caliphate and main Asian polities c. 1000

After al-Aziz's unexpected death, his young son al-Mansur, 11 years old, was installed on the throne as al-Hakim. Hasan ibn Ammar, the leader of the Kalbid clan in Egypt, a military veteran, and one of the last remaining members of al-Mu'izz's old guard, initially became regent, but he was soon forced to flee by Barjawan, the eunuch and tutor of the young al-Hakim, who took power in his stead. Barjawan stabilised the internal affairs of the empire but refrained from pursuing al-Aziz's policy of expansion towards Aleppo. In the year 1000, Barjawan was assassinated by al-Hakim, who now took direct and autocratic control of the state. His reign, which lasted until his mysterious disappearance in 1021, is the most controversial in Fatimid history. Traditional narratives have described him as either eccentric or outright insane, but more recent studies have tried to provide more measured explanations based on the political and social circumstances of the time.

Among other things, al-Hakim was known for executing his officials when unsatisfied with them, seemingly without warning, rather than dismissing them from their posts as had been traditional practice. Many of the executions were members of the financial administration, which may mean that this was al-Hakim's way of trying to impose discipline in an institution rife with corruption. He also opened the Dar al-'Ilm ("House of Knowledge"), a library for the study of the sciences, which was in line with al-Aziz's previous policy of cultivating this knowledge. For the general population, he was noted for being more accessible and willing to receive petitions in person, as well as for riding out in person among the people in the streets of Fustat. On the other hand, he was also known for his capricious decrees aimed at curbing what he saw as public improprieties. He also unsettled the plurality of Egyptian society by imposing new restrictions on Christians and Jews, particularly on the way they dressed or behaved in public. He ordered or sanctioned the destruction of a number of churches and monasteries (mostly Coptic or Melkite), which was unprecedented, and in 1009, for reasons that remain unclear, he ordered the demolition of the Church of the Holy Sephulchre in Jerusalem.

Al-Hakim greatly expanded the recruitment of Black Africans into the army, who subsequently became another powerful faction to balance against the Kutama, Turks, and Daylamis. In 1005, during his early reign, a dangerous uprising led by Abu Rakwa was successfully put down but had come within striking distance of Cairo. In 1012 the leaders of the Arab Tayy tribe occupied Ramla and proclaimed the sharif of Mecca, al-Hasan ibn Ja'far, as the Sunni anti-caliph, but the latter's death in 1013 led to their surrender. Despite his policies against Christians and his demolition of the church in Jerusalem, al-Hakim maintained a ten-year truce with the Byzantines that began in 1001. For most of his reign, Aleppo remained a buffer state that paid tribute to Constantinople. This lasted until 1017, when the Fatimid Armenian general Fatāk finally occupied Aleppo at the invitation of a local commander who had expelled the Hamdanid ghulam ruler Mansur ibn Lu'lu'. After a year or two, however, Fatak made himself effectively independent in Aleppo.

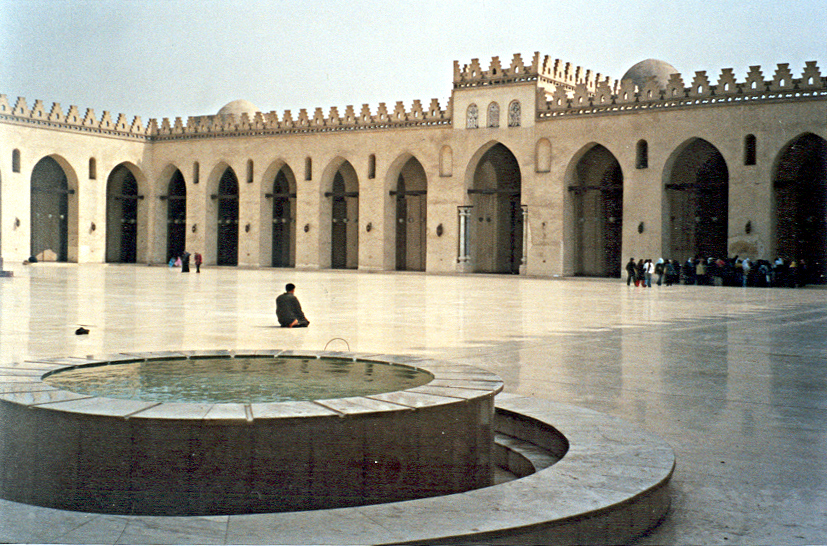
The Al-Hakim Mosque in Cairo, commissioned by al-Aziz in 990 and completed by al-Hakim in 1013 (later renovated in the 1980s by the Dawoodi Bohra)

Al-Hakim also alarmed his Isma'ili followers in several ways. In 1013 he announced the designation of two great-great-grandsons of al-Mahdi as two separate heirs: one, Abd al-Rahim ibn Ilyas, would inherit the title of caliphate as the role of political ruler, and the other, Abbas ibn Shu'ayb, would inherit the imamate or religious leadership. This was a serious departure from a central purpose of the Fatimid Imam-Caliphs, which was to combine these two functions in one person. In 1015 he also suddenly halted the Isma'ili doctrinal lectures of the majalis al-hikma ("sessions of wisdom") which had taken place regularly inside the palace. In 1021, while wandering the desert outside Cairo on one of his nightly excursions, he disappeared. He was purportedly murdered, but his body was never found.

=== Decline ===
==== Losses, successes, and civil war ====
After al-Hakim's death his two designated heirs were killed, putting an end to his succession scheme, and his sister Sitt al-Mulk arranged to have his 15-year-old son Ali installed on the throne as al-Zahir. She served as his regent until her death in 1023, at which point an alliance of courtiers and officials ruled, with al-Jarjara'i, a former finance official, at their head. Fatimid control in Syria was threatened during the 1020s. In Aleppo, Fatak, who had declared his independence, was killed and replaced in 1022, but this opened the way for a coalition of Bedouin chiefs from the Banu Kilab, Jarrahids, and Banu Kalb led by Salih ibn Mirdas to take the city in 1024 or 1025 and to begin imposing their control on the rest of Syria. Al-Jarjara'i sent Anushtakin al-Dizbari, a Turkish commander, with a force that defeated them in 1029 at the Battle of Uqhuwana near Lake Tiberias. In 1030 the new Byzantine emperor Romanos III broke a truce to invade northern Syria and forced Aleppo to recognise his suzerainty. His death in 1034 changed the situation again and in 1036 peace was restored. In 1038 Aleppo was directly annexed by the Fatimids state for the first time.

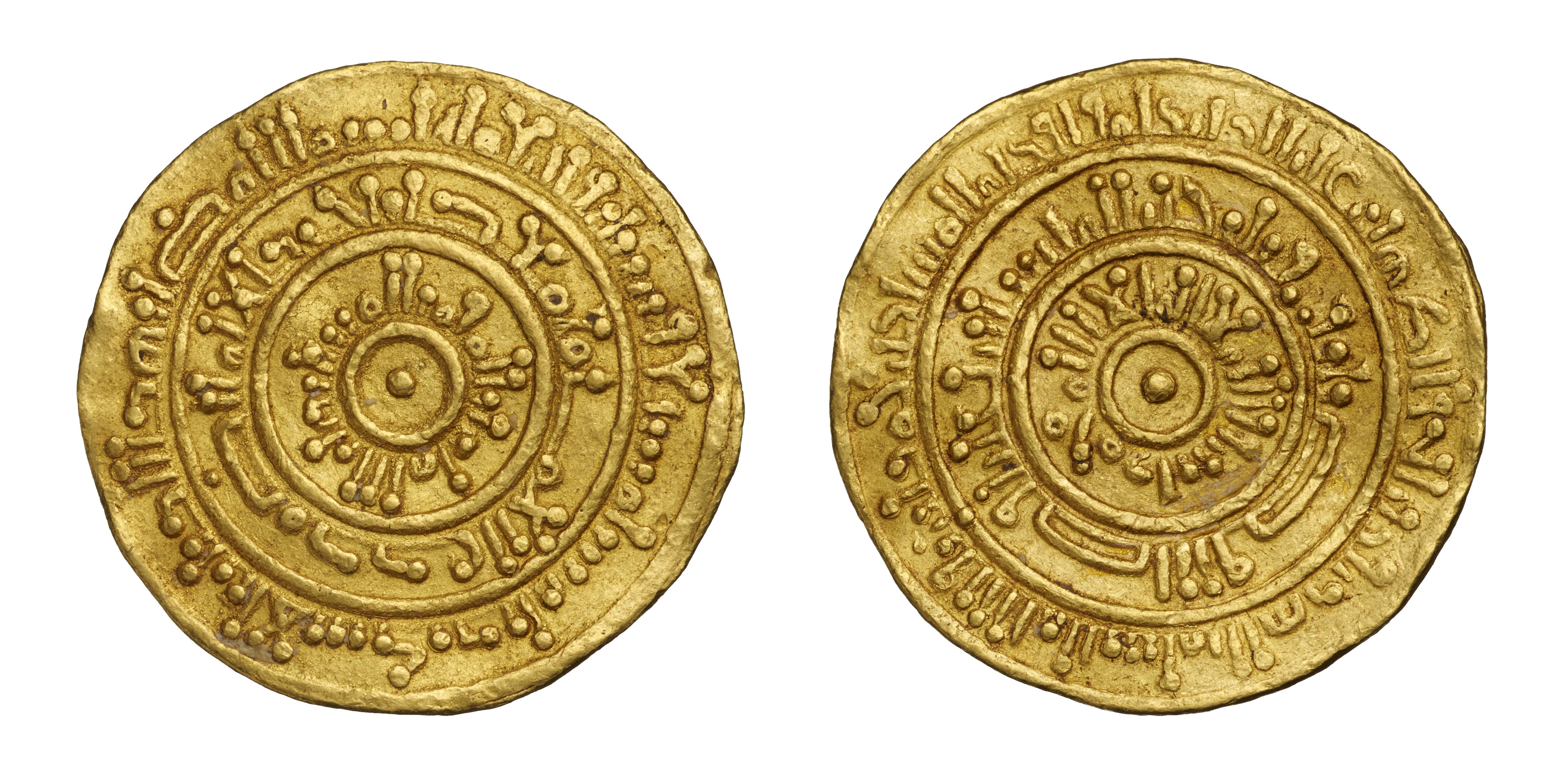
Fatimid gold dinar minted during the reign of al-Mustansir Billah (1036–1094)

Al-Zahir died in 1036 and was succeeded by his son, al-Mustansir, who had the longest reign in Fatimid history, serving as caliph from 1036 to 1094. However, he remained largely uninvolved in politics and left the government in the hands of others. He was seven years old at his accession and thus al-Jarjara'i continued to serve as vizier and his guardian. When al-Jarjara'i died in 1045 a series of court figures ran the government until al-Yazuri, a jurist of Palestinian origin, took and kept the office of vizier from 1050 to 1058.

In the 1040s (possibly in 1041 or 1044), the Zirids declared their independence from the Fatimids and recognised the Sunni Abbasid caliphs of Baghdad, which led the Fatimids to launch the devastating Banu Hilal invasions of North Africa. Fatimid suzerainty over Sicily also faded as the Muslim polity there fragmented and external attacks increased. By 1060, when the Italo-Norman Roger I began his conquest of the island (completed in 1091), the Kalbid dynasty, along with any Fatimid authority, were already gone.

There was more success in the east, however. In 1047, the Fatimid da'i Ali Muhammad al-Sulayhi in Yemen built a fortress and recruited tribes with which he was able to capture San'a in 1048. In 1060, he began a campaign to conquer all of Yemen, capturing Aden and Zabid. In 1062 he marched on Mecca, where Shukr ibn Abi al-Futuh's death in 1061 provided an excuse. Along the way he forced the Zaydi Imam in Sa'da into submission. Upon arriving in Mecca, he installed Abu Hashim Muhammad ibn Ja'far as the new sharif and custodian of the holy sites under the suzerainty of the Fatimids. He returned to San'a where he established his family as rulers on behalf of the Fatimid caliphs. His brother founded the city of Ta'izz, while the city of Aden became an important hub of trade between Egypt and India, which brought Egypt further wealth. His rise to power established the Sulayhid dynasty which continued to rule Yemen as nominal vassals of the Fatimids after this.

Events degenerated in Egypt and Syria, however. Starting in 1060, various local leaders began to break away or challenge Fatimid dominion in Syria. While the ethnic-based army was generally successful on the battlefield, it had begun to have negative effects on Fatimid internal politics. Traditionally, the Kutama element of the army had the strongest sway over political affairs, but as the Turkish element grew more powerful it began to challenge this. In 1062, the tentative balance between the different ethnic groups within the Fatimid army collapsed and they quarrelled constantly or fought each other in the streets. At the same time, Egypt suffered a seven-year period of drought and famine known as the Mustansirite Hardship. Viziers came and went in a flurry, the bureaucracy broke down, and the caliph was unable or unwilling to assume responsibilities in their absence. Declining resources accelerated the problems among the different ethnic factions and outright civil war began, primarily between the Turks under Nasir al-Dawla ibn Hamdan, a scion of the Hamdanids of Aleppo, and Black African troops, while the Berbers shifted alliance between the two sides. The Turkish faction under Nasir al-Dawla seized partial control of Cairo but their leader was not given any official title. In 1067–1068, they plundered the state treasury and then looted any treasures they could find in the palaces. The Turks turned against Nasir al-Dawla in 1069 but he managed to rally Bedouin tribes to his side, took over most of the Nile Delta region, and blocked supplies and food from reaching the capital from this region. Things degenerated further for the general population, especially in the capital, which relied on the countryside for food. Historical sources of this period report extreme hunger and hardship in the city, even to the point of cannibalism. The depredations in the Nile Delta may have also been a turning point that accelerated the long-term decline of the Coptic community in Egypt.

==== Badr al-Jamali and the Fatimid revival ====
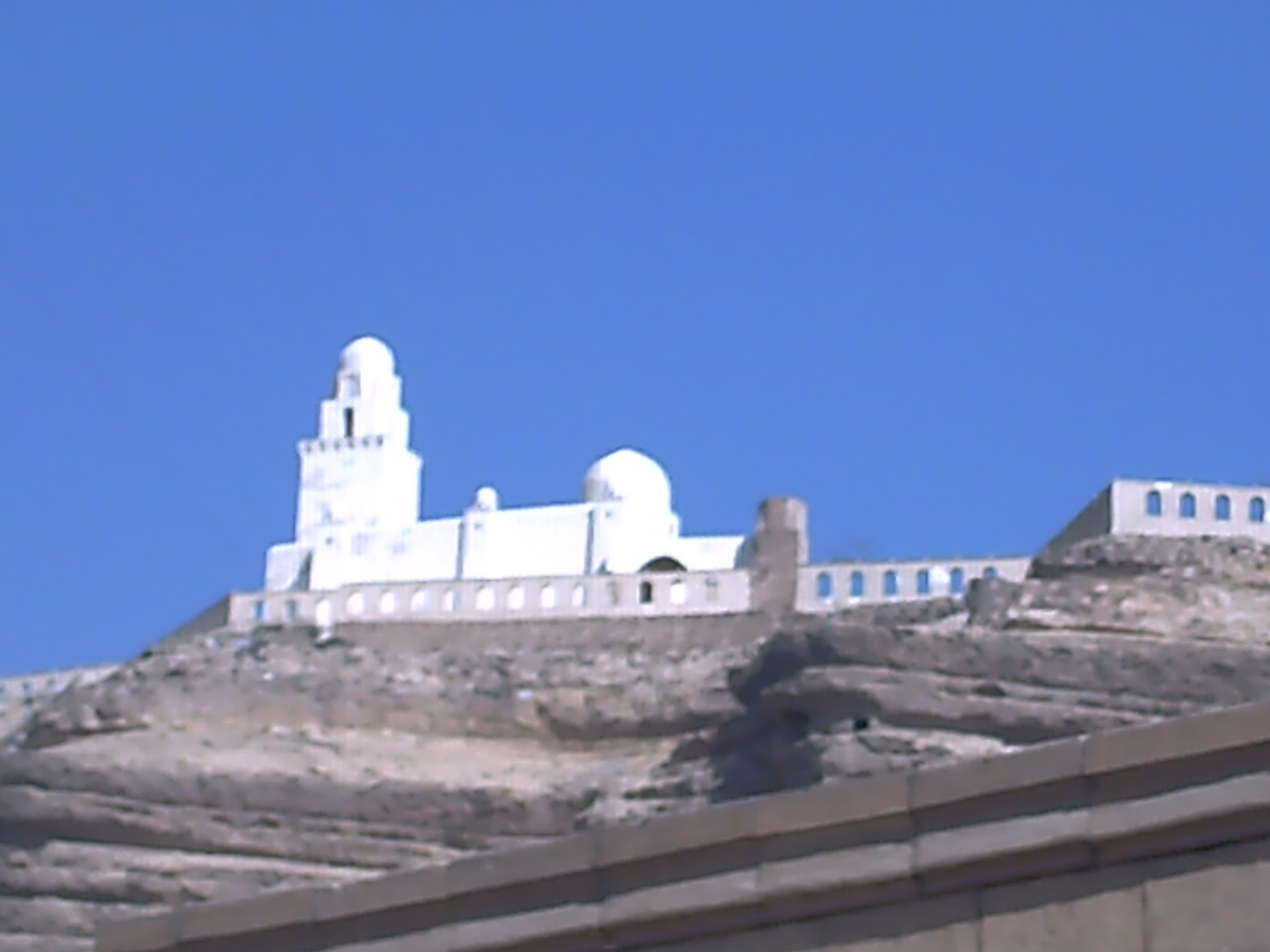
Al-Juyushi Mosque, Cairo, overlooking the city from the Muqattam Hills

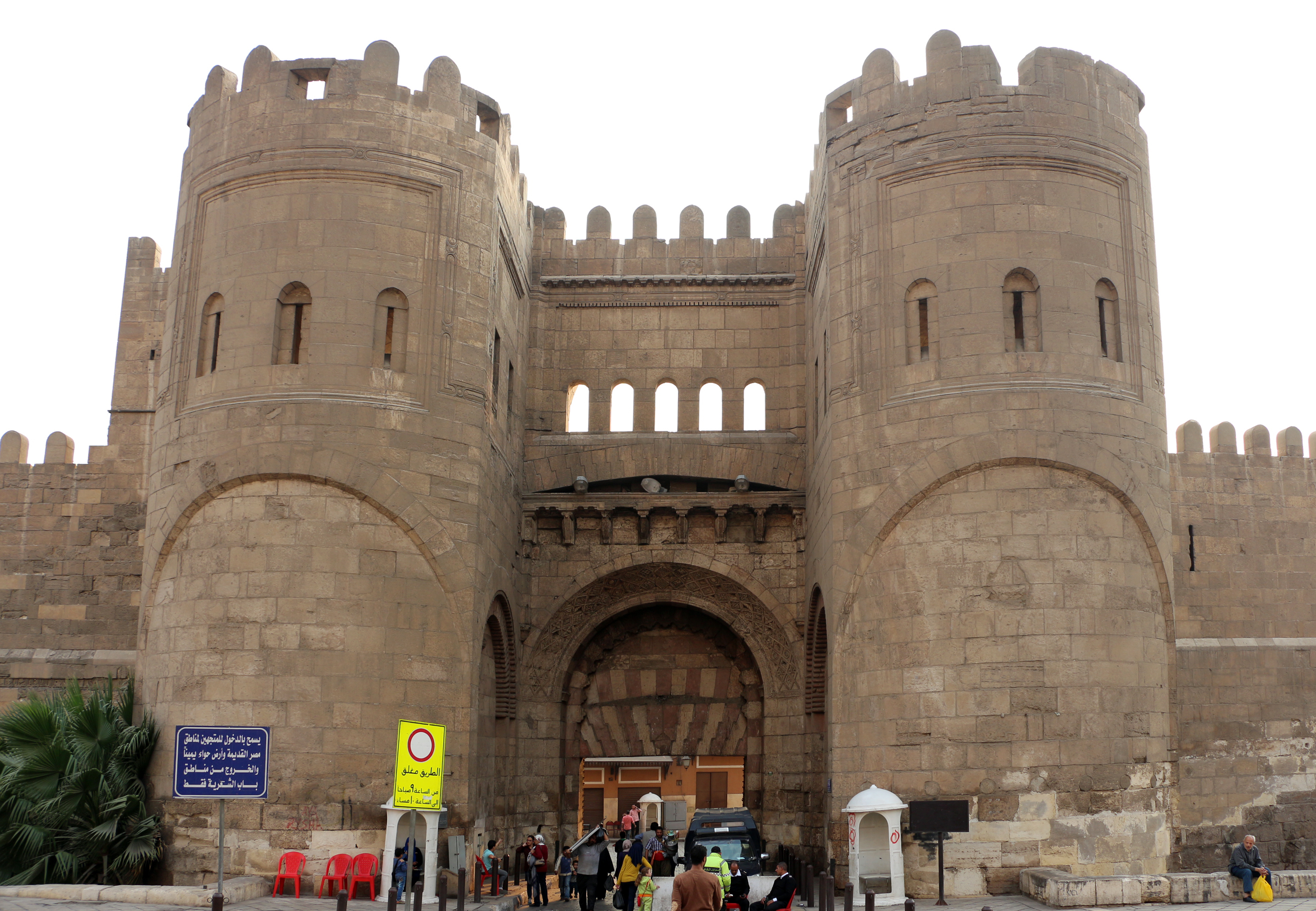
Bab al-Futuh, one of the gates of Cairo dating from Badr al-Jamali's reconstruction of the city walls (1987)

By 1072, in a desperate attempt to save Egypt, al-Mustansir recalled general Badr al-Jamali, who was at the time the governor of Acre. Badr led his troops into Egypt, entered Cairo in January 1074, and successfully suppressed the different groups of the rebelling armies. As a result, Badr was made vizier, becoming one of the first military viziers (amir al-juyush 'commander of the armies') who would dominate late Fatimid politics. In 1078 al-Mustansir formally abdicated responsibility for all state affairs to him. His de facto rule initiated a temporary and limited revival of the Fatimid state, although it was now faced with serious challenges. Badr reestablished Fatimid authority in the Hejaz (Mecca and Medina) and the Sulayhids were able to hold on in Yemen. Syria, however, saw the advance of the Sunni-aligned Seljuk Turks, who had conquered much of the Middle East and had become the guardians of the Abbasid Caliphs, as well as independent Turkmen groups. Atsiz ibn Uwaq, a Turkmen of the Nawaki tribe, conquered Jerusalem in 1073 and Damascus in 1076 before attempting to invade even Egypt itself. After defeating him at a battle close to Cairo, Badr was able to start a counter-offensive to secure coastal cities, such as Gaza and Ascalon, and later Tyre, Sidon, and Byblos further north in 1089.

Badr made major reforms to the state, updating and simplifying the administration of Egypt. As he was of Armenian background, his term also saw a large influx of Armenian immigrants, both Christian and Muslim, into Egypt. The Armenian church, patronised by Badr, established itself in the country along with a clerical hierarchy. He commanded a large contingent of Armenian troops, many (if not all) of whom were also Christian. Badr also used his relations and influence with the Coptic Church for political advantage. In particular, he enlisted Cyril II (Coptic Pope from 1078 to 1092) to secure the allegiance of the Christian kingdoms of Nubia (specifically Makuria) and Ethiopia (specifically the Zagwe dynasty) as vassals to the Fatimid state.

The Juyushi Mosque ('the Mosque of the Armies'), was commissioned by Badr and completed in 1085 under the patronage of the caliph. The mosque, identified as a mashhad, was also a victory monument commemorating vizier Badr's restoration of order for al-Mustansir. Between 1087 and 1092, the vizier also replaced the mudbrick walls of Cairo with new stone walls and slightly expanded the city. Three of its monumental gates still survive today: Bab Zuweila, Bab al-Futuh, and Bab al-Nasr.

==== Final decline ====
Siege of Jerusalem (1099), Gallica

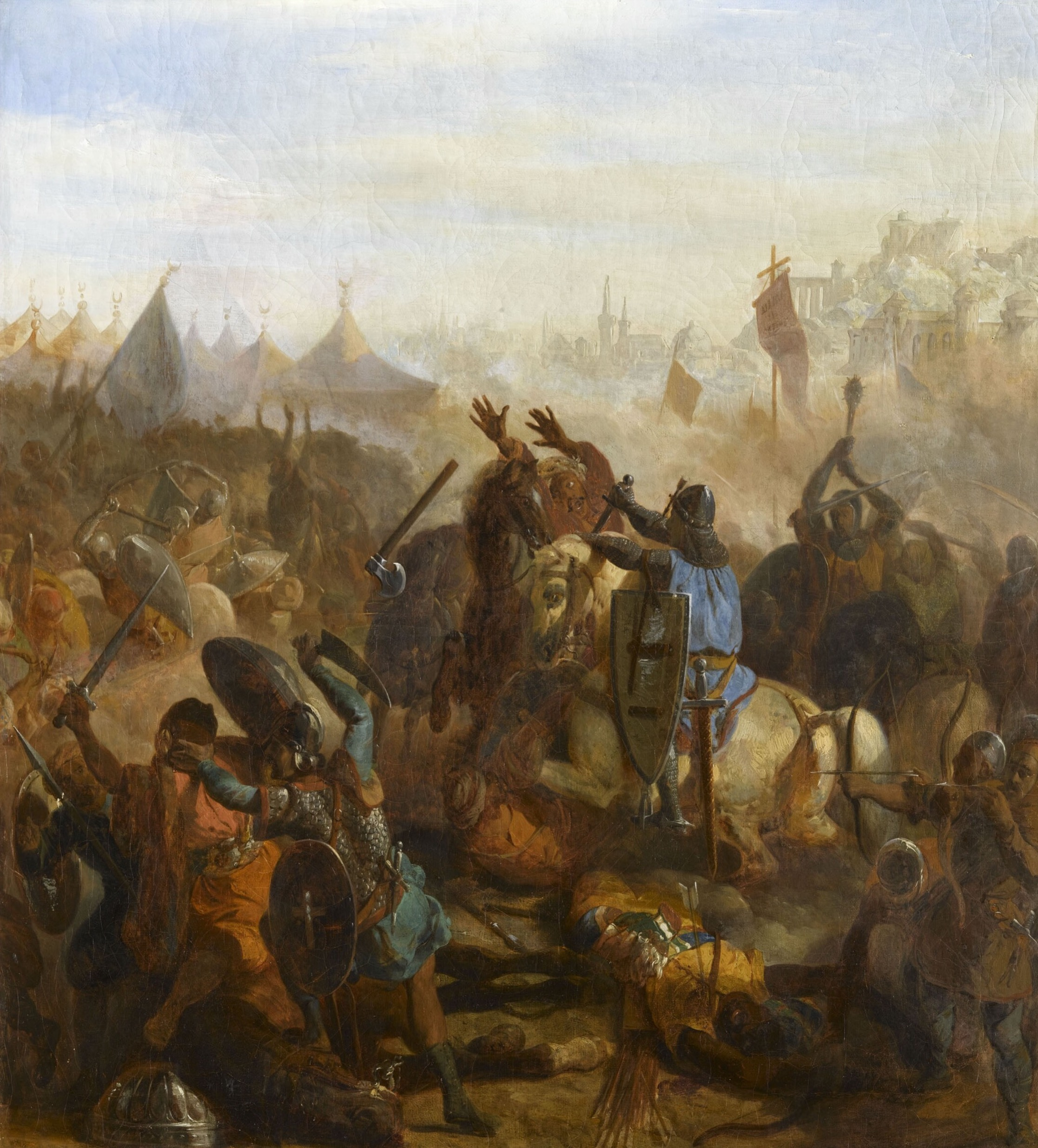
Battle of Ascalon in 1099, pitting Frankish Crusaders against Fatimid troops, by Prosper Lafaye (1841).

As the military viziers effectively became heads of state, the Caliph himself was reduced to the role of a figurehead. The reliance on the iqta system also ate into Fatimid central authority, as more and more the military officers at the further ends of the empire became semi-independent.

Badr al-Jamali died in 1094, along with Caliph al-Mustansir that same year, and his son Al-Afdal Shahanshah succeeded him in power as vizier. After al-Mustansir, the Caliphate passed on to al-Musta'li; after his death in 1101, it passed to the 5-year-old al-Amir. Another of al-Mustansir's sons, Nizar, attempted to take the throne after his father's death and organised a rebellion in 1095, but he was defeated and executed that same year. This resulted in a schism with Isma'ili missionaries in Iran, led by the da'i Hasan-i Sabbah, who founded the Nizari sect and went on to form the Order of Assassins. Al-Afdal arranged for his sister to marry al-Musta'li and later for his daughter to marry al-Amir, hoping in this way to merge his family with that of the caliphs. He also attempted to secure the succession of his son to the vizierate as well, but this ultimately failed.

During al-Afdal's tenure (1094–1121), the Fatimids faced a new external threat: the First Crusade. Although initially both sides intended to reach an agreement and an alliance against the Seljuk Turks, these negotiations would eventually break down. First contact seems to have been established by the crusaders who sent in May or June 1097, on suggestion of Byzantine Emperor Alexios Komnenos, an embassy to al-Afdal. In return the Fatimids dispatched an embassy to the crusading forces which arrived in February 1098 during their siege of Antioch, witnessing and congratulating the crusaders on their victory against the Seljuk emirs Ridwan of Aleppo and Sökmen of Jerusalem as well as stressing their friendly attitude towards Christians. The Fatimid embassy stayed for a month with the crusading forces before returning via the harbour of Latakia with gifts as well as Frankish ambassadors. It is uncertain whether an agreement was reached but it seems that the parties expected to reach a conclusion in Cairo. Al-Afdal took then advantage of the crusader victory at Antioch to reconquer Jerusalem in August 1098, possibly to be in a better position in the negotiations with the crusaders. The next time both parties met was at Arqah in April 1099 where an impasse was reached in regard to the question of ownership over Jerusalem. Following this, the crusaders crossed into Fatimid territory and captured Jerusalem in July 1099 while al-Afdal was leading a relief army trying to reach the city. The two forces finally clashed in the Battle of Ascalon in which al-Afdal was defeated. Nevertheless, the initial negotiations were held against the Fatimids and Ibn al-Athir wrote that it was said that the Fatimids had invited the crusaders to invade Syria.

This defeat established the Kingdom of Jerusalem as a new regional rival and although many crusaders returned to Europe, having fulfilled their vows, the remaining forces, often aided by the Italian maritime republics, overran much of the coastal Levant, with Tripoli, Beirut, and Sidon falling to them between 1109 and 1110. The Fatimids retained Tyre, Ascalon, and Gaza with the help of their fleet. After 1107, a new rising star rose through the ranks of the regime in the form of Muhammad Ali bin Fatik, better known as al-Ma'mun al-Bata'ihi. He managed to carry out various administrative reforms and infrastructural projects in the later years of al-Afdal's term, including the construction of an astronomical observatory in 1119. Al-Afdal was assassinated in 1121, an act blamed on the Nizaris or Assassins, though the truth of this is unconfirmed.

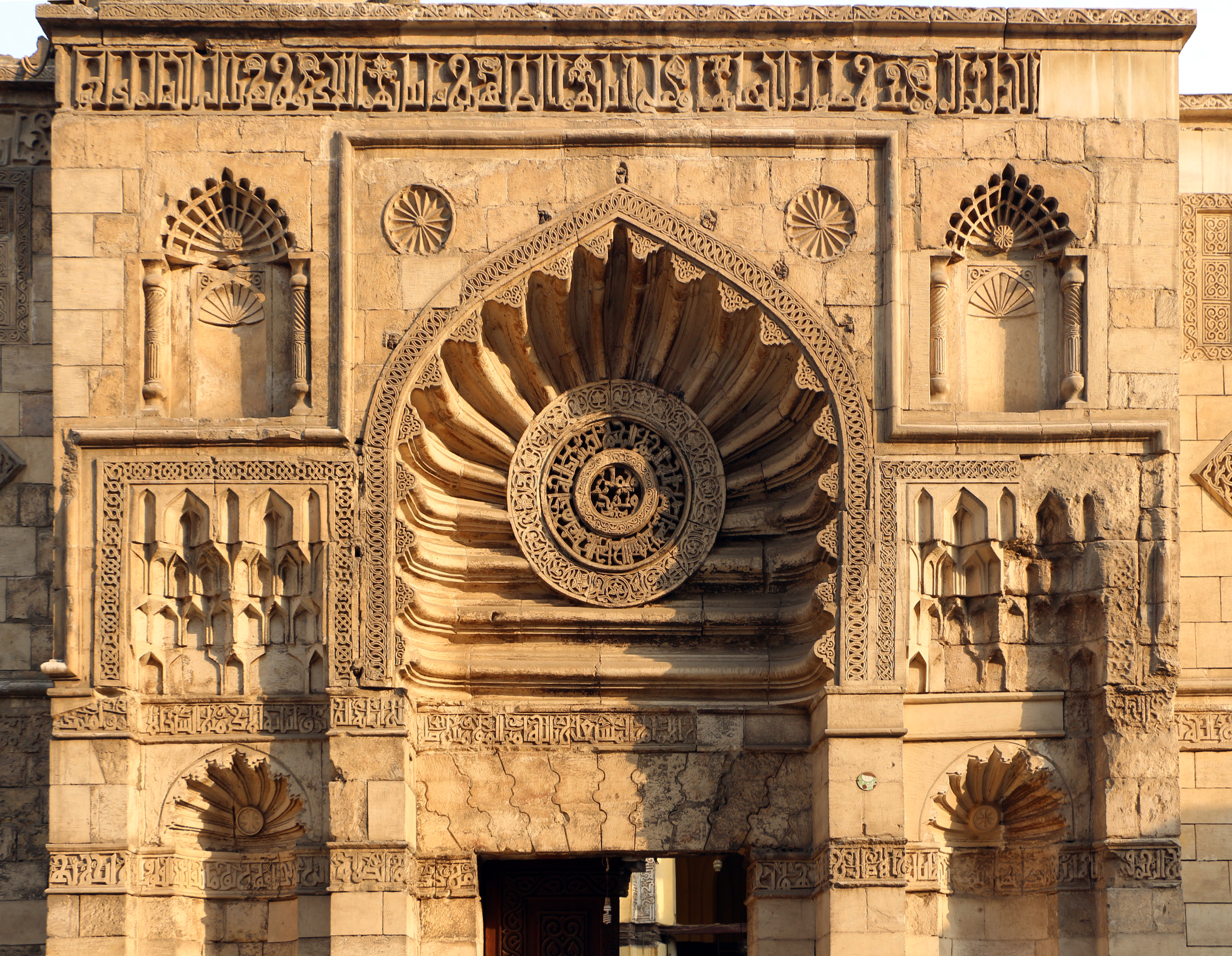
Al-Aqmar Mosque built in 1125-6, under the Caliph al-Amir

Al-Bata'ihi took al-Afdal's place as vizier, but unlike his predecessors he had less support in the army and was ultimately reliant on the caliph for power. In 1124, he lost Tyre to the Crusaders. He was also responsible for constructing a small but notable mosque in Cairo, the Al-Aqmar Mosque, which was completed in 1125 and has largely survived to the present day. That same year, however, Caliph al-Amir had him arrested, probably due to his failure to resist the Crusaders or due to the caliph's resentment of his wealth and power. Three years later he was executed. Al-Amir then ruled the Caliphate personally, briefly interrupting the long period of de facto rule by the caliph's viziers. Al-Amir himself was assassinated in 1130, probably by the Nizari Assassins.

Al-Amir did not leave an adult heir but apparently had a son born shortly before his death, known as al-Ṭayyib. One of Al-Amir's cousins (a grandson of al-Mustansir), Abd al-Majid, had himself appointed regent. Under pressure from the army, one of al-Afdal's sons, Abu Ali Ahmad (known as Kutayfat), was appointed vizier with titles similar to al-Afdal and Badr al-Jamali. Kutayfat attempted to depose the Fatimid dynasty by imprisoning Abd al-Majid and by declaring himself to be the representative of Muhammad al-Muntazar, the "hidden" Imam awaited by Twelver Shi'as. The coup did not last long, as Kutayfat was assassinated in 1131 by al-Amir's followers in the Fatimid establishment. Abd al-Majid was released and resumed his role as regent. In 1132, however, he declared himself to be the new Imam-Caliph, taking the title of al-Hafiz, sidelining the infant al-Ṭayyib and breaking with the tradition of the succession passing directly from father to son. Most of the Fatimid lands acknowledged his succession, but the Sulayhids in Yemen did not and broke away from the Caliphate in Cairo, recognising al-Ṭayyib as the true Imam. This caused another schism between the Hafizi and Tayyibi branches of the Musta'li Isma'ilis.

In 1135, al-Hafiz was pressured by the Fatimid Armenian troops into appointing Bahram, a Christian Armenian, to the office of vizier. Opposition from Muslim troops forced him to leave in 1137, when Ridwan, a Sunni Muslim, was appointed vizier. When Ridwan began to plot the deposition of al-Hafiz, he was expelled from Cairo and later defeated in battle. He accepted a pardon from the caliph and remained at the palace. Al-Hafiz chose not to appoint another vizier, and instead took direct control of the state until his death in 1149. During this time, the fervour of the Isma'ili religious cause in Egypt had significantly faded, and political challenges to the caliph became more common. Sunni Muslims were also increasingly appointed to high posts. The Fatimid dynasty largely continued to survive due to the established common interests that many factions and elites had in maintaining the current system of government.

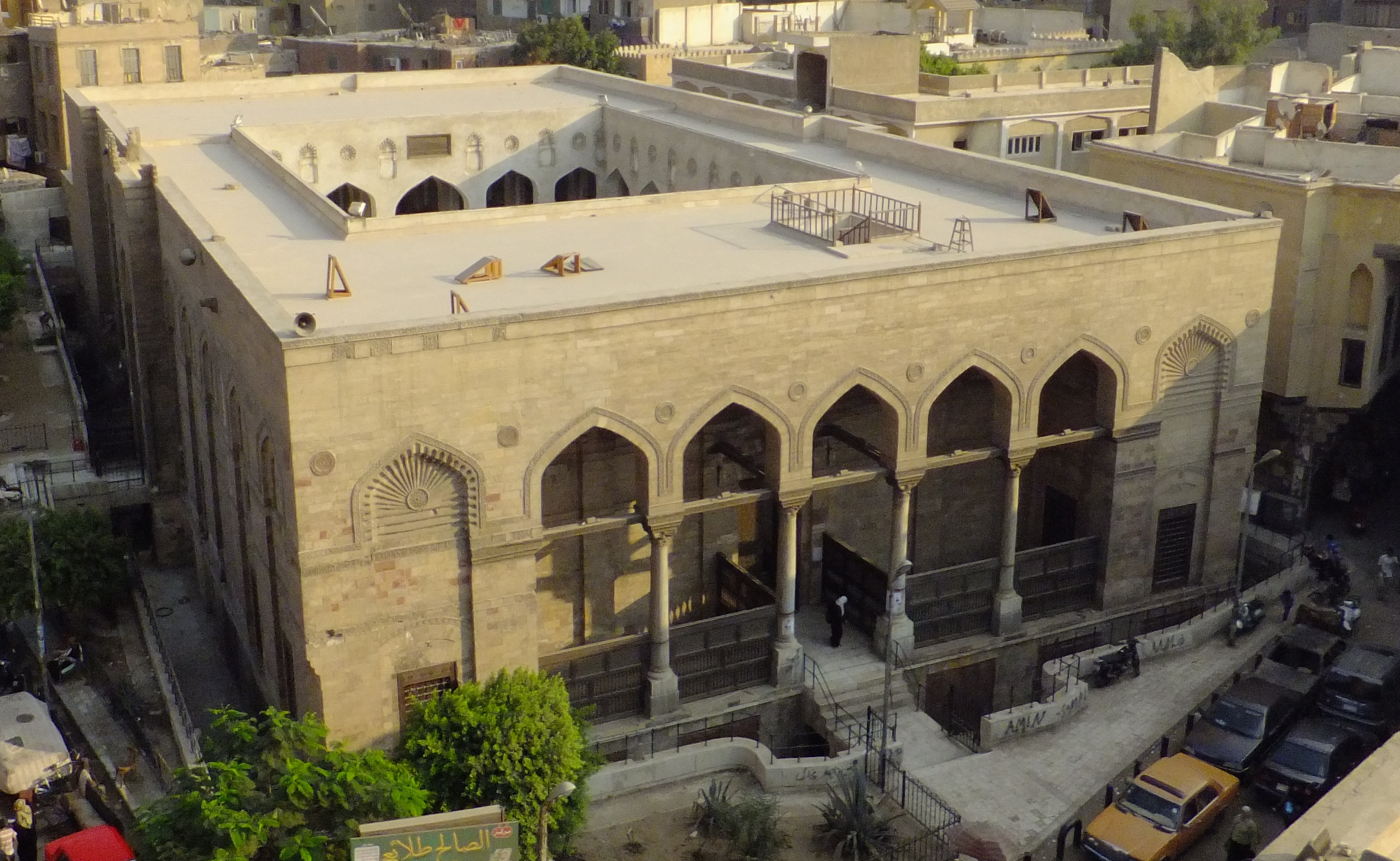
Al-Salih Tala'i Mosque in Cairo, built by Tala'i ibn Ruzzik in 1160 and originally intended to house the head of Husayn (the head ended up being interred instead at the present-day al-Hussein Mosque)

Al-Hafiz was the last Fatimid caliph to rule directly and the last one to ascend to the throne as an adult. The last three caliphs, al-Zafir (r. 1149–1154), al-Fa'iz (r. 1154–1160), and al-Adid (r. 1160–1171), were all children when they came to the throne. Under al-Zafir, an elderly Berber named Ibn Masal was initially vizier, per the instructions left by Al-Hafiz. The army, however, supported a Sunni named Ibn Sallar instead, whose supporters managed to defeat and kill Ibn Masal in battle. After negotiating with the women of the palace, Ibn Sallar was installed as vizier in 1150. In January 1153, the Crusader king Baldwin III of Jerusalem besieged Ascalon, the last remaining Fatimid foothold in the Levant. In April, Ibn Sallar was murdered in a plot organised by Abbas, his stepson, and Abbas's son, Nasr. As no relieving force arrived, Ascalon surrendered in August, on the condition that the inhabitants could leave safely for Egypt. It was on this occasion that the head of Husayn was allegedly brought from Ascalon to Cairo, where it was housed in what is now the al-Hussein Mosque. The next year (1154), Nasr murdered al-Zafir, and Abbas, now vizier, declared his 5-year-old son Isa (al-Fa'iz) the new caliph. The women of the palace intervened, calling on Tala'i ibn Ruzzik, a Muslim Armenian governor in Upper Egypt, to help. Tala'i drove out Abbas and Nasr from Cairo and became vizier that same year. Afterwards he also conducted renewed operations against the Crusaders, but he could do little more than harass them by sea. Al-Fa'iz died in 1160 and Tala'i was assassinated in 1161 by Sitt al-Qusur, a sister of al-Zafir. Tala'i's son, Ruzzik ibn Tala'i, held the office of vizier until 1163, when he was overthrown and killed by Shawar, the governor of Qus.

As vizier, Shawar came into conflict with his rival, the Arab general Dirgham. The internal disorder of the Caliphate attracted the attention and meddling of the Sunni Zengid ruler Nur ad-Din, who was now in control of Damascus and a large part of Syria, and of the King of Jerusalem, Amalric I. The Crusaders had already forced Tala'i ibn Ruzzik to pay them a tribute in 1161 and had made an attempt to invade Egypt in 1162. When Shawar was driven out of Cairo by Dirgham in 1163, he sought refuge and help with Nur al-Din. Nur al-Din sent his general, Asad al-Din Shirkuh, to seize Egypt and reinstall Shawar as vizier. He accomplished this task in the summer of 1164, when Dirgham was defeated and killed.

Shawar's remaining years continued in chaos as he made shifting alliances with either the King of Jerusalem or with Nur al-Din, depending on circumstances. In 1167, the Crusaders pursued Shirkuh's forces into Upper Egypt. In 1168, Shawar, worried about the possible Crusader capture of Cairo, infamously set fire to Fustat in an attempt to deny the Crusaders a base from which to besiege the capital. After forcing the Crusaders to leave Egypt again, Shirkuh finally had Shawar murdered in 1169, with the agreement of Caliph al-Adid. Shirkuh himself was appointed as al-Adid's vizier, but he died unexpectedly two months later. The position passed to his nephew, Salah ad-Din Yusuf ibn Ayyub (known in the West as Saladin). Salah ad-Din was openly pro-Sunni and suppressed the Shi'a call to prayer, ended the Isma'ili doctrinal lectures (the majalis al-hikma), and installed Sunni judges. He finally and officially deposed al-Adid, the last Fatimid caliph, in September 1171. This ended the Fatimid dynasty and began the Ayyubid Sultanate of Egypt and Syria.

== Society ==
=== Religious communities ===
Fatimid society was highly pluralistic. Isma'ili Shi'ism was the religion of the state and the caliph's court, but most of the population followed different religions or denominations. Most of the Muslim population remained Sunni, and a large part of the population remained Christian. Jews were a smaller minority. As in other Islamic societies of the time, non-Muslims were classified as dhimmis, a term which implied both certain restrictions and certain liberties, though the practical circumstances of this status varied from context to context. As elsewhere in the historic Muslim world, they were required to pay the jizya tax. Scholars generally agree that, on the whole, Fatimid rule was highly tolerant and inclusive towards different religious communities.

Unlike western European governments of the era, advancement in Fatimid state offices was more meritocratic than hereditary. Members of other branches of Islam, like the Sunnis, were just as likely to be appointed to government posts as Shiites. Tolerance was extended to non-Muslims, such as Christians and Jews, who occupied high levels in government based on ability, and this policy of tolerance ensured the flow of money from non-Muslims in order to finance the Caliphs' large army of Mamluks brought in from Circassia by Genoese merchants.

There were exceptions to this general attitude of tolerance, however, most notably by al-Hakim, though this has been highly debated, with Al-Hakim's reputation among medieval Muslim historians conflated with his role in the Druze faith. Christians in general and Copts in particular were persecuted by Al-Hakim; the persecution of the Christians included closing and demolishing churches and forced conversion to Islam. With the succession of Caliph al-Zahir, the Druze faced a mass persecution, which included large massacres against the Druze in Antioch, Aleppo, and other cities.

==== Isma'ilis ====
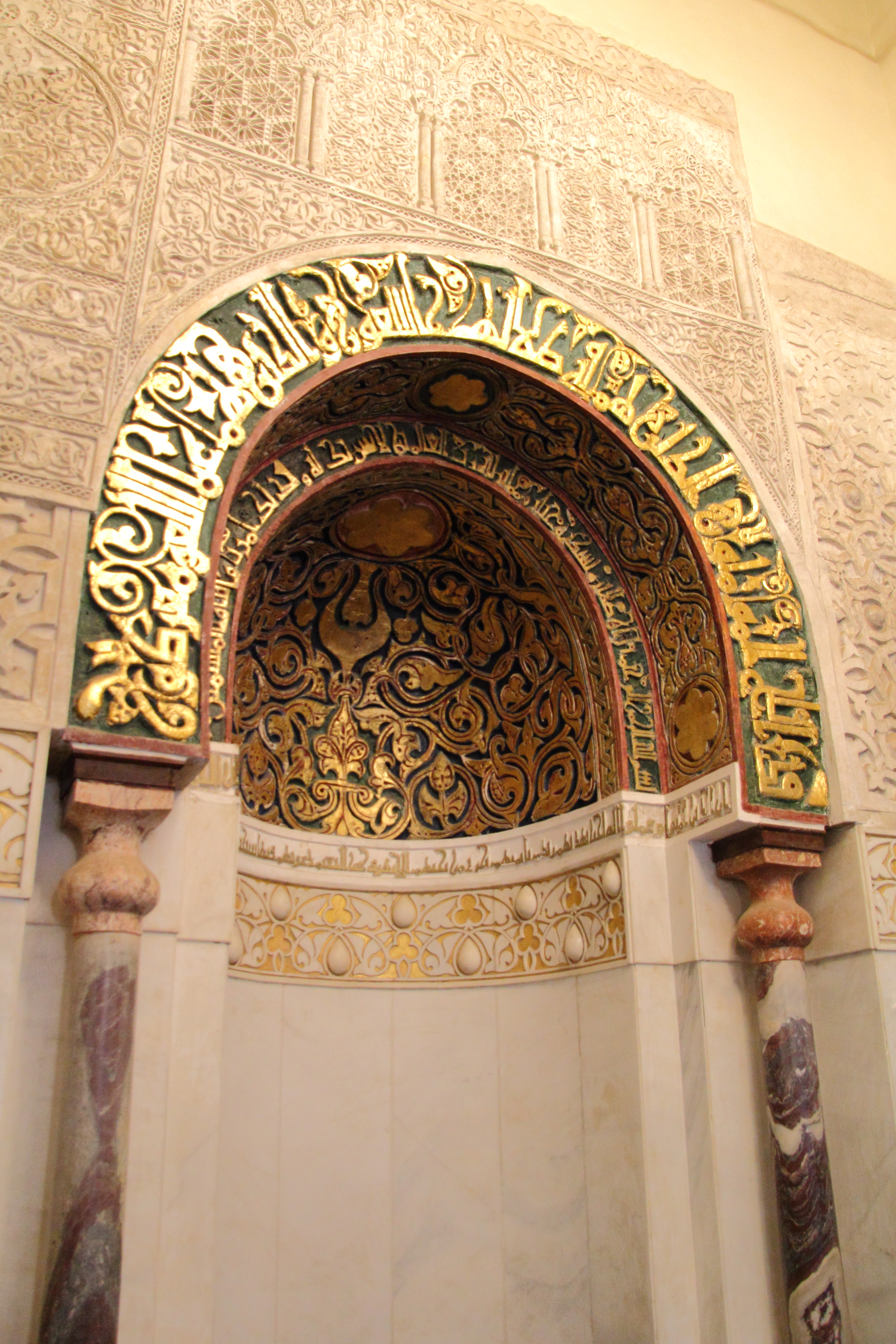
The original Fatimid-period mihrab inside the al-Azhar Mosque

It's unclear what number or percentage of the population inside the caliphate were actually Isma'ilis, but they always remained a minority. Historical chronicles report large numbers of enthusiastic converts in Egypt during the reign of al-'Aziz, but this trend dropped significantly around the middle of al-Hakim's reign. The Fatimid state promoted Isma'ili doctrine (the da'wa) through a hierarchical organisation. The Imam-Caliph, as successor to Muhammad, was both the political and religious leader. Below the Imam-Caliph, the top of this hierarchy was headed by the da'i l-du'at or "supreme missionary". Newcomers to the doctrine were initiated by attending the majalis al-hikma ("Sessions of Wisdom"), lectures and lessons that were delivered in a special hall inside the palaces of Cairo. The doctrine was kept secret from those who were not initiated. Additionally, Isma'ili doctrines were disseminated through the lectures hosted at Al-Azhar Mosque in Cairo, which became an intellectual centre hosting teachers and students. Beyond the borders of the Fatimid Caliphate, recruitment to the da'wa continued to be performed in secret as it had been before the caliphate's establishment, though the many missionaries maintained contact with the leadership in Ifriqiya or Egypt. Some of the da'is (missionaries) abroad sometimes came to Cairo and became important figures in the state, as with the example of al-Kirmani during al-Hakim's reign.

Isma'ili unity was weakened over time by several schisms after the establishment of the caliphate (in addition to the Qarmatian schism before its establishment). The Druze, who believed in the divinity of Caliph al-Hakim, were suppressed in Egypt and elsewhere, but eventually found a home in the region of Mount Lebanon. After the death of Caliph al-Mustansir, a succession crisis resulted in the breakaway of the Nizaris, who supported the claim of his oldest son Nizar, as opposed to the Musta'lis who supported the successful enthronement of al-Musta'li. The Nizaris were also suppressed inside the Caliphate's borders, but continued to be active outside it, mostly in Iran, Iraq, and parts of Syria. After the death of Caliph al-Amir, al-Hafiz, his cousin, successfully claimed the title of Imam-Caliph at the expense of al-Amir's infant son, al-Tayyib. Those who recognised al-Hafiz in Cairo were known as the al-Hafizi branch, but those who opposed this unusual succession and supported the succession of al-Tayyib were known as the al-Tayyibi branch. This particular schism resulted in the loss of Fatimid support in Yemen.

==== Other Muslims ====
In Ifriqiya, the Sunni Muslims of the cities largely followed the Maliki school or madhhab. The Maliki school had become predominant here during the eighth century at the expense of the Hanafi school, which had generally been favoured by the Aghlabids. In Egypt, the majority of Muslims were Sunni and remained so throughout the Fatimid period. Cognisant of this, the Fatimid authorities introduced Shi'a changes to religious rituals only gradually after Jawhar's conquest. It was also in this era that the followers of the Hanafi, Shafi'i, Hanbali, and Maliki schools were beginning to think of themselves collectively, to one extent or another, as Sunni, which undermined the universalism that the Shi'a Isma'ilis promoted. Some Shi'as, including some Hasanid and Husaynid families, were also present in Egypt and welcomed the Fatimids as fellow Shi'as or as blood relatives, but without necessarily converting to Isma'ilism. Many non-Isma'ili Muslims also accepted the Fatimid caliphs as having legitimate rights to lead the Muslim community but did not accept the more absolute Shi'a beliefs in the concept of the Imamate.

==== Christians ====
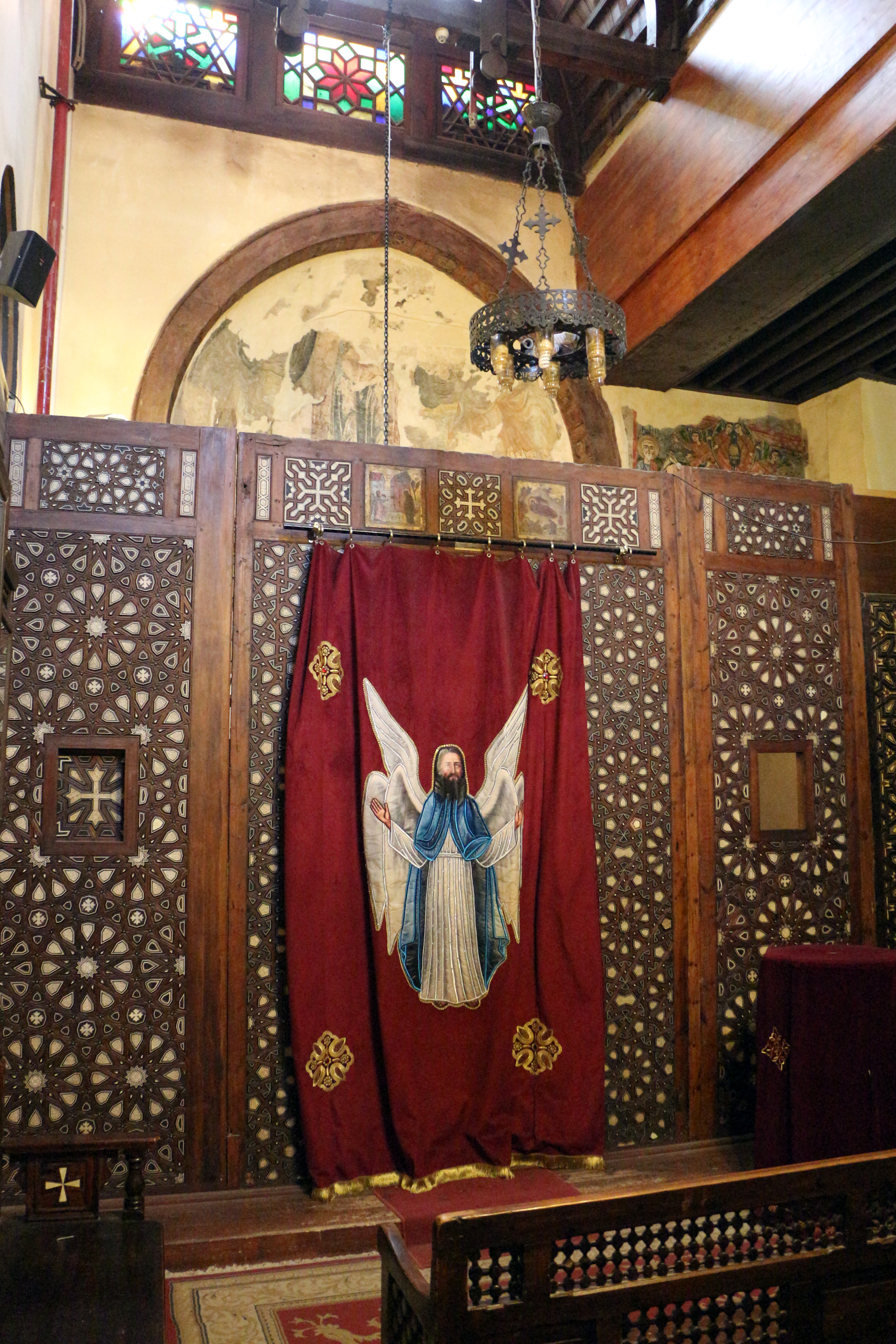
Side chapel in the Hanging Church in Old Cairo, including frescoes (partly visible behind the screen here) dating from the late 12th or 13th century, before the church's later renovation

Christians may have still constituted a majority of the population in Egypt during the Fatimid period, although scholarly estimates on this issue are tentative and vary between authors. The proportion of Christians would have likely been greater in the rural population than in the main cities. Among Christians, the largest community were Copts, followed by Melkite Christians. A large number of Armenian immigrants also arrived in Egypt during the late 11th and early 12th centuries when Armenian viziers like Badr al-Jamali dominated the state, which led to the Armenian church establishing a foothold in the country as well. In addition to churches in towns and cities, Christian monasteries also dotted the countryside. Some regions, like Wadi al-Natrun, were ancient centres of Coptic monasticism. Italian traders, led by Amalfitans, were also present in Fustat and Alexandria, moving goods between Egypt and the rest of the Mediterranean world.

Within the Christian communities, and especially among Copts, there emerged a relatively affluent class of notables who served as scribes or administrators in the Fatimid regime. These laymen used their wealth to patronise, and in turn influence, their churches. The state also had influence on the church, as demonstrated by the transfer of the Coptic Patriarchate from Alexandria to Fustat (specifically what is now Old Cairo) during the patriarchate of Cyril II (1078–1092), due to the demands of Badr al-Jamali, who wished for the Coptic pope to stay close to the capital. The Church of the Virgin, now known as the Hanging Church, became the new seat of the Patriarchate, along with an alternative church compound built on the upper floor of the St. Mercurius Church. Until the 14th century (when the seat was moved to the Church of the Virgin Mary in Harat Zuwayla), both churches were residences of the Coptic pope and served as venues for the consecrations of new popes and other important religious events.

==== Jews ====
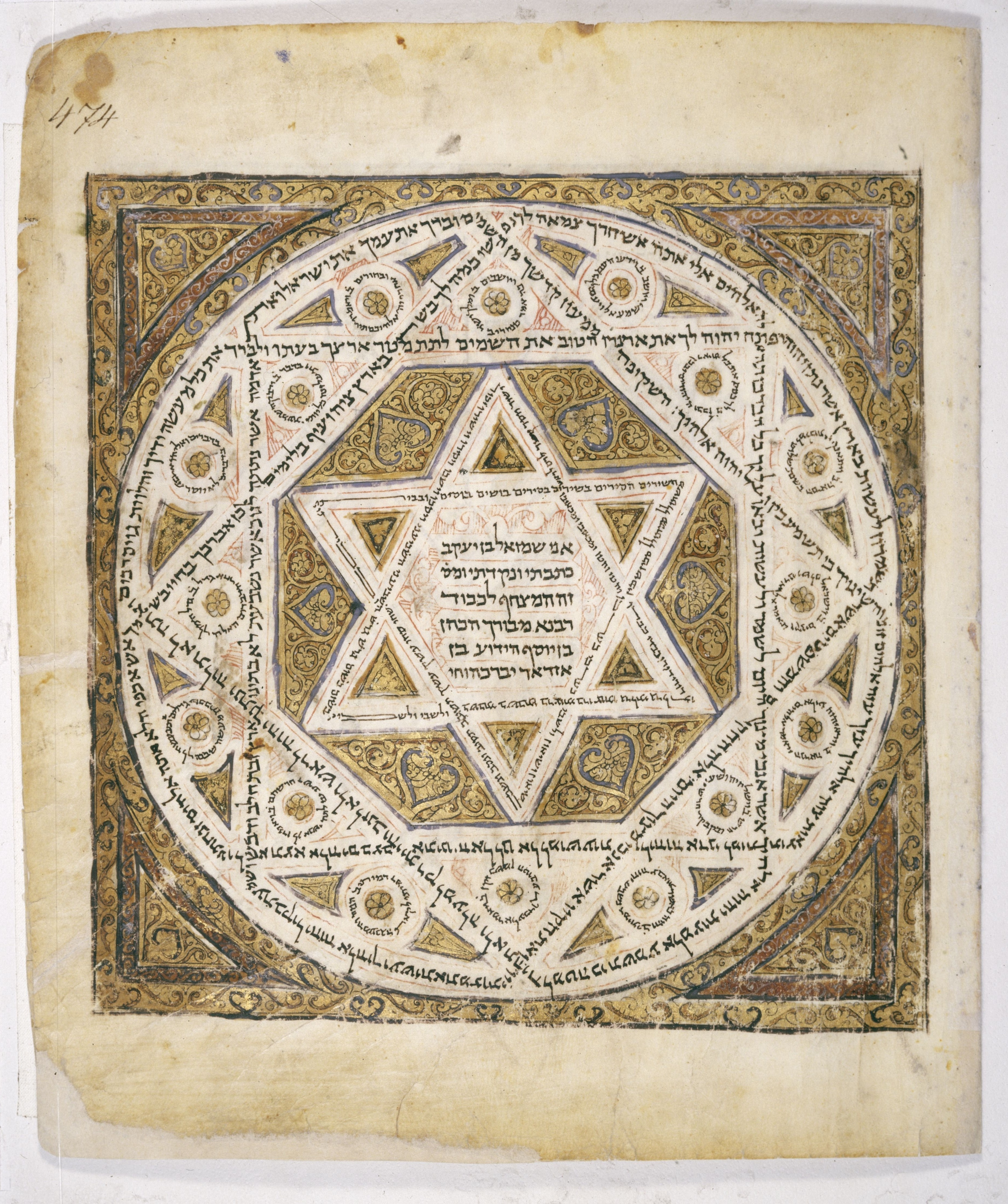
Cover page of the Leningrad Codex, a manuscript of the Hebrew Bible copied in Cairo/Fustat in the early 11th century

Jewish communities existed across the territories under Fatimid control and also enjoyed a degree of self-governance. Although a smaller minority compared to Christians and Muslims, their history is relatively well documented thanks to the Genizah documents. The community was divided between Rabbanites and Karaites. Traditionally, up until the late 11th century, the most powerful head of the Jewish community was the ga'on or leader of the yeshiva of Jerusalem, who appointed judges and other Jewish community officials across the region. The Fatimids formally charged the ga'on of Jerusalem with responsibilities as representative of the community. By 1100, however, a new position had been established by Jews in Fustat, known to them as Nagid in Hebrew, and later officially recognized by the Muslim authorities as Rais al-Yahud (meaning "Head of the Jews") in Arabic. This shift was likely due to the Jerusalem ga'on's own loss of influence, hastened by the Fatimid time of troubles and by the Seljuk invasion of Palestine, and to the Jewish community's engagement with the centralizing politics that Badr al-Jamali pursued around this time (which had already resulted in the transfer of the Coptic Patriarchate to Fustat). While the Nagid was always from the Rabbinite community, he also represented Karaite Jews and Samaritans.

=== Language ===
Religious diversity notwithstanding, the spread of Arabic as the main language of the population had already progressed rapidly before the Fatimid period. In parts of Egypt, Copts and possibly also some Muslim communities were still speaking Coptic when the Fatimids arrived on the scene. It is during the Fatimid period, however, that Coptic religious culture began to be translated into Arabic. By the end of the Fatimid period (12th century), many Coptic Christians could no longer understand the Coptic language, and eventually its usage was reduced to a liturgical language.

In the Maghreb, Berber languages had remained dominant among the rural and nomadic populations of the countryside since the early Arab conquests, while Arabic was dominant primarily in and around urban centres such as Kairouan. In the 11th century, the Fatimid caliphs in Egypt incited the Arab Bedouin tribes of the Banu Hilal and Banu Sulaym to migrate westwards from Egypt towards Ifriqiya in retaliation for the Zirids' declaration of independence. This mass migration initiated a new wave of Arabization throughout most of the Maghrebi countryside and precipitated the decline of Berber languages there over time, except in some mountainous or desert areas.

=== Dynasty ===
White was the dynastic color of the Fatimids, in opposition to Abbasid black, while red and yellow banners were associated with the caliph's person. Green is also cited as their dynastic color, based on a tradition that Muhammad wore a green cloak. The dynasty was Arab in origin, starting with their founder Abdullah al-Mahdi billah.

== Military system ==
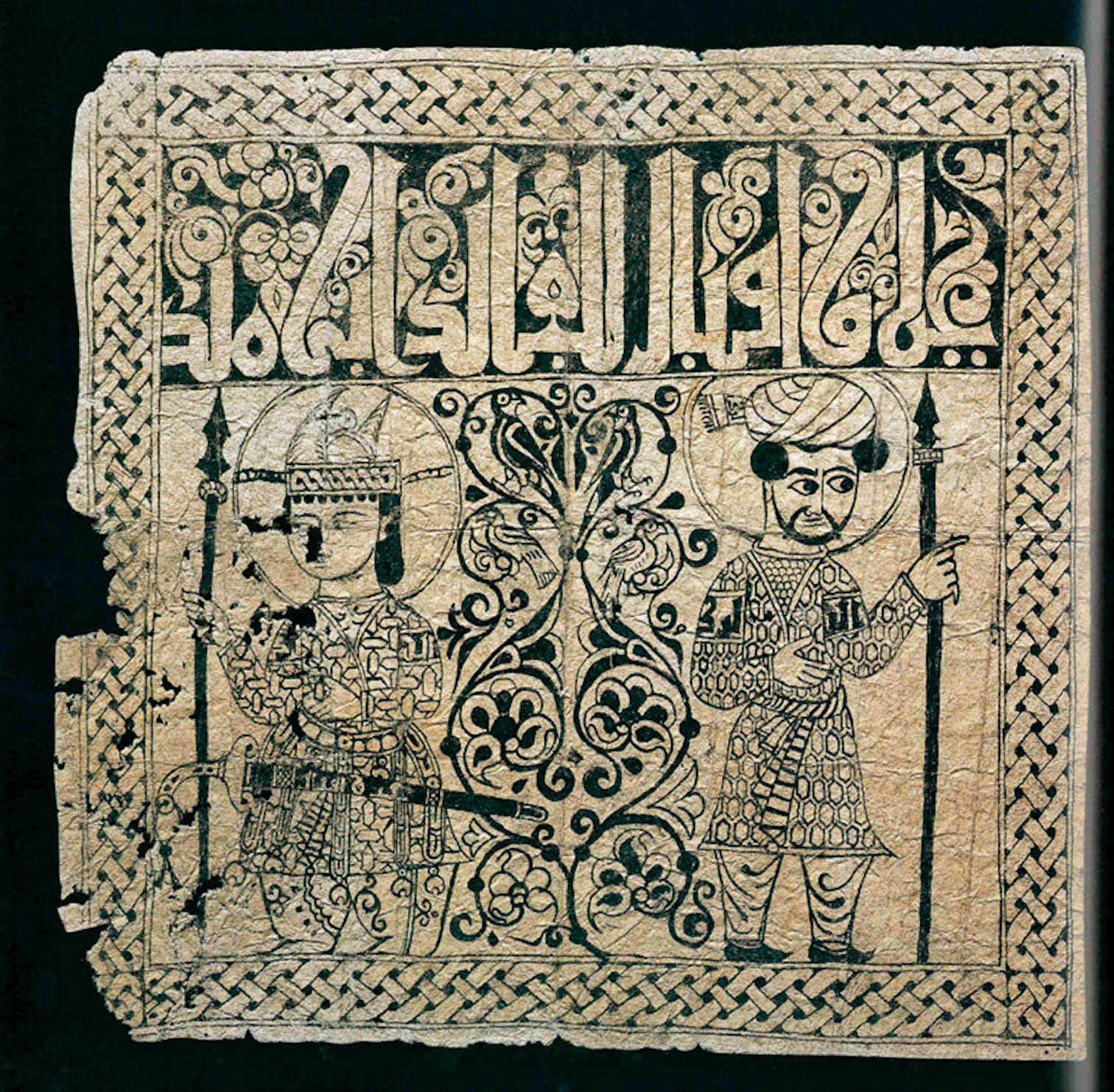
Image of two standing soldiers (A Turk on the left and a Berber on the right). 11th century, Fatimid period, from Fustat near Cairo. Museum of Islamic Art, Cairo, inv. no. 13703. Attribution to the Fatimid period is sometimes questioned.

=== North Africans ===
The Fatimid military was based largely on the Kutama Berber tribesmen brought along on the march to Egypt, and they remained an important part of the military even after Ifriqiya began to break away. The Kutamas formed the original core of the Fatimid army and were instrumental in the dynasty’s rise. As the first group to pledge mass support to the hidden Ismaili imam, they enabled the public emergence of al-Mahdi. In Ifriqiya the army remained predominantly Berber, though Arab elements gradually increased. After the move to Egypt the Kutamas retained elite status and led major campaigns of expansion and defence, including operations against the Qarmatians. The need for greater numbers and more varied skills prompted ethnic diversification of the army through absorption of defeated forces, defections, slave purchases and the attraction of better patronage. Setbacks in Syria and Palestine hastened a shift in military policy. From the reign of al-ʿAzīz onward the Kutamas had to defend their privileged position against these new rivals and ultimately lost. By the twelfth century they had ceased to exist as a distinct military corps and were absorbed into the civilian population.

Other North African units included the Barqiyya and Batiliyya, who arrived with Jawhar’s army and served as cavalry in military parades. The qasriyya (or qaysariyya) are best known for their role in Sitt al-Mulk’s attempted coup against al-Ḥākim. Around 1020 they joined other corps in rioting, looting and burning markets in the capital. During the economic crisis of 1024–5 their commander initially restrained a gang of Black slave soldiers (jawwala) from looting, but the two groups later collaborated to rob a North African caravan. The qaysariyya also attacked and robbed Turkish troops, provoking Turkish retaliation, and the Kutamas submitted petitions against them to al-Ẓāhir.

=== Turks ===
A fundamental change occurred when the Fatimid Caliphate attempted to push into Syria in the latter half of the tenth century. The Fatimids were faced with the now Turkish-dominated forces of the Abbasid Caliphate and began to realise the limits of their current military. After al-Azīz defeated Alptakin and his coalition in Syria and Palestine, several thousand Turkish soldiers were incorporated into the Fatimid forces and brought to Cairo. Thus during the reign of al-Aziz Billah and al-Hakim bi-Amr Allah, the Caliph began including armies of Turks. These Turks, who were freedmen under their own commander, received preferential treatment that diminished the standing of the Kutama; strong ties of patronage bound them closely to the dynasty, and they settled in a distinct quarter of Fustat. Alongside them, other significant contingents included the Daylamīs from the Caspian region and the Kurds. The Daylamīs, of Persian origin, likewise entered Fatimid service following the same victory over Alptakin and were easily identified in military processions by the javelins they carried.

=== Black troops ===
As a military leader, Barjawān played a central role in forming the government that took power after Sitt al-Mulk’s death. His influence—and that of his associates—grew substantially because al-Ḥākim had greatly expanded the recruitment of Black infantry. Positioned between the Maghāriba (Berbers) on one side and the Mashāriqa (Turks and Daylamīs) on the other, These Black troops, purchased as slaves from Nubia and through the trans-Saharan trade via Zawīla in the Fezzan, became a major component of the army. They gave the palace a reliable force that could counterbalance the long-standing ethnic rivalries within the military.

=== Armenians ===
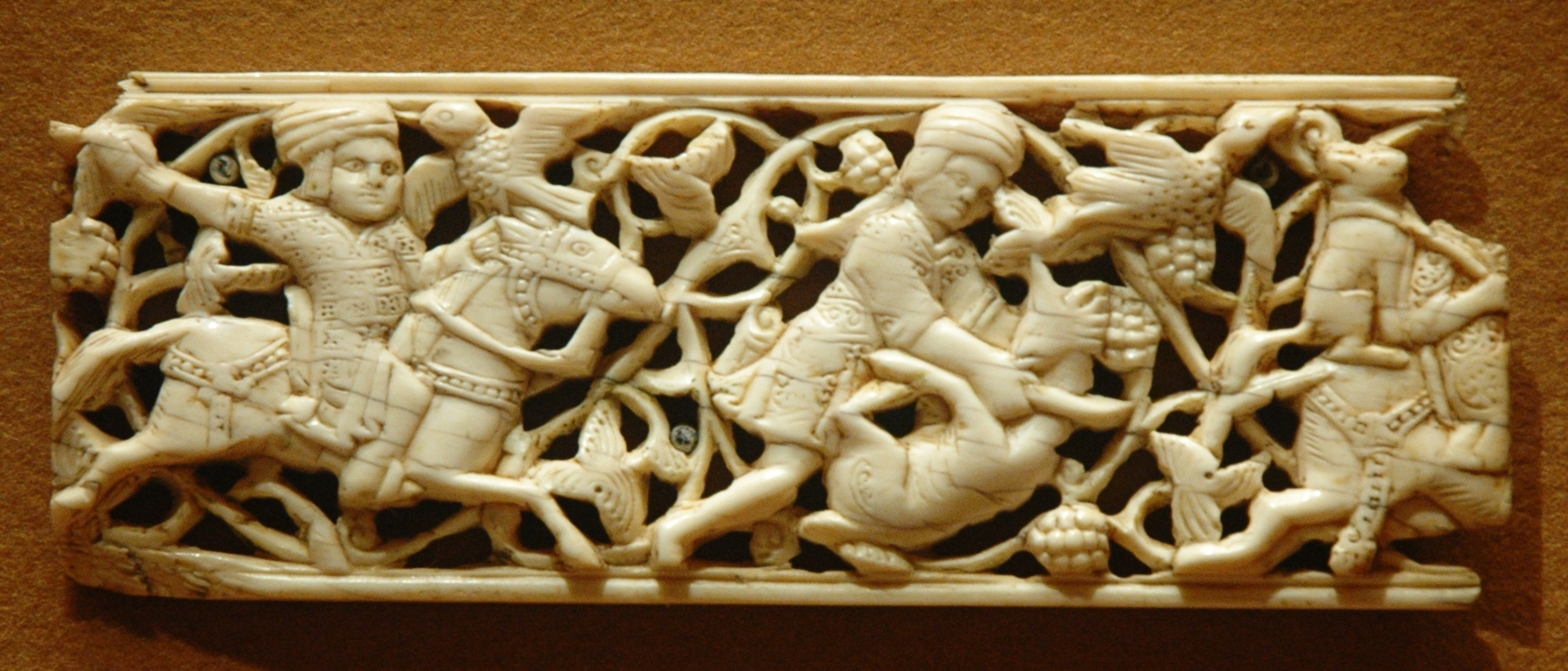
Men hunting, on ivory panel, 11th century

By the late eleventh century the Armenians had become the dominant ethnic group in the Fatimid infantry. This shift followed the arrival in Cairo of the Armenian commander Badr al-Jamālī from Acre (ʿAkka), summoned by the caliph al-Mustanṣir to restore order during a severe crisis. Badr al-Jamālī belonged to a broader Armenian migration into Syria that had begun in the tenth century. Armenians settled along the new Byzantine-Syrian frontier and served in the Byzantine army as both cavalry and infantry. By the reign of al-Ḥākim, Armenians were already present in Fatimid forces fighting Abū Rakwa. Badr himself began his career as a ghulām (military slave) in the service of the Banū ʿAmmār at Tripoli.

Badr’s appointment as governor of Damascus in place of Nāṣir al-Dawla proved decisive, though he was an unwelcome outsider there and at odds with Nāṣir. Returning to Acre, he secured the coast from Acre to Ascalon, recruited an army of fellow Armenians (infantry and cavalry archers), and took command of the Fatimid fleet. Elevated by al-Mustanṣir as the dynasty’s champion, Badr remained dependent on his (partly Christian) Armenian troops and the Armenians who accompanied him into Egypt. In 1087 he welcomed an Armenian patriarch for the community; this was also welcomed by Coptic circles because of the shared Monophysite faith of Armenians, Copts, Nubians and Ethiopians. From the outset Badr treated the Coptic Church as a useful instrument of policy. In the eleventh century the Armenian diaspora expanded further due to the break-up of the Armenian kingdom, its annexation by Byzantium (1020–1050), and Turcoman invasions of the Caucasus and Anatolia. For the Fatimids, this influx of an external people ranked in importance with the Banū Hilāl and the Turcomans. Armenian predominance in the infantry continued until the end of the Fatimid dynasty.

A specialised palace security division performed nightly rounds, announced each evening for an hour at the call to prayer by trumpets, drums and cymbals. This practice dated from the early Fatimid period in Egypt and was modified only by al-Ḥākim, who banned the use of musical instruments.

== Capital cities ==
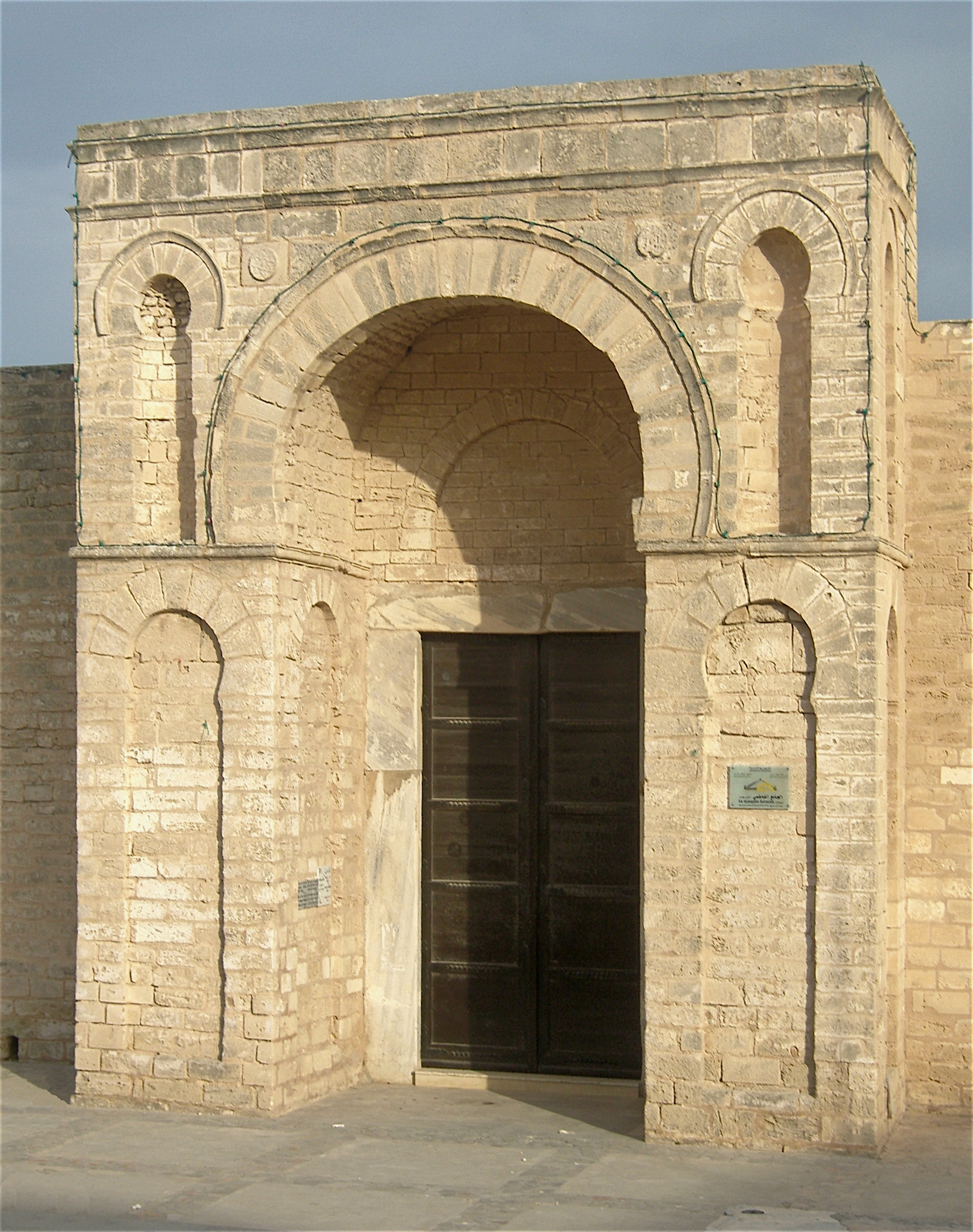
Entrance portal of the Great Mosque of Mahdia (10th century)

=== Al-Mahdiyya ===
Al-Mahdiyya, the first capital of the Fatimid dynasty, was established by its first caliph, Abdullah al-Mahdi (297–322 AH/909–934 CE) in 300 AH/912–913 CE. The caliph had been residing in nearby Raqqada but chose this new and more strategic location in which to establish his dynasty. The city of al-Mahdiyya is located on a narrow peninsula along the coast of the Mediterranean Sea, east of Kairouan and just south of the Gulf of Hammamet, in modern-day Tunisia. The primary concern in the city's construction and locale was defence. With its peninsular topography and the construction of a wall 8.3 m thick, the city became impenetrable by land. This strategic location, together with a navy that the Fatimids had inherited from the conquered Aghlabids, made the city of al-Mahdiyya a strong military base where Abdullah al-Mahdi consolidated power and planted the seeds of the Fatimid caliphate for two generations. The city included two royal palaces—one for the caliph and one for his son and successor al-Qa'im—as well as a mosque, many administrative buildings, and an arsenal.

=== Al-Mansuriyya ===
Al-Mansuriyya (also known as Ṣabra al-Mansuriyya) was established between 334 and 336 AH (945 and 948 CE) by the third Fatimid caliph al-Mansur (334–41 AH/946–53 CE) in a settlement known as Ṣabra, located on the outskirts of Kairouan in modern-day Tunisia. The new capital was established in commemoration of the victory of al-Mansur over the Kharijite rebel Aba Yazid at Ṣabra. Construction of the city was not quite finished when al-Mansur died in 953, but his son and successor, al-Mu'izz, finished it and completed the city's mosque that same year. Like Baghdad, the plan of the city of Al-Mansuriyya is round, with the caliphal palace at its centre. Due to a plentiful water source, the city grew and expanded a great deal under al-Mansur. Archaeological evidence suggests that there were more than 300 hammams built during this period in the city as well as numerous palaces. When al-Mansur's successor, al-Mu'izz, moved the caliphate to Cairo he left his deputy, Buluggin ibn Ziri, as regent of Ifriqiya, marking the beginning of the city's Zirid period. In 1014–15 the Zirid ruler Badis ibn al-Mansur ordered merchants and artisans of Kairouan to be transferred to al-Mansuriyya, which may have helped provoke a revolt in 1016 which damaged the city. In 1057, under pressure from the Banu Hilal invasions, the Zirids abandoned al-Mansuriyya for Mahdiyya and the city was devastated. Unlike Kairouan, it remained in ruins afterwards and was never revived. The site was pillaged over time. Modern archaeological excavations here began in 1921.

=== Cairo ===
Cairo was established by the fourth Fatimid caliph, al-Mu'izz, in 359 AH/970 CE and remained the capital of the Fatimid caliphate for the duration of the dynasty. The city was officially named al-Qahirah al-Mu'izziyya, which can be translated as the "Victorious City of al-Mu'izz", known afterward simply as al-Qahira and giving us the modern English name "Cairo". Cairo can thus be considered the capital of Fatimid cultural production. Though the original Fatimid palace complex, including administrative buildings and royal residences, no longer exists, modern scholars can glean a good idea of the original structure based on the Mamluk-era account of al-Maqrizi. Perhaps the most important of Fatimid monuments outside the palace complex is the mosque of al-Azhar (359–61 AH/970–72 CE) which still stands today, though the building was significantly expanded and modified in later periods. Likewise, the important Fatimid mosque of al-Hakim, built from 380 to 403 AH/990–1012 CE under two Fatimid caliphs, was significantly rebuilt and renovated in the 1980s. Cairo remained the capital for, including al-Mu'izz, eleven generations of caliphs, after which the Fatimid Caliphate finally fell to Ayyubid forces in 567 AH/1171 CE.

== Art and architecture ==
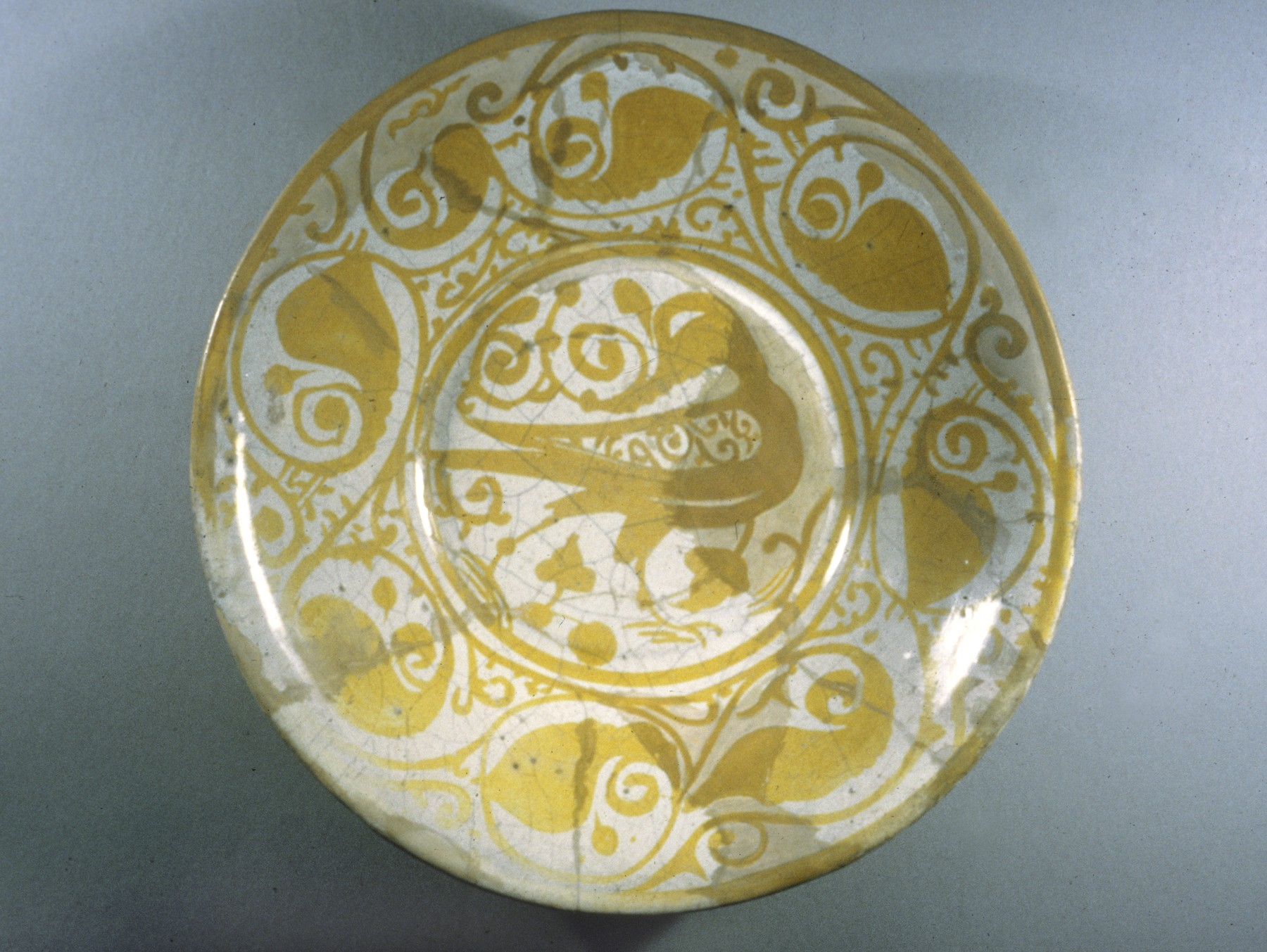
Lustreware Plate with Bird Motif, 11th century. Archaeological digs have found many kilns and ceramic fragments in al-Fustat, and it was likely an important production location for Islamic ceramics during the Fatimid period.

The Fatimids were known for their exquisite arts. The Fatimid period is important in the history of Islamic art and architecture as it is one of the earliest Islamic dynasties for which enough materials survive for a detailed study of their evolution. The stylistic diversity of Fatimid art was also a reflection of the wider cultural environment of the Mediterranean world at this time. The most notable characteristics of their decorative arts are the use of lively figurative motifs and the use of an angular, floriated Kufic script for Arabic inscriptions. Among the best-known art forms that flourished are a type of ceramic lustreware and the crafting of objects carved in solid rock crystal. The dynasty also sponsored the production of linen textiles and a tiraz workshop. A vast collection of different luxury objects once existed within the caliph's palaces, but few examples of them have survived to the present day.

Many traces of Fatimid architecture exist in both Egypt and Tunisia, particularly in the former capitals of Mahdia (al-Mahdiyya) and Cairo (al-Qahira). At Mahdia, the most important surviving monument is Great Mosque. In Cairo, prominent examples include the Al-Azhar Mosque and the Al-Hakim Mosque, as well as the smaller monuments of al-Aqmar Mosque, the Mashhad of Sayyida Ruqayya, and the Mosque of al-Salih Tala'i. Al-Azhar Mosque, which was also a centre of learning and teaching known today as al-Azhar University, was named in honour of Fatimah (the daughter of Muhammad from whom the Fatimids claimed descent), who was called Az-Zahra (the brilliant). There were two main Fatimid palaces in Cairo, covering a huge area around Bayn al-Qasrayn, near Khan el-Khalili. Parts of the city walls constructed by Badr al-Jamali—most notably three of its gates—also survive.

The caliphs were buried in a mausoleum known as Turbat az-Za'faraan ("the Saffron Tomb"), located at the southern end of the eastern Fatimid palace in Cairo on the site now occupied by the Khan el-Khalili market. The remains of the early Fatimid caliphs in Ifriqiya were also transferred here when al-Mu'izz moved his capital to Cairo. However, the mausoleum was completely demolished by the Mamluk amir Jaharkas al-Khalili in 1385 to make way for the construction of a new merchant building (which gave its name to the present-day market). During the demolition, Jaharkas reportedly desecrated the bones of the Fatimid royal family by having them dumped into the rubbish hills east of the city.

== Legacy ==
After al-Mustansir, his sons Nizar al-Mustafa and al-Musta'li both claimed the right to rule, leading to the Ismailis splitting into the Nizari and Musta'li factions respectively. Nizar's successors eventually came to be known as the Aga Khans. Among Mustali's, another schism happened at the death of al-Amir in 1130. He was reportedly survived by his infant son al-Tayyib, who was then declared dead by al-Amir's cousin al-Hafiz, who took the caliphate. His supporters became the Hafizi branch, while his opponents, the Tayyibis, claimed al-Tayyib was alive and in hiding, and the true Imam. The Hafizi branch recognized the remaining Imam-caliphs till the dynasty's end in 1171. Meanwhile at-Tayyib's claim to the imamate was endorsed by Arwa al-Sulayhi, Queen of Yemen. By 1067, these Tayyibi Isma'ili missionaries spread their faith to India, leading to the development of various Isma'ili communities, most notably the Alavi, Dawoodi, and Sulaymani Bohras. Syedi Nuruddin went to Dongaon to look after southern India and Syedi Fakhruddin went to East Rajasthan.

== List of rulers ==
Family tree of Fatimid Caliphs

1. Al-Mahdi Billāh
2. Al-Qā'im
3. Al-Mansur
4. Al-Mu'izz
5. Al-Aziz
6. Al-Hakim
7. Al-Zahir
8. Al-Mustansir
Nizār al-Muṣṭafá (Nizārīyyah)	Muhammad	9. Al-Mustā'lī (Mustā'līyyah)
11. Al-Ḥāfīz (Ḥāfīzīyyah)	10. Al-Āmīr
12. Al-Zāfīr	Yūssuf	Aṭ-Ṭāyyīb (Ṭāyyībīyyah)
13. Al-Fā'īz	14. Al-'Āḍīd

== See also ==
- List of Shia dynasties
- Slavery in the Fatimid Caliphate

== Sources ==
- Abun-Nasr, Jamil (1987). A history of the Maghrib in the Islamic period. Cambridge: Cambridge University Press. ISBN 0521337674.
- Brett, Michael (2001). The Rise of the Fatimids: The World of the Mediterranean and the Middle East in the Fourth Century of the Hijra, Tenth Century CE. The Medieval Mediterranean. Vol. 30. Leiden: Brill. ISBN 978-9004117419.
- Brett, Michael (2017). The Fatimid Empire. The Edinburgh History of the Islamic Empires. Edinburgh: Edinburgh University Press. ISBN 978-0-7486-4076-8.
- Canard, Marius (1965). "Fāṭimids". In Lewis, B.; Pellat, Ch. & Schacht, J. (eds.). The Encyclopaedia of Islam, Second Edition. Volume II: C–G. Leiden: E. J. Brill. pp. 850–62. OCLC 495469475.
- Cortese, Delia, "Fatimids", in Muhammad in History, Thought, and Culture: An Encyclopedia of the Prophet of God (2 vols.), Edited by C. Fitzpatrick and A. Walker, Santa Barbara, ABC-CLIO, 2014, Vol I, pp. 187–91.
- Dachraoui, F. [in French] (1986). "al-Mahdī ʿUbayd Allāh". In Bosworth, C. E.; van Donzel, E.; Lewis, B. & Pellat, Ch. (eds.). The Encyclopaedia of Islam, Second Edition. Volume V: Khe–Mahi. Leiden: E. J. Brill. pp. 1242–44. ISBN 978-90-04-07819-2.
- Daftary, Farhad (2007). The Ismāʿı̄lı̄s: Their History and Doctrines (Second ed.). Cambridge: Cambridge University Press. ISBN 978-0-521-61636-2.
- Daftary, Farhad (1999). "Fatimids". In Yarshater, Ehsan (ed.). Encyclopædia Iranica. Vol. IX/4: Fārs II–Fauna III. London and New York: Routledge & Kegan Paul. pp. 423–26. ISBN 978-0-933273-32-0.
- Halm, Heinz (1991). Das Reich des Mahdi: Der Aufstieg der Fatimiden (in German). Munich: C.H. Beck. ISBN 978-3-406-35497-7.
  - English translation: Halm, Heinz (1996). The Empire of the Mahdi: The Rise of the Fatimids. Translated by Bonner, Michael. Brill. ISBN 9004100563.
- Halm, Heinz (2014). "Fāṭimids". In Fleet, Kate; Krämer, Gudrun; Matringe, Denis; Nawas, John; Rowson, Everett (eds.). Encyclopaedia of Islam (3rd ed.). Brill Online. ISSN 1873-9830.
- Hofer, Nathan (2017). "Sufism in Fatimid Egypt and The Problem of Historiographical Inertia". Journal of Islamic Studies. 28 (1): 28–67. doi:10.1093/jis/etw042.
- Kennedy, Hugh (2004) [1986]. The Prophet and the Age of the Caliphates: The Islamic Near East from the 6th to the 11th Century (Second ed.). Harlow: Longman. ISBN 978-0-582-40525-7.
- Köhler, Michael A. [in German] (2013). Hirschler, Konrad [in German] (ed.). Alliances and Treaties between Frankish and Muslim Rulers in the Middle East. Translated by Holt, Peter M. Leiden: Brill. ISBN 978-90-04-24890-8.
- Lev, Yaacov [in Russian] (1987). "Army, Regime, and Society in Fatimid Egypt, 358–487/968–1094". International Journal of Middle East Studies. 19 (3): 337–365. doi:10.1017/S0020743800056762. JSTOR 163658. S2CID 162310414.
- Lev, Yaacov (1995). "The Fatimids and Byzantium, tenth–12th Centuries". Graeco-Arabica. 6: 190–208. OCLC 183390203.
- Madelung, W. (1971). "Imāma". In Lewis, B.; Ménage, V. L.; Pellat, Ch. & Schacht, J. (eds.). The Encyclopaedia of Islam, Second Edition. Volume III: H–Iram. Leiden: E. J. Brill. pp. 1163–69. OCLC 495469525.
- Madelung, Wilferd (1978). "Ismāʿīliyya". In van Donzel, E.; Lewis, B.; Pellat, Ch. & Bosworth, C. E. (eds.). The Encyclopaedia of Islam, Second Edition. Volume IV: Iran–Kha. Leiden: E. J. Brill. pp. 198–206. ISBN 978-90-04-05745-6. OCLC 758278456.
- Madelung, W. (1986). "al-Mahdī". In Bosworth, C. E.; van Donzel, E.; Lewis, B. & Pellat, Ch. (eds.). The Encyclopaedia of Islam, Second Edition. Volume V: Khe–Mahi. Leiden: E. J. Brill. pp. 1230–38. ISBN 978-90-04-07819-2.
- O'Kane, Bernard (2016). The Mosques of Egypt. American University of Cairo Press. ISBN 978-9774167324.
- Raymond, André [in French] (1993). Le Caire (in French). Fayard.
- Raymond, André (2000). Cairo. Harvard University Press. ISBN 978-0-674-00316-3.
- Richards, Donald Sidney (2017). The Chronicle of Ibn al-Athir for the Crusading Period from al-Kamil fi'l-Ta'rikh. Part 1: The Years 491–541/1097–1146: The Coming of the Franks and the Muslim Response. Routledge. ISBN 978-1351892872.
- Runciman, Steven (1951), The History of the Crusades Volume I: The First Crusade and the Foundation of the Kingdom of Jerusalem, Cambridge University Press
- Sanders, Paula (1994). Ritual, Politics, and the City in Fatimid Cairo. Albany: State University of New York Press. ISBN 0-7914-1781-6.
- Sanders, Paula (1998). "The Fāṭimid state, 969–1171". In Petry, Carl F. (ed.). The Cambridge History of Egypt: Islamic Egypt, 640–1517. Vol. 1. Cambridge: Cambridge University Press. pp. 151–174. ISBN 0-521-47137-0.
- Walker, Paul E. (1998). "The Ismā'īlī Da'wa and the Fātimid caliphate". In Petry, Carl F. (ed.). The Cambridge History of Egypt: Islamic Egypt, 640–1517. Vol. 1. Cambridge: Cambridge University Press. pp. 120–150. ISBN 0-521-47137-0.
- Walker, Paul E. (2002). Exploring an Islamic Empire: Fatimid History and its Sources. London: I.B. Tauris. ISBN 978-1860646928.
- Walker, Paul E. (2018). "Fāṭimids". In Madelung, Wilferd; Daftary, Farhad (eds.). Encyclopaedia Islamica Online. Brill Online. ISSN 1875-9831.
