= Al-Hasan ibn Ammar al-Kalbi =

Al-Ḥasan ibn ʿAmmār al-Kalbī, usually called simply Ibn Ammar in the Arabic sources, was an Arab commander for the Fatimid Caliphate. A member of the Kalbid family, he was active in the wars with the Byzantine Empire in Sicily in the 960s, leading the capture of Taormina and Rometta, which completed the Muslim conquest of Sicily.

Some scholars identify him with "Abu Muhammad al-Hasan ibn Ali", also known as Ibn Ammar, a leader of the Kutama Berbers and chief minister (wāsiṭa) during the first year of the reign of the Fatimid Caliph al-Hakim bi-Amr Allah (r. 996–1021), but this is disputed.

== Biography ==
Hasan was the son of Ammar ibn Ali al-Kalbi, a member of the Kalbid family, which had come into prominence through Ammar's brother al-Hasan ibn Ali al-Kalbi. Along with Ahmad, Ammar fought in the wars with the Byzantine Empire in Sicily and southern Italy, and drowned during an abortive expedition against Otranto in 958.

Following the Byzantine reconquest of Crete in 960–961, the Fatimids once more turned their attention to Sicily, where they decided to reduce the remaining Byzantine outposts in the northeast and complete the Muslim conquest of the island. On Christmas Day 962 Hasan and his cousin Ahmad captured Taormina after a siege of seven and a half months, while on 24 August 963 Hasan laid siege to Rometta. The garrison of the latter sent for aid to Emperor Nikephoros II Phokas. The Emperor prepared a major expedition, allegedly 40,000 strong, which arrived in Italy in late 964. Learning of this, Hasan also sought reinforcements, which arrived under the command of his namesake uncle. The Byzantines attempted to relieve Rometta, and on 25 October 964 clashed with Hasan's army. The Byzantines were victorious in the initial engagement, but Hasan managed to rally his men and won a crushing victory. According to al-Maqrizi and Abu'l-Fida, more than 10,000 Byzantines fell, including the Emperor's nephew, Manuel Phokas, and several other commanders. The surviving Byzantines fled in panic, but were badly mauled again when the Arabs caught up with them in a defile ("Battle of the Pit", Waqʿat al-Ḥufra). The remnants of the Byzantine troops boarded their ships, but the Byzantine fleet was destroyed at the Battle of the Straits by Hasan's cousin Ahmad, sealing the fate of Rometta. The city surrendered a few months later, in early 965, after its provisions were exhausted and its inhabitants started fleeing the city.

== Disputed identity ==
Michael Brett and other scholars identify al-Hasan al-Kalbi with another Ibn Ammar, who in 971 led an army of Kutama Berbers to reinforce the Fatimid troops in Egypt, and who after the death of Caliph al-Aziz Billah (r. 975–996) became briefly regent with the title of wāsiṭa ("intermediary"), and led a staunchly pro-Berber regime that antagonized the other factions of the army, until he was overthrown by Barjawan in October 997. Other scholars consider the later Ibn Ammar to have himself been a Kutama Berber leader, under the name of "Abu Muhammad al-Hasan ibn Ali".

== Sources ==
- Bianquis, Thierry (1972). "La prise de pouvoir par les Fatimides en Égypte (357‑363/968‑974)" [The Seizure of Power by the Fatimids in Egypt (357–363/968–974)]. Annales Islamologiques (in French). XI: 49–108. doi:10.3406/anisl.1972.950. S2CID 259055451.
- Brett, Michael (2001). The Rise of the Fatimids: The World of the Mediterranean and the Middle East in the Fourth Century of the Hijra, Tenth Century CE. The Medieval Mediterranean. Vol. 30. Leiden: BRILL. ISBN 9004117415.
- Daftary, Farhad (2007). The Ismāʿı̄lı̄s: Their History and Doctrines (Second ed.). Cambridge: Cambridge University Press. ISBN 978-0-521-61636-2.
- Halm, Heinz (2003). Die Kalifen von Kairo: Die Fatimiden in Ägypten, 973-1074 [The Caliphs of Cairo: The Fatimids in Egypt, 973-1074] (in German). Munich: C. H. Beck. ISBN 3-406-48654-1.
- Kennedy, Hugh (2004). The Prophet and the Age of the Caliphates: The Islamic Near East from the 6th to the 11th Century (Second ed.). Harlow: Longman. ISBN 978-0-582-40525-7.
- Lev, Yaacov (1987). "Army, Regime, and Society in Fatimid Egypt, 358–487/968–1094" (PDF). International Journal of Middle East Studies. 19 (3): 337–365. doi:10.1017/S0020743800056762. JSTOR 163658. S2CID 162310414. Archived from the original (PDF) on 2020-02-12.
- Lilie, Ralph-Johannes; Ludwig, Claudia; Pratsch, Thomas; Zielke, Beate (2013). Prosopographie der mittelbyzantinischen Zeit Online. Berlin-Brandenburgische Akademie der Wissenschaften. Nach Vorarbeiten F. Winkelmanns erstellt (in German). Berlin and Boston: De Gruyter.
- Rizzitano, U. (1978). "Kalbids". In van Donzel, E.; Lewis, B.; Pellat, Ch. & Bosworth, C. E. (eds.). The Encyclopaedia of Islam, Second Edition. Volume IV: Iran–Kha. Leiden: E. J. Brill. pp. 496–497. OCLC 758278456.
- Walker, Paul E. (2002). Exploring an Islamic Empire: Fatimid History and its Sources. London: I.B. Tauris. ISBN 9781860646928.
