= Al-Hasan ibn Ali al-Kalbi =

Governor of Tunis, Emir of Sicily (911–964)

al-Hasan ibn Ali al-Kalbi

Emir of Sicily
- In office 948–953
- Succeeded by: Ahmad ibn al-Hasan al-Kalbi

Personal details
- Born: 911
- Died: November/December 964 (Aged 53) Palermo
- Relations: Ali ibn Abi'l-Husayn (father), Ahmad (son), Abu'l-Qasim Ali (son), Ammar ibn Ali (brother)

Military service
- Allegiance: Fatimid Caliphate
- Years of service: ca. 943–964
- Commands: Governor of Tunis, Emir of Sicily

Al-Hasan ibn Ali ibn Abi al-Husayn al-Kalbi (Arabic: ﺍﻟﺤﺴﻦ ﺍﺑﻦ ﻋﻠﻲ ﺍﺑﻦ ﺍﺑﻲ ﺍﻟﺤﺴﻴﻦ الكلبي, romanized: al-Ḥasan ibn ʿAlī ibn Abī al-Ḥusayn al-Kalbī), known in Byzantine sources as Boulchasenes (Greek: Βουλχάσενης) and Aboulchare (Ἀβουλχαρέ), was the first Kalbid Emir of Sicily. A member of an aristocratic family within the ruling circle of the Fatimid Caliphate, he helped suppress the great revolt of Abu Yazid in 943–947 and was sent as governor of Sicily from 948 until 953, when he returned to Ifriqiya. He was succeeded in Sicily by his son Ahmad ibn al-Hasan al-Kalbi, but led several campaigns in Sicily and southern Italy against the Byzantines in 955–958, as well as the raid against Almeria that sparked a brief conflict with the Caliphate of Córdoba in 955. He died at Palermo in 964, during another campaign against the Byzantines.

== Biography ==
As evidenced by his nisba, Hasan hailed from the Arab Banu Kalb tribe, and belonged to an aristocratic family established in Ifriqiya since the Muslim conquest of the Maghreb. The family had evidently embraced the Fatimid regime after the overthrow of the Aghlabids in 909, and his father Ali had served the Fatimids with distinction, being killed by the rebellious populace in Agrigento in 938, and both Hasan and his brother Ja'far were close associates of Jawdhar, the powerful chamberlain and chief minister of Caliph al-Mansur bi-Nasr Allah.

Hasan first came to prominence during the Kharijite revolt of Abu Yazid, which lasted from 944 to 947 and spread across Ifriqiya, almost resulting in the downfall of the Fatimid Caliphate. During this conflict, Hasan made Constantine his base, and with the aid of the Kutama Berbers was able to reclaim for the Fatimids the north of Ifriqiya, including Béja and Tunis, of which he was appointed governor.

=== Governorship of Sicily ===
Following the death of Abu Yazid and the end of his revolt, Caliph al-Mansur sent him to Sicily, where another revolt had broken out in Palermo in April 947, overthrowing the Fatimid governor, Ibn Attaf. At the same time the Byzantines, encouraged by Fatimid weakness, had stopped paying the tribute agreed in 932 for their possessions in Sicily and southern Italy. Sailing to Sicily, Hasan suppressed the rebellion in Palermo with such swiftness and severity that the Byzantines hastened to pay three years' worth of arrears of the tribute, although it is unclear whether this was done by the central government in Constantinople or was a local initiative.

At the same time, the Byzantines came into contact with the Fatimids' western rivals, the Umayyad Caliphate of Córdoba in al-Andalus, for joint action against the Fatimids. Emperor Constantine VII also sent reinforcements to Italy under the commanders Malakenos and Makroioannes, which arrived at Otranto and united with the local forces of the theme of Calabria under its strategos, Paschalios. In response, Hasan notified al-Mansur and asked for reinforcements. An army of 7,000 cavalry and 3,500 infantry was prepared, and under the command of the eunuch Faraj Muhaddad arrived at Palermo in June 951. A year later, in June/July, the two Fatimid commanders sailed from Sicily and invaded Calabria, attacking several towns, including Gerace and Cassano. The Byzantine troops not only failed to confront them, but withdrew to Bari, and the besieged towns preferred to ransom themselves rather than suffer the consequences of a sack. After Cassano, the Fatimids withdrew to their winter quarters at Messina, although al-Mansur had commanded them to remain in Italy.

The Caliph sharply rebuked the commanders and ordered them to return to the Italian mainland, but this did not happen until the next spring. On 7 May 952, Hasan defeated the Byzantine army under Malakenos and Paschalios at Gerace. He then laid siege to the town and sacked Petracucca. Following the defeat at Gerace, Constantine VII sent an envoy, John Pilatos, who arranged a truce with Hasan, followed by a treaty concluded on 7 September before al-Mansur. Not only did the Byzantines agree to resume payment of tribute, but before leaving Calabria, Hasan erected a mosque at Reggio and had the Byzantines swear to respect the Muslims' right to worship and call the prayer there, and that any Muslim prisoner who sought refuge there would be set free. The treaty also stipulated that, if "as much as a single stone" were removed from it, all churches in Sicily and Ifriqiya would be razed.

Following the death of al-Mansur on 19 March 953, Hasan returned to Ifriqiya to present himself to the new ruler, al-Mu'izz li-Din Allah. There he remained thereafter, retaining his position as one of the chief commanders, and as head of the Kalbid family. His post as governor in Sicily passed to his son Ahmad. This dynastic succession heralded the beginning of Kalbid rule over Sicily as Fatimid viceroys, which lasted until the civil strife and the political fragmentation of the island in the 1030s.

=== Naval war against the Umayyads and Byzantines ===
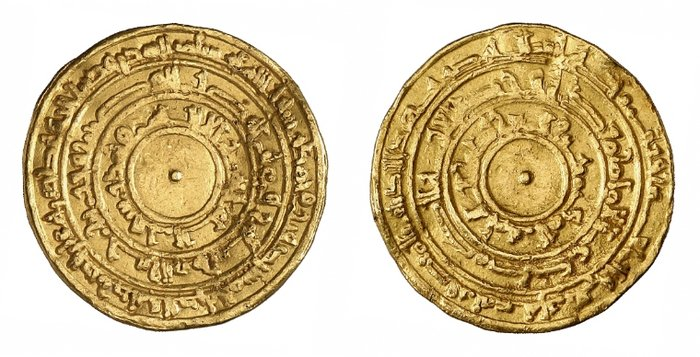
Gold dinar of al-Mu'izz

In 955, war was renewed, when an Andalusian merchant ship intercepted a Fatimid ship carrying diplomatic correspondence; fearing that it would alert Fatimid privateers, the Andalusians not only removed its rudder, but took along the case containing the dispatches it carried. Enraged, al-Mu'izz ordered Hasan to pursue, but he was unable to catch the ship before it reached the port of Almeria. Without hesitating, Hasan took his squadron into the harbour, plundered it and the arsenal, burned the Umayyad ships anchored there, and returned to Ifriqiya. The Umayyads responded by sending admiral Ghalib with a fleet of 70 vessels to Ifriqiya. The Umayyad fleet raided the port of al-Kharaz and the environs of Susa and Tabarqa.

Fatimid sources report that the Umayyads proposed joint action with Byzantium, but although an expeditionary force under Marianos Argyros was sent to Italy, it occupied itself with suppressing local revolts rather than engaging the Fatimids, and the Byzantine envoys offered to renew and extend the existing truce. Al-Mu'izz however, determined to expose the Umayyads' collaboration with the infidel enemy and emulate the achievements of his father, refused. The Caliph dispatched two fleets to Sicily, the first under Hasan's brother Ammar ibn Ali al-Kalbi, and the second later under Hasan himself and Jawhar al-Siqilli. The Fatimid sources report that the Byzantine fleet was heavily defeated in the Straits of Messina, and that the Fatimids plundered Calabria, whereupon Marianos Argyros visited the caliphal court and arranged for a renewal of the truce. In 957 however the Byzantines under the protokarabos Basil destroyed the mosque at Reggio and raided Termini, near Palermo. Hasan suffered heavy losses in a storm off Mazara, which dispersed his fleet and killed many of the crews; the survivors were then attacked by the Byzantines, who destroyed 12 ships. Another effort by Argyros to renew the truce in autumn failed. In the next year, Hasan and Ammar fought a sea battle against the Byzantine navy, after which the Fatimid fleet was again wrecked in a storm, in which Ammar perished (on 24 September 958, according to the Cambridge Chronicle). As a result, al-Mu'izz accepted the proposals for a renewed five-year truce in 958.

=== Rometta campaign ===
Following the Byzantine reconquest of Crete in 960–961, where the Fatimids, constrained by their truce with the Empire and the distances involved, were unable or unwilling to interfere, the Fatimids once more turned their attention to Sicily, where they decided to reduce the remaining Byzantine outposts: Taormina, the forts in the Val Demone and Val di Noto, and Rometta. Taormina fell to Hasan's son Ahmad on Christmas Day 962, after more than nine months of siege, and in the next year his cousin, al-Hasan ibn Ammar al-Kalbi, laid siege to Rometta. The garrison of the latter sent for aid to Emperor Nikephoros II Phokas, who prepared a major expedition, led by the patrikios Niketas Abalantes and his own nephew, Manuel Phokas, which landed at Messina in October 964. At the same time, Hasan led Berber troops as reinforcements to Sicily to assist the efforts to capture Rometta. While the Fatimid army defeated the Byzantines before Rometta and then destroyed their fleet at the Battle of the Straits, Hasan himself remained in Palermo, where he died in November/December 964 at the age of 53.

== Sources ==
- Brett, Michael (2001). The Rise of the Fatimids: The World of the Mediterranean and the Middle East in the Fourth Century of the Hijra, Tenth Century CE. The Medieval Mediterranean. Vol. 30. Leiden: BRILL. ISBN 9004117415.
- Halm, Heinz (1996). The Empire of the Mahdi: The Rise of the Fatimids. Handbook of Oriental Studies. Vol. 26. Translated by Michael Bonner. Leiden: BRILL. ISBN 9004100563.
- Lev, Yaacov (1984). "The Fāṭimid Navy, Byzantium and the Mediterranean Sea, 909–1036 CE/297–427 AH". Byzantion: Revue internationale des études byzantines. 54 (1): 220–252. ISSN 0378-2506. JSTOR 44170866.
- Lilie, Ralph-Johannes; Ludwig, Claudia; Pratsch, Thomas; Zielke, Beate (2013). Prosopographie der mittelbyzantinischen Zeit Online. Berlin-Brandenburgische Akademie der Wissenschaften. Nach Vorarbeiten F. Winkelmanns erstellt (in German). Berlin and Boston: De Gruyter.
- Metcalfe, Alex (2009), The Muslims of Medieval Italy, Edinburgh: Edinburgh University Press, ISBN 978-0-7486-2008-1

Preceded by Ibn Attaf as Fatimid governor of Sicily	Kalbid emir of Sicily (for the Fatimid Caliphate); 948–953	Succeeded by Ahmad ibn al-Hasan al-Kalbi
