= Siege of Jerusalem (1099) =

Christian conquest of the First Crusade

- Part of First Crusade
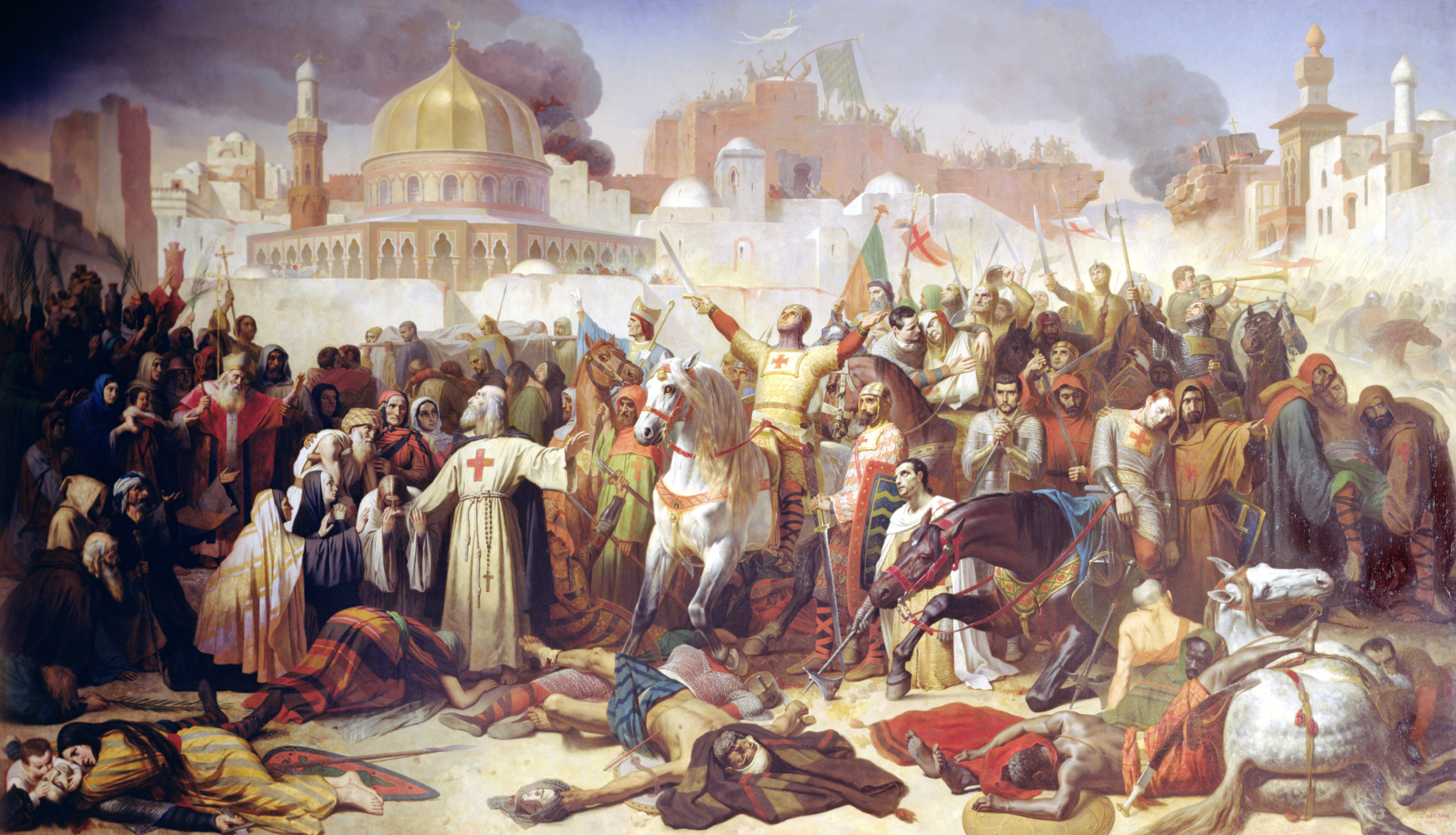
- Taking of Jerusalem by the Crusaders, 15th July 1099 painting by Émile Signol (1847), Palace of Versailles
| Date | 7 June 1099 – 15 July 1099 (1 month, 1 week and 1 day) |
| Location | Jerusalem 31°46′36″N 35°14′03″E |
| Result | Crusader victory |
| Territorial changes | Founding of the Kingdom of Jerusalem |

Belligerents
| Crusaders | Fatimid Caliphate |

Commanders and leaders
| Godfrey of Bouillon; Raymond IV of Toulouse; Robert II of Normandy; Robert II of Flanders; Tancred of Galilee; Gaston IV of Béarn | Iftikhar ad-Dawla (surrendered) |

Strength
| Total 12,000–14,000 | Total 3,000~4,500 |

Casualties and losses
| | 3,000~10,000 Muslims and Jews killed |
- Site of the siege relative to the Mediterranean

The siege of Jerusalem from 7 June 1099 to 15 July 1099 marked the successful end of the First Crusade, and the founding of the Kingdom of Jerusalem soon afterwards. The siege was carried out by the Christian forces of Western Europe mobilized by Pope Urban II after the Council of Clermont in 1095. The city had been out of Christian control since the Muslim conquest of the Levant in 637 and had been held for a century first by the Seljuk Turks and later by the Egyptian Fatimids. After an initial unsuccessful attack on 13 June, the crusaders constructed several siege engines including a siege tower and a battering ram enable them to enter the city on 15 July 1099. Following the siege thousands of Muslims and Jews were massacred by the Crusaders.

== Background ==
In 1095, Pope Urban II called for a crusade at the Council of Clermont (Deos lo vult). In addition to aiding Byzantium, which was under threat from the Seljuks, the goal was to reach the Holy Land and liberate Jerusalem. Following their departure from Constantinople in April 1097 and their crossing of the Taurus Mountains, the main forces of the First Crusade reached northern Syria in the fall of 1097. While Baldwin of Boulogne marched eastward and, in the spring of 1098, founded the first Crusader state, the County of Edessa, the main army laid siege at Antioch in October 1097. After the city fell in June 1098 and the subsequent victory over a Seljuk relief army led by Kerbogha, the advance came to a standstill.

Months of political power struggles among the leaders between Bohemond of Taranto and Raymond IV of Toulouse, as well as epidemics and supply shortages, delayed the advance. Upon taking command Raymond of Toulouse resumed the march southward in January 1099. Following the Levantine coastline, the troops avoided protracted sieges of heavily fortified cities. Instead, they concluded agreements with local Muslim rulers, or paid tribute. At the end of May 1099, the army left the coastal region at Jaffa and reached the vicinity of Jerusalem on 7 June, 1099.

== Prelude ==
Since the 10th century Jerusalem had been under Fatimid rule. The defences of the city dated back to the time of Emperor Hadrian and had been maintained and reinforced since then.The stone walls around the city stretching four kilometers long, were three meters thick and 15 meters high. There were five major gates each guarded by a pair of towers.The city was protected on three sides by steep valleys and gorges: to the east by the Kidron Valley, to the southeast by the Hinnom Valley, and to the west by the Tyropeon Valley. Only the southwest, over Mount Zion and along the entire length of the northern wall, offered terrain favorable for an attack.

Upon learning that a Christian army was marching to Jerusalem Iftikhar ad-Dawla the Wālī (Governor) of the city began making preparations to defend the city. He made sure that no resources, whether water, food or wood were available for his enemies in the vicinity of the city. He also expelled Syrian Christians who might be sympathetic to the crusading army, whereas all Jewish were permitted to stay.Anticipating that the crusaders would built siege engines, he ordered all available timber and rope to be used for build more mangonels for the city. In the event that the Crusader machines proved capable of damaging the stone walls Iftikhar ordered to sew bags filled with straw to be placed at strategic points beside the walls. These bags could be lowered on ropes to buffer the impact of flying rocks.

From the estimated 20,000 to 75,000 troops that have assembled at Nicaea between 12,000 and 14,000 had reached Jerusalem on 7 June. The cavalry consisted of 1,200–1,300 men.The garrison defending Jerusalem comprised roughly some thousand Arab and Sudanese troops as well as some 400 egyptian elite cavalry.

With most wells and cisterns rendered unusable, the crusaders faced a lack of water supply. The conditions were further exacerbated by heat, lack of shade and the khamsin. The only source of water, was the En-Gihon, a spring that flowed from the southeast spur of the city. It lay below the ridge that held the very first human settlements in the area, known in ancient times as Zion. Although Gihon could deliever over a million litres a day during the winter month in summer the overall flow dropped considerably. In opposite, the people of Jerusalem obtained all the water from deep cisterns. In addition, there were hundreds of smaller cisterns located under houses and courtyards across the city, which were fed by a system of pipes and channels from flat roofs and paved streets.

Since the Crusaders had insufficient forces to besiege the entire city, they concentrated their strength on the sectors where they could approach the walls. Robert of Normandy posted his troops along the northern wall, opposite the Gate of Flowers (also known as Herod's Gate). Robert of Flanders was stationed on his right, facing the Gate of the Column (also known as St Stephen's Gate or the Damascus Gate). Godfrey of Lorraine covered the north-west corner of the city, extending down to the Jaffa Gate. Tancred joined him here, riding up when the army was already in position and bringing flocks he had acquired on his way from Bethlehem. Raymond of Toulouse stood to the south. Finding that the valley kept him too far from the walls, he moved up to Mount Zion after two or three days. The eastern and south-eastern sectors were left unguarded.

== Siege ==
Battle map showing Jerusalem at the begin of the siege

According to Raymond of Aguilers the first attack was initiated by a prophecy of an old hermit claiming that if the crusaders would attack on 13 June until the ninth hour, it would fall to them. During the night, the army prepared to attack the city using whatever materials they could find. (Note: It is not clear whether Godfrey, Raymond, Robert of Normandy, or Robert of Flanders considered the attack absurd or not. In any case, it seems they didn't dare oppose the mounting excitement.)Despite initial success the attack proved to be a failure, demonstrating the need for more siege engines.

Two days after the failed attack on Jerusalem on June 13, 1099, the leaders of the crusade met to discuss their strategy. Recognizing that divine intervention would not yield the city, they were confronted by the harsh realities acknowledging that the situation, favoured the defenders of Jerusalem. The issue of water supply worsend, leading to deaths from thirst and ambushes while seeking fresh water. The difficulties in obtaining enough water for both the crusaders and their horses threatened their strength and morale, making it unlikely the siege could last months, especially in the Palestinian summer heat. Additionally, rumors indicated that the vizier of Cairo, al-Afdal, was gathering an army to relieve Jerusalem, giving the crusaders only a fortnight to capture the city.

With the option of a long siege to starve the garrison ruled out there were two options left: breaking the walls or climbing over them. While the city's defenses were robust, they were not as formidable as those of Nicea or Antioch. The primary barrier was the inner wall, which stood 12 to 15 meters tall but was not very thick. Built by Fatimid governors after a 1033 earthquake, the wall was drawn closer to the city, using materials from ruined buildings, which excluded some key areas like Mount Zion and the Pool of Siloam but allowed for a stronger, more defensible structure with a shorter perimeter.

After the Seljuk conquest of Jerusalem in 1073, governors such as Atsiz ibn Uwaq, Turtush, and Artug, along with his sons Ilghazi and Suqman, had construced a deep ditch around much of the city to prevent scaling or the use of siege towers. To fortify David's Tower, a dry moat (19 meters wide and 7 meters deep) was dug, isolating it from the city and requiring bridge access. This ditch extended north along the west wall to the Goliath Citadel and further north, becoming a stronghold measuring up to 7 meters deep and 19 meters wide towards the Kidron Valley. A similar ditch reinforced the southern wall.

Moreover, the Seljuks had constructed an extra line of defenses just inside the ditch, consisting of outlying strongpoints, and a subsequent outer wall. This outer wall did not present a significant challenge to attackers, on 13 June the crusaders had dismantled a section with pick axes before advancing to the taller inner wall. Its purpose was to obstruct the line of flight of stones cast on low trajectories from mangonels, preventing the missiles from striking low down on the inner wall. The outer wall was not an independent structure; it was linked to the city at multiple points, which created confined ‘no-man’s land’ zones between the two walls, further complicating the assault for any attackers.

=== Construction of siege engines ===
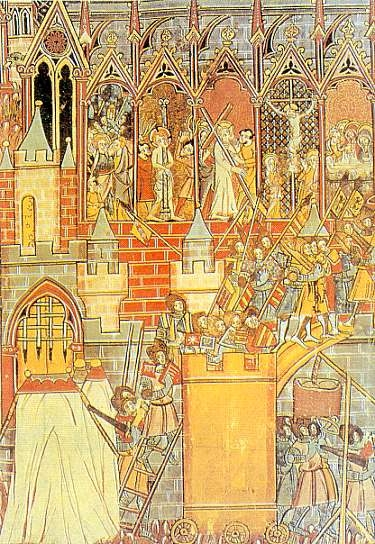
Illustration of an unknown creator showing the use of the siege tower in front.

On 17 June the Crusaders heard about the arrival of English and Genoese ships at the port of Jaffa. The English and Genoese sailors had brought all the necessary material with them for the construction of the siege equipment. Searches for timber were also successful. Suitable wood was found over 50 km away, near Nablus. According to Albert of Aachen, a local Christian showed the Franks where to find timber. Ralph of Caen states that Tancred, who was suffering from dysentery, came upon a cave containing around 400 beams of wood while seeking privacy during one of the searches for timber. The beams had been conveniently left there by the Fatimids, perhaps from their siege of the Seljuks. Under the command of Guglielmo Embriaco and Gaston of Béarn, the Crusaders began the construction of siege engines. They constructed the siege equipment in almost three weeks. This included two massive wheel-mounted siege towers, a battering ram with an iron-clad head, and numerous scaling ladders and a series of portable wattle screens.

=== Situation within the city ===
The remaining Christians in Jerusalem faced hostility and mistrust from the local population and harsh commands from Iftikhar. Struggling households were forced to share scarce food and endure heavy taxes, with several key figures captured to enforce compliance. The Christian community was compelled to perform labor, including carrying heavy loads at all hours, facing physical coercion from Muslim soldiers. Skilled tradespeople were obligated to work on city defenses, and their homes were often dismantled for materials. Furthermore, they were at risk of being falsely accused of espionage for the crusaders. In reality, some Christians did indeed try to help their fellow believers outside the walls. Tancred, in particular, was collaborating with Syrian Christians outside the walls to establish contacts within the city.

=== Situation outside the city ===
The question of who would become ruler of Jerusalem once it had been conquered was constantly present. The leading contender for the honour was Count Raymond of Toulouse. If the Provençal contingent preserved its unity, they could likely assert Raymond's control over the captured city, given that they formed the single largest regional faction within the crusading force. But there were signs of severe tension among the Provençal contingent, particularly between the more loyal followers of the Count and the less dedicated knights. The former followers of Bishop Adhémar, although stationed in the southern camp, were more interested in the regular payments from Count Raymond’s huge war chest. Furthermore, the large number of impoverished non-combatant crusaders who camped with Count Raymond at Mount Zion acted with impunity. Overall, it was far from guaranteed that Raymond could rally everyone to ensure his future rule over Jerusalem.

By contrast, the tone in the northern camp was much more harmonious, despite the diverse composition of the crusading army, comprising many different languages and regions. As Robert of Normandy and Robert of Flanders were eager to fulfil their vows and return home, there was only one obvious choice for the lordship of Jerusalem: Godfrey of Lotharingia. While Tancred aspired to rule towns, cities, principalities and kingdoms, he only had about 40 knights willing to follow him. Thus he accepted the necessity of supporting Godfrey.The physical hardships, coupled with disappointment at the failure of the initial attack and renewed disputes between the princes, caused many crusaders to abandon the crusade. According to Raymond of Aguilers a band of crusaders went down to the river Jordan for rebaptism. After gathering palm branches they moved to Jaffa, hoping to find ships to bring them back to Europe.

=== Penitential procession ===
The Crusaders received another morale boost when Peter Desiderius (chaplain to Count Isoard I of Die) claimed in early July to have had a vision of Adhémar, the papal legate. In this vision, he called for a fast and a bare-footed march around the besieged city, leading to an imminent assault aimed at capturing Jerusalem. Peter Desiderius, rather than informing Count Raymond about the vision of victory from Adhémar, sought counsel from Count Isoard I of Die and William Hugh of Monteil, Adhémar’s brother. Previously, tensions had arisen among the Provencals during the siege of Arqa, with some followers of Adhémar protesting and abandoning Raymond due to unresolved divisions regarding their leadership.

Upon learning about the vision, Provencal clergy advised Desiderius to present the procession around Jerusalem as a conciliatory gesture and to avoid any mention of Adhémar’s involvement in order to prevent counterreactions, particularly from factions in the northern camp. It was suggested that he seek support from influential figures such as the Norman bishop Arnulf of Chocques and Peter the Hermit; but Desiderius found this difficult, given the role Arnulf had played in the trial and death of Peter Bartholomew, as well as his own strained relations with Peter the Hermit, who had regained influence as a recognized benefactor of the poor in the wake of the ongoing crusade.

On July 6, 1099, a general assembly of the entire army took place. Under the leadership of Peter Desiderius, Christian clergy and the common people gathered, inspired by a shared desire for unity between the two factions of the army. This meeting resulted in a penitential procession that was met with widespread enthusiasm and even forced the princes to conform to public sentiment. The following day, July 8, the entire besieging army took part in a barefoot march to the Mount of Olives led by bishops and priests, during which religious symbols were carried.

=== Final attack ===
It was decided that the assault should begin during the night of 13-14 July. The main attack would be launched simultaneously from Mount Zion and on the eastern sector of the northern wall, with a feint attack on the north-west angle. On the morning of 14 July, just beyond the north wall of the city, a large group of Christian knights and foot soldiers had gathered. Behind the front ranks of professional warriors were elderly men, young boys, and women. Behind the combatants stood the clergy, singing liturgies and calling out to God for aid.

In the northern army Robert of Normandy and Robert of Flanders had united their armies in order to fight side by side. Their task was to close to the walls and with an combined attack from the archers and the throwing machines prevent the defenders from gathering at the critical points. To the east a larger body of crusaders under the command of Godfrey gathered behind a battering ram. The southern army had formed up in the same way, with men at arms and knights at the front and poor men, women, and children behind them. Similarly, the clergy began the day with chants and prayers. They also began pushing and pulling the siege tower into position. (Note: The tower was covered with layers of hide skins soaked in vinegar the only way thought to quench Greek fire back then.)

The plan was to bring the tower close enough to the city walls that they could overlook the defences and clear away the defenders while the ram did its work at the base of the wall. If they were able to dominate a stretch of the city wall, it might even become possible to successfully place ladders against the defences and scale the walls of the city. Moving the battering ram into position by pulling ropes ahead and pushing with poles from behind it was to lead the assault. Expecting the attack at the northern wall Iftikhar had positioned his troops there. Being part of the Jewish quarter Fatimid archers and siege crews were supported by local civilians providing resources and attacking crusaders. The city’s towers enabled effective defense, with mangonels targeting siege towers and opposing stone throwers.

With the sound of trumpets from the north and the south under a roar of God wills it the crusaders started their attack. Despite constant attack from arrow fire and flying stones the northern army were able to bring their ram into position. At the same time the siege tower were also advancing inflicting many casualties on the garrison. At the evening a victory seems to be at hand. In the north the battering ram inflicted increasing damage on the city wall despite heavy countershooting and attempts to set it on fire. Having managed to pierce through the wall the cursaders failed to exploit their success as the ram were stuck. Forced to abandon the ram the momentum of the attack was lost. With no prospect of clearing the walls sufficiently to bring up ladders and the path for the siege tower blocked by the ram the general attack was stopped.

=== Crusaders enter Jerusalem ===
There were heavy casualties, probably numbering a fifth or a quarter of the Western armies. Signallers stationed on the Mount of Olives used reflectors to maintain contact between the split troops. At midday on Friday 15 July, the attack was resumed. According to Albert of Aachen, a golden cross was placed on the top of the tower. When the tower was pushed right up against the wall, the cursaders were able to enter the city. Governor al-Dawla managed to escape. The aftermath of the siege led to the mass slaughter of thousands of Muslims and Jews which contemporaneous sources describe as savage, as well as to the conversion of Muslim holy sites on the Temple Mount into Christian shrines.

Atrocities committed against the inhabitants of cities taken by storm after a siege were normal in ancientand medieval warfare by both Christians and Muslims. The Crusaders had already done so at Antioch, and Fatimids had done so themselves at Taormina, at Rometta, and at Tyre. Unlike later accounts, such as that written by Wilhelm von Tyros 90 years after the massacre, the actual eyewitnesses like Raymond of Aguilers, the Anonymi, or Albert of Aachen make no mention of any regret or remorse on the part of the crusaders. The bloodshed was not viewed as the killing of innocents but as a triumph of God.

Christian, Muslim, and Jewish accounts alike describe the atrocities committed during the capture of Jerusalem in 1099 as an extreme bloodbath in which women and children were not spared, and in which, according to eyewitnesses, the blood on the Temple Mount reached up to the ankles or the reins. While Jewish residents defended the city alongside the Muslims and were eventually burned alive by the Crusaders in their synagogue, Christian sources such as Albert of Aachen even mention a second mass execution days after the actual victory, targeting those who had initially been spared in exchange for ransom. Also documented is the retreat of some Muslims to the Tower of David and the safe departure following negotiations of Governor Iftikhar and others to Ascalon. Jews were also spared provided they left Jerusalem voluntarily.

Raymond of Aguilers describes the brutality of the massacre in detail:

Tancred and Godfrey in the vanguard spilled an incredible amount of blood, and their comrades, close at their heels, now brought suffering to the Saracens. Now I must tell you of an astonishing circumstance; namely, in one part of the city resistance had practically ceased, but in the area near Mount Zion the Saracens fought fiercely with Raymond’s forces as if they had not been defeated. With the fall of Jerusalem and its towers one could see marvelous works. Some of the pagans were mercifully beheaded, others pierced by arrows plunged from towers, and yet others, tortured for a long time, were burned to death in searing flames. Piles of heads, hands, and feet Jay in the houses and streets, and indeed there was a running to and fro of men and knights over the corpses.

== Aftermath ==
=== Casualties ===
There are no reliable figures on how many people were actually killed during the siege and the subsequent massacre. Claims of 70,000 or even 100.000 deaths from contemporary Arab sources are rather unrealistic given the population at the time of about 30,000. Modern estimates put the number of casualties at between 3,000 and 10,000.

=== Founding of the Latin Kingdom ===
On 17 July, a council was held on the Dome of Rock to discuss who would be crowned the king of Jerusalem. On 22 July, Godfrey of Bouillon, who had played the most fundamental role in the city's conquest, was made Advocatus Sancti Sepulchri ("advocate" or "defender" of the Holy Sepulchre). He would not accept the title of king, saying that he refused to wear a crown of gold in the city where Christ wore a crown of thorns. Until his death on 18 July 1100 Godfrey was able to consolidate his rule defeating a Fatimid army at the Battle of Ascalon on 12 August 1099 and the subsequently capture of Arsuf by the end of the year. In order to prevent Daibert of Pisa from taking the city Godfrey´s brother was asked to come to Jerusalem and take over the heritage. Upon his arrival in November 1100 Baldwin was crowned on Christmas day in the Church of the Nativity becoming the first King of Jerusalem.

== Bibliography ==
- of Aachen, Albert (2013). History of the Journey to Jerusalem. Translated by Edgington, Susan. Surrey: Ashgate Publishing Limited. ISBN 978-1-40946-652-9.
- d'Aguilers, Raymond (1968). Historia Francorum qui ceperunt Iherusalem. Translated by Hill, John Hugh; Hill, Laurita L. Philadelphia: The American Philosophical Society.
- Angold, Micheal; et al. (The Cambridge History of The Byzantine Empire c. 500-1492) (2008). Jonathan Shepard (ed.). Belle époque or crisis (1025 – 1118). Cambridge: Cambridge University Press. ISBN 978-0-521-83231-1.
- Asbridge, Thomas S. (2004). The First Crusade A New History: The Roots of Conflict between Christianity and Islam. Oxford University Press. ISBN 978-0-7432-2084-2.
- Cartwright, Mark (2018). "The Capture of Jerusalem, 1099 CE". worldhistory.org.
- Boas, Adrian (2001). Jerusalem In The Time Of The Crusades. London: Routledge. ISBN 0-415-23000-4.
- Gravett, Christopher (2002). Medieval Siege Warfare. Oxford: Osprey Publishing. ISBN 1-84176-531-7.
- Gibb, Hamilton Alexander Rosskeen (2003). The Damascus Chronicle of the Crusades: Extracted and Translated from the Chronicle of Ibn Al-Qalanisi. Dover Publications. ISBN 0-4-8642-519-3.
- Hirschler, Konrad (2014). "The Jerusalem Conquest of 492/1099 in the Medieval Arabic Historiography of the Crusades: From Regional Plurality to Islamic Narrative". Crusades. 13 (1). doi:10.1080/28327861.2014.12220390.
- Hosler, John D. (2022). Jerusalem Falls: Seven Centuries of War and Peace. New Haven: Yale University Press. ISBN 978-0-300-26869-0.
- Kedar, Benjamin Z. (2023). "The Jerusalem Massacre of July 1099 in the Western Historiography of the Crusades". Crusades. 3 (1). doi:10.1080/28327861.2004.12220041.
- Kostick, Conor (2009). The Siege of Jerusalem. London: Bloomsbury. ISBN 1-84725-231-1.
- Krey, August. C. (1921). The First Crusade: The Accounts of Eyewitnesses and Participants. Princeton: Princeton University Press.
- Krey, August C.; Duncan, Frederick, eds. (1912). Parallel Source Problems in Medieval History. New York: Harper & Brothers.
- Madden, Thomas F. (2006). The new Concise history of the Crusades. Lanham, Md.: Rowman & Littlefield. ISBN 0-74253-823-0.
- Madden, Thomas F. (2012). "Rivers of Blood: An Analysis of One Aspect of the Crusader Conquest of Jerusalem in 1099". Revista Chilena de Estudios Medievales. Santiago de Chile: Universidad Gabriela Mistral. ISSN 0719-2215.
- Murray, Allan V. (2000). The Crusader Kingdom of Jerusalem: A Dynastic History 1099-1125. Oxford: Prosopographica et Genealogica. ISBN 1-900934-03-5.
- Nicolle, David (2003). The First Crusade 1096-1099: Conquest of the Holy Land. Oxford: Osprey Publishing. ISBN 1-84176-515-5.
- Oldenbourg, Zoe (1966). The Crusades. New York: Pantheon Books.
- Riley-Smith, Jonathan; et al. (The New Cambridge Medieval History) (2004). "The crusades, 1095-1198". In Luscome, David; Riley-Smith, Jonathan (eds.). c. 1024 – c. 1198 Part I. Vol. IV. Cambridge: Cambridge University Press. ISBN 978-0-521-41410-4.
- Runciman, Steven (1957). The First Crusade. A History of the Crusades. Vol. I. Cambridge: Cambridge University Press.
- Tyerman, Christopher (2006). God's War: A New History of the Crusades. Cambridge, Mass.: Harvard University Press. ISBN 0-6-7402-387-0.
