= Ya'ish =

Ya'ish was the governor of Sicily for the Fatimid Caliphate in 969–970.

Ya'ish was a freedman (mawla) of al-Hasan ibn Ali al-Kalbi, the first member of the Kalbid dynasty to become governor of Sicily in 948–953. Hasan was replaced by his son, Ahmad, who ruled Sicily until his recall to North Africa in 969, with Ya'ish replacing him. Ya'ish however proved unable to quell the factional quarrels within his province between different Berber tribes. As a result, he was replaced in June 970 by Ahmad's brother, Ali.

== Sources ==
- Lilie, Ralph-Johannes; Ludwig, Claudia; Pratsch, Thomas; Zielke, Beate (2013). Prosopographie der mittelbyzantinischen Zeit Online. Berlin-Brandenburgische Akademie der Wissenschaften. Nach Vorarbeiten F. Winkelmanns erstellt (in German). Berlin and Boston: De Gruyter.

Preceded by Ahmad ibn al-Hasan al-Kalbi	Fatimid governor of Sicily; 969–970	Succeeded by Abu'l-Qasim Ali ibn al-Hasan al-Kalbi
