= Muslim Sicily =

Period of Sicilian history under Islamic rule from 827 to 1091

Ṣiqilliya صِقِلِّيَة (Arabic)
- 827–1091
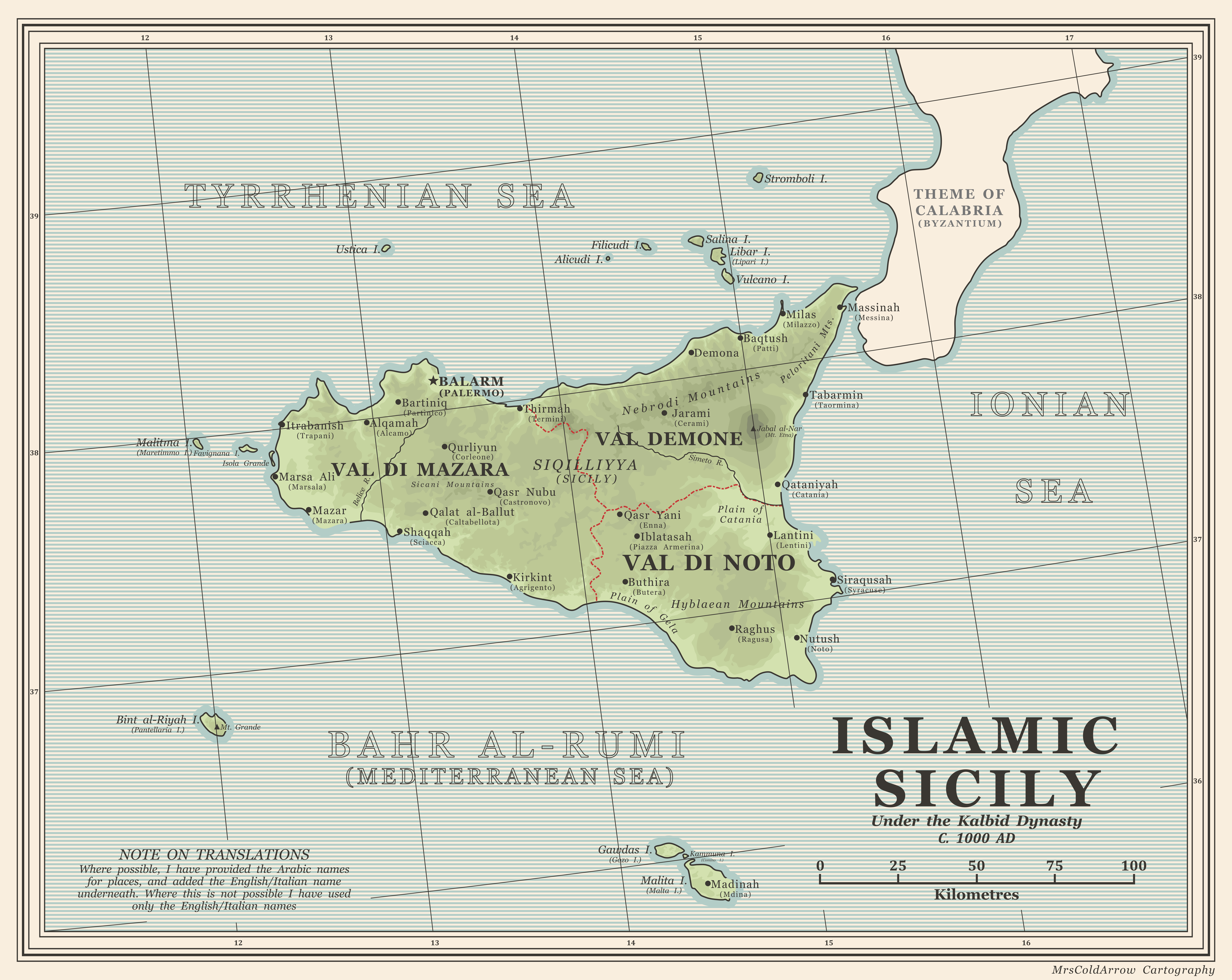
- Muslim Sicily in 1000 AD.
- Status: Province of the Aghlabid Emirate (827–909); Province of the Fatimid Caliphate (909–948); Autonomous emirate under the Kalbids (948–1044); Various emirates in conflict (After 1044)
- Capital: Palermo; 38°06′40″N 13°21′06″E
- Official languages: Classical Arabic
- Common languages: Sicilian Arabic; Sicilian; Byzantine Greek; Berber languages; Judeo-Arabic
- Religion: Islam (official); Sunni Islam; Shia Islam (Kalbids); Chalcedonian Christianity; Judaism
- Government: Monarchy
- Historical era: Middle Ages
  - Established: 827
  - Disestablished: 1091
- Currency: Tarì; dirham
Preceded by	Succeeded by
Theme of Sicily (Byzantine Empire under the Amorian dynasty)	County of Sicily
- Today part of: Italy; Malta

The island of Sicily (Arabic: صِقِلِّيَة, romanized: Ṣiqilliya) was under Islamic rule from the late ninth to the late eleventh centuries. It became a prosperous and influential commercial power in the Mediterranean, (Note: William Dalrymple on Sicily's Islamic past. Financial Times (Jan. 9, 2021). "The prosperity this generated led to Sicily, and especially Palermo, becoming a rich hub in the trading networks of the Mediterranean, the meeting place for merchants from the Middle East, north Africa and the young Italian trading republics.") with its capital of Palermo (بَلَرْم, Balarm) serving as a major cultural and political center of the Muslim world.

Sicily was a peripheral part of the Byzantine Empire when Muslim forces from Ifriqiya (roughly present-day Tunisia) began launching raids in 652. During the reign of the Aghlabid dynasty of Ifriqiya, a prolonged series of conflicts from 827 to 902 resulted in the gradual conquest of the entire island, with only the stronghold of Rometta, in the far northeast, holding out until 965. The Fatimid Caliphate replaced Aghlabid rule after 909. From 948 onwards, the island was governed by the Kalbid dynasty, who ruled as autonomous emirs while formally acknowledging Fatimid authority.

Under Muslim rule, Sicily became multiconfessional and multilingual, developing a distinct Arab-Byzantine culture that combined elements of its Islamic Arab and Berber migrants with those of the local Latin, Greek, and Jewish communities. Lucrative new crops were introduced, advanced irrigation systems were built, and urban centers were beautified with gardens and public works; the resulting wealth led to a flourishing of art and science.

Beginning in the early eleventh century, political authority began to fracture from internal strife and dynastic disputes. Christian Norman mercenaries under Roger I ultimately conquered the island, founding the County of Sicily in 1071; the last Muslim city on the island, Noto, fell in 1091, marking the end of independent Islamic rule in Sicily. As the first Count of Sicily, Roger maintained relative tolerance and multiculturalism; Sicilian Muslims remained citizens. Until the late twelfth century, and probably as late as the 1220s, Muslims formed a majority of the island's population, and even occupied positions in the royal court. But by the mid thirteenth century, Muslims who had not already left or converted to Christianity were expelled, ending roughly four hundred years of Islamic presence in Sicily.

Over two centuries of Islamic rule has left some traces in modern Sicily. Minor Arabic influence remains in the Sicilian language and in local place names; a much larger influence is in the Maltese language that derives from Siculo-Arabic. Other cultural remnants can be found in the island's agricultural methods and crops, cuisine, and architecture.

== History ==
=== Early Muslim conquest of Sicily ===
In 535, Emperor Justinian I reconquered Sicily for the Roman Empire, which by then was ruled from Constantinople. As the power of what is now known as the Byzantine Empire waned in the West, a new and expansionist power was emerging in the Middle East: the Rashidun Caliphate, the first major Muslim state to emerge following the death of the Islamic prophet Muhammad in 632. Over a period of twenty five years, the caliphate succeeded in annexing much of the Persian Sasanian Empire and former Roman territories in the Levant and North Africa. In 652, under Caliph Uthman, an invasion captured most of the island, but Muslims occupation was short-lived, as they left following his death.

By the end of the seventh century, with the Umayyad conquest of North Africa, the Muslims had captured the nearby port city of Carthage, allowing them to build shipyards and a permanent base from which to launch more sustained attacks.

Around 700, the island of Pantelleria was captured by Umayyads, and it was only discord among the Muslims that prevented an attempted invasion of Sicily at that time. Instead, trading agreements were arranged with the Byzantines, and Muslim merchants were allowed to trade goods at Sicilian ports.

The first true attempt at conquest was launched in 740; in that year the Muslim prince Habib, who had participated in the 728 attack, successfully captured Syracuse. Ready to conquer the whole island, they were however forced to return to Tunisia by a Berber revolt. A second attack in 752 aimed only to sack the same city.

=== Muslim conquest ===
In 826, Euphemius, the commander of the Byzantine fleet of Sicily, forced a nun to marry him. Emperor Michael II caught wind of the matter and ordered that General Constantine end the marriage and cut off Euphemius' nose. Euphemius rose up, killed Constantine and then occupied Syracuse; he in turn was defeated and driven out to North Africa. He offered rule of Sicily over to Ziyadat Allah, the Aghlabid emir of Ifriqiya (around present-day Tunisia), in return for a place as a general and safety; the Emir agreed, offering to give Euphemius the island in exchange for a yearly tribute. The conquest was entrusted to the 70-year-old qadi Asad ibn al-Furat, who led a force 10,000 infantry, 700 cavalry and 100 ships. Reinforced by the Muslims, Euphemius' ships landed at Mazara del Vallo, where the first battle against loyalist Byzantine troops occurred on July 15, 827, resulting in an Aghlabid victory.

Asad subsequently conquered the southern shore of the island and laid siege to Syracuse. After year-long siege, and an attempted mutiny, his troops were able to defeat a large army sent from Palermo, backed by a Venetian fleet led by Doge Giustiniano Participazio. A sudden outbreak of plague killed many of the Muslim troops, as well as Asad himself, forcing the Muslims to retreat to the castle Mineo. They later renewed their offensive, but failed to conquer Castrogiovanni (modern Enna) where Euphemius was killed, forcing them to retreat back to their stronghold at Mazara.

In 830, the remaining Muslims of Sicily received a strong reinforcement of 30,000 Ifriqiyan and Andalusi troops. The Iberian Muslims defeated the Byzantine commander Teodotus between July and August of that year, but again a plague forced them to return to Mazara and later Ifriqiya. However, Ifriqiyan units sent to besiege the Sicilian capital of Palermo managed to capture it after a year-long siege in September 831. Palermo was made the Muslim capital of Sicily, renamed al-Madinah ("The City"), and it became the base for further conquests on the island.

The conquest was an incremental, see-saw affair. With considerable resistance and many internal struggles, it took over a century for Byzantine Sicily to be fully conquered. Messina was besieged and captured in 842 or 843, possibly with the support of some Neapolitans, and became a base for subsequent campaigns into the Italian mainland. Syracuse was captured in 878. The conquest of the island was not fully completed until 902, when Taormina was conquered. Even after this, however, some patches of local Byzantine/Christian resistance continued until 967, after the end of the Aghlabid period.

=== Muslim rule ===
In succession, Sicily was ruled by the Sunni Aghlabid dynasty in Ifriqiya until 909, when they were overthrown and replaced by the Shiite Fatimids. The first years of Fatimid rule after 909 were difficult, as the Sicilian Muslims had already begun to acquire a distinct identity and they resisted attempts by new outsiders to assert themselves. The first Fatimid governor was expelled in 912 and the second one, Ibn Qurhub, rebelled until 916. Fatimid authority was only established more securely with the defeat of rebels and the surrender of Palermo in 917. Salim ibn Abi Rashid served as Fatimid governor from 917 to 936. He was related by marriage to the Kalbids, a high-ranking family loyal to the Fatimids. Another major revolt for independence shook the island in 937 and was only suppressed in 941.

In 948, the Fatimid caliph al-Mansur appointed the Kalbid commander al-Hasan ibn Ali al-Kalbi as governor of the island. He became the first emir of the Kalbid dynasty, which effectively ruled the island for the next century on behalf of the Fatimids. Al-Hasan returned to Ifriqiya upon the death of al-Mansur, leaving his son Ahmad as governor of the island, though he returned later to assist in campaigns against the Byzantines. Under Ahmad's tenure, Taormina was conquered again in 962 and Rometta was conquered soon after. The Fatimids subsequently conquered and moved to Egypt in 972–973, leaving the Zirids as their viceroys in Ifriqiya. It was only after this move to Egypt that the Fatimid caliphs implicitly recognized the Kalbids as hereditary rulers, who thenceforth governed the island as amirs on their behalf.

Throughout this period, Sunni Muslims formed the majority of the Muslim community in Sicily, with most (if not all) of the people of Palermo being Sunni, leading to their hostility to the Shia Kalbids. The Sunni population of the island was replenished following sectarian rebellions across north Africa from 943–947 against the Fatimids' harsh religious policies, leading to several waves of refugees fleeing to Sicily in an attempt to escape Fatimid retaliation. The Byzantines took advantage of temporary discord to occupy the eastern end of the island for several years.

Raids into Southern Italy continued under the Kalbids into the 11th century, and in 982 a joint Christian army under the Emperor Otto II and the brothers Landulf and Pandulf was defeated at Stilo near Crotone in Calabria. But Emir Abu'l-Qasim was killed in battle and with Emir Yusuf al-Kalbi (986–998) a period of steady decline began. Under Aḥmad ibn Yūsuf al-Akḥal (1017–1037) the dynastic conflict intensified, with factions within the ruling family allying themselves variously with the Byzantine Empire and the Zirids. After this period, Al-Mu'izz ibn Badis attempted to annex the island for the Zirids, while intervening in the affairs of the feuding Muslims; however, the attempt ultimately failed.

=== Decline and "Taifa" period ===
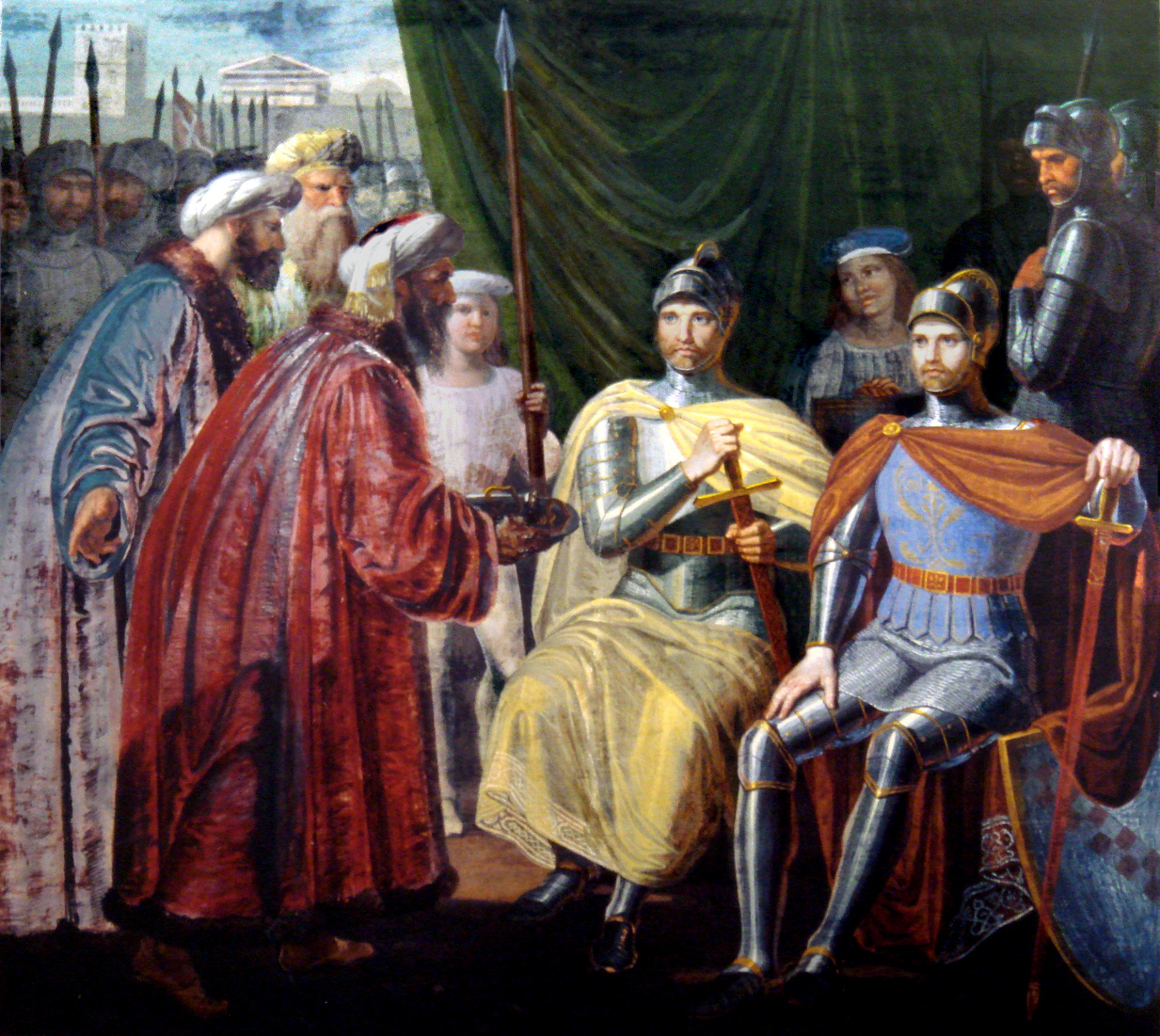
Roger I of Sicily receiving the keys of Palermo

By the 11th century, mainland southern Italian powers were hiring Norman mercenaries, who were Christian descendants of the Vikings; it was the Normans under Roger de Hauteville, who became Roger I of Sicily, that captured Sicily from the Muslims. In 1038, a Byzantine army under George Maniaces crossed the strait of Messina, and included a corps of Normans. After another decisive victory in the summer of 1040, Maniaces halted his march to lay siege to Syracuse. Despite his conquest of the latter, Maniaces was removed from his position, and the subsequent Muslim counter-offensive reconquered all the cities captured by the Byzantines. The Norman Robert Guiscard, son of Tancred, then conquered Sicily in 1060 after taking Apulia and Calabria, while his brother Roger de Hauteville occupied Messina with an army of 700 knights. Many Anglo-Danish and Varangian mercenaries fought in Southern Italy, including Harald Hardrada and William de Hauteville who conquered parts of Sicily between 1038 and 1040, and Edgar the Ætheling who fought in the Norman conquest of southern Italy. Runestones were raised in Sweden in memory of warriors who died in Langbarðaland (Land of the Lombards), the Old Norse name for southern Italy.

The Emirate of Sicily began to fragment amid intra-dynastic quarrels. In 1044, under emir Al-Ḥasan al-Ṣāmṣām, the island devolved into four qadits, or small fiefdoms: Trapani, Marsala, Mazara and Sciacca led by Abdallah ibn Mankut; that of Agrigento, Castrogiovanni and Castronuovo under Ibn al-Hawwas; Catania held by Ibn al-Maklati; and that of Syracuse under Ibn al-Thumna, while al-Samsam retained control of Palermo longer, before it adopted self-rule under a council of sheikhs. There followed a period of squabbles among the qadits that likely represented kin-groups jockeying for power. Ibn al-Thumna killed Ibn al-Maklati, took Catania and married the dead qadi's widow who was the sister of Ibn al-Hawwàs. He also took ibn Mankut's qadit, but when his wife was prevented from returning from a visit to her brother, the Fatimid-allied Ibn al-Thumna attacked Ibn al-Hawwas only to be defeated. When he left Sicily to recruit more troops, this briefly left Ibn al-Hawwas in control of most of the island. In waging his war on his rivals, Ibn al-Thumna had collaborated closely with the Normans, each using the other to further their goal of ruling the entire island, and though Ibn al-Thumna's death in a 1062 ambush led the Normans to draw back and consolidate, Ibn al-Thumna's former allies appear to have continued the alliance, such that Muslim troops constituted the majority of the Hauteville "Norman" army in Sicily.

The Zirids of North Africa sent an army to Sicily led by Ali and Ayyub ibn Tamin, and these troops progressively brought the qadits under their control, killing al-Hawwàs and effectively making Ayyub emir of Muslim Sicily. However, they lost two decisive battles against the Normans. The Sicilians and North Africans were defeated in 1063 by a small Norman force at the Battle of Cerami, cementing Norman control over the north-east of the island. The sizeable Christian population rose up against the ruling Muslims. Then in 1068, Roger and his men defeated Ayyub at the Battle of Misilmeri, and the Zirids returned to North Africa, leaving Sicily in disarray. Catania fell to the Normans in 1071. Palermo, ruled since the Zirid withdrawal by Ibn al-Ba'ba, a man apparently of Spanish Jewish descent from the city's merchant class who led the city with the support of its sheikhs, would in turn fall on 10 January 1072 after a five-month siege. Trapani capitulated the same year.

The loss of the main port cities dealt a severe blow to Muslim power on the island. The last pocket of active resistance was Syracuse governed by Ibn Abbad (known as Benavert in western chronicles). He defeated Jordan, son of Roger of Sicily in 1075, occupied Catania again in 1081, and raided Calabria shortly after. However, Roger besieged Syracuse in 1086, and Ibn Abbad tried to break the siege with a naval battle, in which he died accidentally. Syracuse surrendered after this defeat. His wife and son fled to Noto and Butera. Meanwhile, the city of Qas'r Ianni (Castrogiovanni, modern Enna) was ruled by a Hammud, who surrendered and converted to Christianity only in 1087. After his conversion, Hammud subsequently became part of the Christian nobility and retired with his family to an estate in Calabria provided by Roger I. In 1091, Butera and Noto in the southern tip of Sicily and the island of Malta, the last Arab strongholds, fell to the Christians with ease. After the conquest of Sicily, the Normans removed the local emir, Yusuf Ibn Abdallah from power, while respecting the customs of the resident Arabs. Several Anglo-Danish and Norwegian nobles participated in the Norman conquest of southern Italy, like Edgar the Ætheling, who left England in 1086, and Jarl Erling Skakke, who won his nickname ("Skakke", meaning bent head) after a battle against Arabs in Sicily.

== Society ==
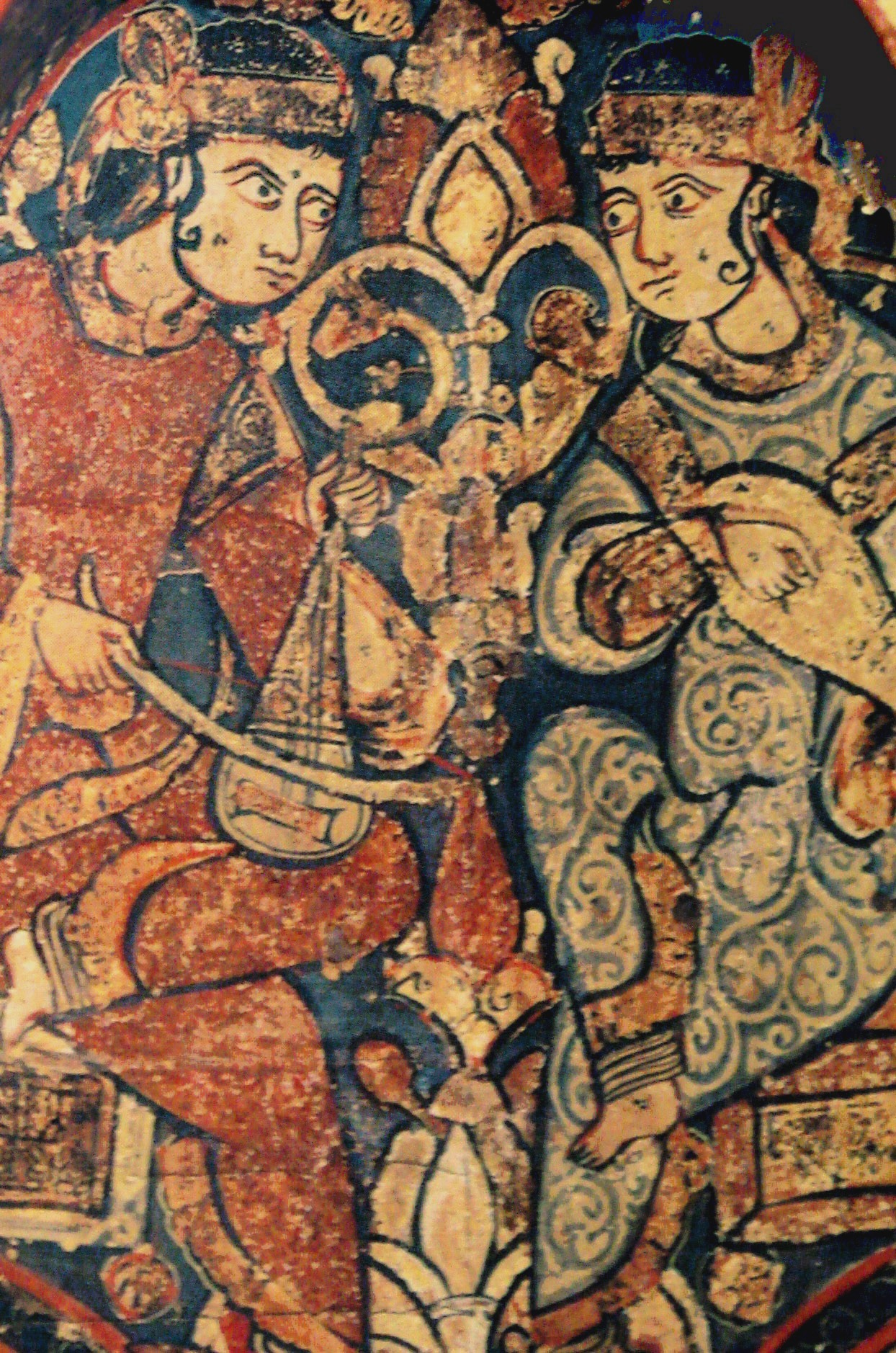
Arab musicians in Palermo

The new Arab rulers initiated land reforms, which in turn increased productivity and encouraged the growth of smallholdings, a dent to the dominance of the landed estates. The Arabs further improved irrigation systems through Qanats and introduced new and lucrative crops, including oranges, lemons, pistachio and sugarcane. A description of Palermo was given by Ibn Hawqal, a Baghdad merchant who visited Sicily in 950. A walled suburb called the Kasr (the palace) is the center of Palermo until today, with the great Friday Mosque on the site of the later Roman cathedral. The suburb of Al-Khalisa (Kalsa) contained the Sultan's palace, baths, a mosque, government offices, and a private prison. Ibn Hawqual reckoned 7,000 individual butchers trading in 150 shops. The population of the city during this period is uncertain, as figures given by Arab writers during the era were unreliable. Paul Bairoch estimated Palermo's population at 350,000 in the 11th century, while other historians like Stephan R. Epstein estimated it to be closer to 60,000. Based on al-Maqdisi's statement that Palermo was larger than Old Cairo, Kenneth Meyer Setton put the figure above 100,000 but below 250,000. Around 1330, Palermo's population stood at 51,000.

Arab traveler, geographer, and poet Ibn Jubair visited the area in the end of the 12th century and described Al-Kasr and Al-Khalisa (Kalsa):

The capital is endowed with two gifts, splendor and wealth. It contains all the real and imagined beauty that anyone could wish. Splendor and grace adorn the piazzas and the countryside; the streets and highways are wide, and the eye is dazzled by the beauty of its situation. It is a city full of marvels, with buildings similar to those of Córdoba, built of limestone. A permanent stream of water from four springs runs through the city. There are so many mosques that they are impossible to count. Most of them also serve as schools. The eye is dazzled by all this splendor.

Throughout this reign, revolts by Byzantine Sicilians occurred, especially in the east, and part of the lands were even re-occupied before being quashed.

The local population conquered by the Muslims were Greek-speaking and Latin-speaking Byzantine Christians, (Note: Mendola, Louis; et al. (2014). The Peoples of Sicily: A Multicultural Legacy. Trinacria Editions. p. 168. ISBN 978-0-6157-9694-9.: Until the arrival of the Arabs, the most widely spoken language in Sicily was a medieval dialect of Greek. Under the Arabs, Sicily became a polyglot community; some localities were more Greek-speaking while others were predominantly Arabic-speaking." pages 141–142 "Mosques were constructed, often with the help of Byzantine craftsmen, and in Sicily the Church, formally under the Patriarchate of Constantinople from 732, remained solidly Greek Orthodox into the early years of Norman rule, when the beginnings of Latinization took place.) but there were also a significant number of Jews. The Orthodox and Catholic populations were members of one Church until the events of 1054 began to separate them, the sack of 1204 being the last straw as far as the Byzantine "Orthodox" were concerned.

Christians and Jews were tolerated under Muslim rule as dhimmis but were subject to some restrictions; they were also required to pay the jizya, or head tax, and the kharaj or land tax. Under Arab rule there were different categories of Jizya payers, but their common denominator was the payment of the Jizya as a mark of subjection to Muslim rule in exchange for protection against foreign and internal aggression. The conquered population could avoid this subservient status by converting to Islam. About half the population was Muslim at the time of the Norman Conquest. The co-existence with the conquered population fell apart after the reconquest of Sicily starting in the 1160s and particularly following the death of King William II of Sicily in 1189.

== Government ==
Seated in what is now the Royal Palace in Palermo, the emir held authority over most affairs of state, including the army, administration, justice, and the treasury. He appointed the governors of major cities, high ranking judges (qāḍī), and arbitrators for minor disputes between individuals (hakam). An assembly of notables called giamà'a played a consultative role, albeit sometimes making important decisions in lieu of the emir. It is also very likely that the authorities operated a tiraz, an official workshop that produced valuable fabrics such as silk, which were granted as a sign of appreciation to their subject or as a gift to foreign dignitaries.

Muslim sovereignty was never absolute across the island, and the creation of three subdivisions served to distinguish different approaches to government. Under the Arab rule the island was divided in three administrative regions, or "vals", roughly corresponding to the three "points" of Sicily: Val di Mazara in the west; Val Demone in the northeast; and Val di Noto in the southeast. Western Sicily was more Islamized and heavily populated by Arabs, allowing for full and direct administration; by contrast, the northeast region of Val Demone remained majority Christian and often resistant to Muslim rule, prompting a focus on tax collection and maintaining public order, as a result, revolts by Byzantine Sicilians continuously occurred in the east where Greek-speaking Christians predominated. Parts of the island were re-occupied before revolts were quashed. By the 11th century, the Emirate of Sicily began to fragment as intra-dynastic quarreling fractured the Muslim government.

The fighters or junud in conquering the lands obtained four-fifths as booty (fai) and one fifth was reserved for the state or the local governor (the khums), following the rules of Islamic law. However, this rule was not always respected and in many areas such as that of Agrigento the new owners would not have had the right. But it must be said that this distribution of the lands brought about the end of the large estates and the possibility of better exploitation of the lands. New crops were thus introduced where only wheat had been grown for centuries. Sugarcane, vegetables, citrus fruits, dates and mulberry trees appeared and mining exploitation began.

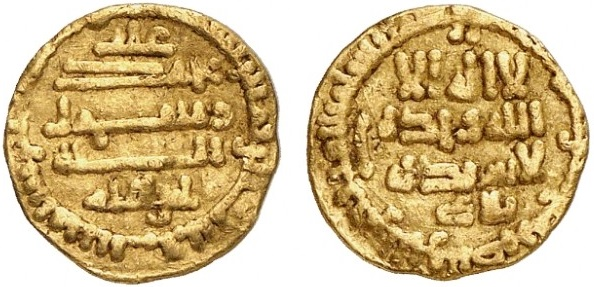
Aghlabid quarter dinar minted in Sicily, 879

=== Coinage ===
The coin introduced by the Arabs was the dinar, in gold and weighing 4.25 grams. The dirhem was silver and weighed 2.97 grams. The Aghlabites introduced the solidus in gold and the follis in copper. While following the conquest of Palermo in 886 the kharruba was coined which was worth 1/6 of a dirhem.

== Aftermath ==
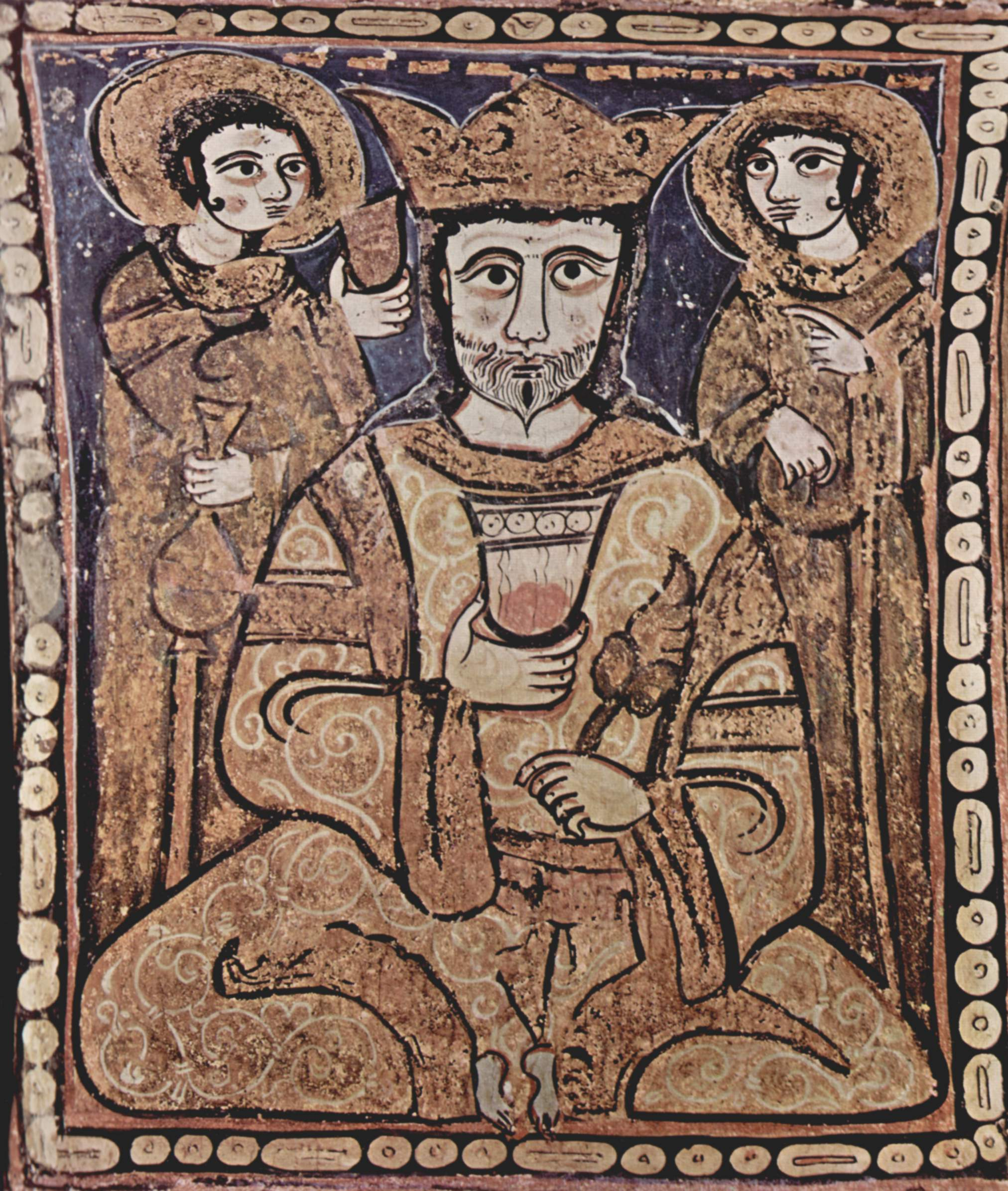
Depiction of Norman ruler in the Capella Palatina in Palermo (12th century)

The Norman Kingdom of Sicily under Roger II has been characterized as "multi-ethnic in nature and religiously tolerant". Normans, Jews, Muslim Arabs, Byzantine Greeks, Lombards and native Sicilians lived in relative harmony. Arabic remained a language of government and administration for at least a century into Norman rule, and traces remain in the language of Sicily and evidently more in the language of Malta today. The island’s Muslim populations, largely made up of Arabs, Berbers, and native converts to Islam, also maintained their domination of industry, retailing, and production, while Muslim craftsmanship, masonry, and expertise in government and administration were highly sought after.

However, the island's Muslims were faced with the choice of voluntary departure or subjection to Christian rule. The Muslims who could leave, apparently did so, seeking refuge in North Africa. The rest were forced to live under Christian overlordship, but they lived confined in an inner territory of western Sicily, in the area ranging from Palermo to Agrigento. Some Muslims chose to feign conversion and even adopted Greek Christian names, but such a remedy could only provide individual protection and could not sustain a community. The new Roman Catholic monarchs gradually replaced Orthodox clergy with Latin clerics. The Normans also followed a policy of steady Latinization by bringing in hundreds of thousands of Lombard immigrants from mainland Italy and France. Before them, other Lombards arrived in Sicily, with an expedition departed in 1038, led by the Byzantine commander George Maniakes, which for a very short time managed to snatch Messina and Syracuse from Arab rule. The Lombards who arrived with the Byzantines settled in Maniace, Randazzo and Troina, while a group of Genoese and other Lombards from Liguria settled in Caltagirone. After the marriage between the Norman Roger I of Sicily and Adelaide del Vasto, descendant of the Aleramici family, many Northern Italian colonisers (known collectively as Lombards) left their homeland, in the Aleramici's possessions in Piedmont and Liguria (then known as Lombardy), to settle on the island of Sicily. (Note: These Lombard colonisers were natives from Northern Italy and should not be confused with the Lombard Germanic tribe, who were referred to as Longobardi to distinguish them from the locals of the region who were known as Lombardi.)

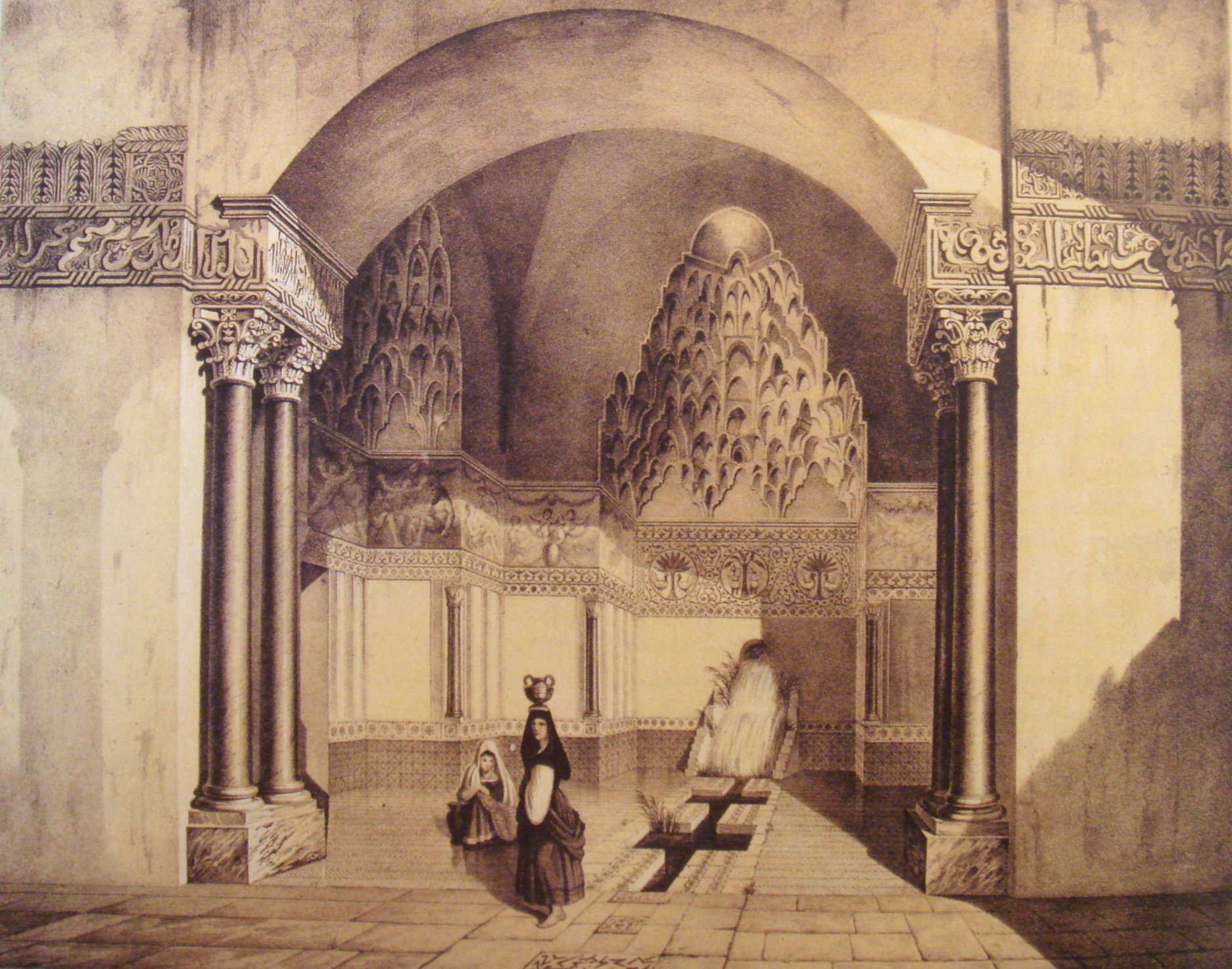
Arab-Norman art and architecture combined European and Classical features with Islamic architectural features such as muqarnas

Lombard pogroms against Muslims started in the 1160s. Muslim and Christian communities in Sicily became increasingly geographically separated. The island's Muslim communities were mainly isolated beyond an internal frontier that divided the south and western half of the island from the Christian north and eastern half; in particular, the northeast region of Val Demone had remained predominantly Byzantine Greek and Christian, even during Islamic rule. (Note: Loud, G. A. (2007). The Latin Church in Norman Italy. Cambridge University Press. p. 494. ISBN 978-0-521-25551-6.: At the end of the twelfth century ... While in Apulia Greeks were in a majority–and indeed present in any numbers at all–only in the Salento peninsula in the extreme south, at the time of the conquest they had an overwhelming preponderance in Lucania and central and southern Calabria, as well as comprising anything up to a third of the population of Sicily, concentrated especially in the north-east of the island, the Val Demone.) As a subject people, Sicilian Muslims became dependent on the mercy of their Christian masters and, ultimately, on royal protection. After King William the Good died in 1189, royal protection was lifted, and the door was opened for widespread attacks against the island's Muslims. This destroyed any lingering hope of coexistence, however unequal the respective populations might have been. The death of Henry VI and his wife Constance a year later plunged Sicily into political turmoil. With the loss of royal protection and with Frederick II still an infant in papal custody, Sicily became a battleground for rival German and papal forces. The island's Muslim rebels sided with German warlords like Markward von Anweiler. In response, Pope Innocent III declared a crusade against Markward, alleging that he had made an unholy alliance with the Saracens of Sicily. Nevertheless, in 1206 Innocent III had attempted to convince Muslim leaders to remain loyal. By this time, the Muslim rebellion was in full swing. They were in control of Jato, Entella, Platani, Celso, Calatrasi, Corleone (taken in 1208), Guastanella and Cinisi. Muslim revolt extended throughout a whole stretch of western Sicily. The rebels were led by Muhammad Ibn Abbād. He called himself the "prince of believers", struck his own coins, and attempted to find Muslim support from other parts of the Muslim world.

However, Frederick II, no longer a child, responded by launching a series of military campaigns against the Muslim rebels in 1221. The Hohenstaufen forces rooted out the defenders of Jato, Entella, and the other fortresses. Rather than exterminate the Muslims. who numbered about 60,000, in 1223, Frederick II began deporting them to Lucera in Apulia, where many were enslaved to farm lands and perform domestic labor. A year later, expeditions were sent against Malta and Djerba, to establish royal control and prevent their Muslim populations from helping the rebels. Saracen archers from Lucera were forced to serve in Sicilian armies and the presence of Muslim contingents in the imperial army remained a reality even under Manfred and Conradin.

As a result of the Arab expulsion, many towns across Sicily were left depopulated. By the 12th century, Swabian kings and their successors (Capetian House of Anjou and Aragonese House of Barcelona) granted immigrants from northern Italy (particularly Piedmont, Lombardy and Liguria), Latium and Tuscany in central Italy, and French regions of Normandy, Provence and Brittany (all collectively known as Lombards.) settlement into Sicily, re-establishing the Latin element into the island, a legacy which can be seen in the many Gallo-Italic dialects and towns found in the interior and western parts of Sicily, brought by these settlers. This social process laid the groundwork for the introduction of Latin (as opposed to Byzantine) Catholicism. The process of Latinization was fostered largely by the Roman Church and its liturgy. The removal of Islam in Sicily was completed by the late 1240s, when the final deportations to Lucera took place.

During the subsequent rule of the Aragonese and Spanish crowns in Sicily, the Spanish inquisition was introduced on the island to remove from Sicily its remaining Muslim population. The attacks were aimed primarily at Muslim slaves captured during raids on ships and on the coastal cities of the Barbary Coast and the Ottoman Empire during the 16th and 17th centuries.

== List of rulers ==
=== Aghlabid governors ===
- Muhammad ibn al-Fadl (882–885, 892)

=== Kalbids ===
- al-Hasan al-Kalbi (948–953)
- Ahmad ibn al-Hasan al-Kalbi (954–969)
- Ya'ish (969–970), usurper
- Abu'l-Qasim Ali ibn al-Hasan al-Kalbi (970–982)
- Jābir al-Kalbī (982–983)
- Jaʿfar al-Kalbī (983–985)
- ʿAbd Allāh al-Kalbī (985–990)
- Yusuf al-Kalbi (990–998)
- Ja'far al-Kalbi II (998–1019)
- Aḥmad ibn Yūsuf al-Akḥal (1019–1037)
- Abd Allah ibn al-Mu'izz (1037–1040)
- Al-Ḥasan al-Ṣāmṣām (1040–1053)

=== Taifa period ===
- Abdallah ibn Mankut – Trapani and Mazara (1053–?)
- Ibn al-Maklatí – Catania (1053–?)
- Muhammed ibn Ibrahim (Ibn ath-Thumnah) – Syracuse (1053–1062) and in later years Catania and Trapani/Mazara
- Alí ibn Nima (Ibn al-Hawwās) – Agrigento and Castrogiovanni (1053–about 1065), all Taifas from 1062
- Ayyub ibn Tamim (Zirid) (about 1065–1068)
- Ibn al-Ba'ba, Palermo (1068–1072)
- Hammad – Agrigento and Castrogiovanni (1068–1087)
- Ibn Abbad (Benavert) – Syracuse and Catania (1071–1086)

== See also ==
- Emirate of Bari
- History of Islam in southern Italy
- History of Sicily
