= Barjawan =

10th-century politician

Abū'l-Futūh, or Abū'l-Fatḥ Barjawān al-Ustādh (عَبْدُ الْفُتُوحِ بَرْجَوَانِ الْأُسْتَاذِ; died 25/26 March 1000) was a eunuch palace official who became the prime minister (wāsiṭa) and de facto regent of the Shia Fatimid Caliphate in October 997, and held the position until his assassination. Of obscure origin, Barjawan became the tutor of heir-apparent al-Hakim bi-Amr Allah, who became caliph in 996 with the death of al-Aziz Billah. On al-Hakim's coronation, power was seized by the Kutama Berbers, who tried to monopolize government and clashed with their rivals, the Turkic slave-soldiers. Allied with disaffected Berber leaders, Barjawan was able to seize the reins of government for himself in 997. His tenure was marked by a successful balancing act between the Berbers and the Turks, as well as the rise of men of diverse backgrounds, promoted under his patronage. Militarily, Barjawan was successful in restoring order to the Fatimids' restive Levantine and Libyan provinces, and set the stage for an enduring truce with the Byzantine Empire. The concentration of power in his hands and his overbearing attitude alienated al-Hakim, however, who ordered him assassinated and thereafter assumed the governance of the caliphate himself.

== Biography ==
=== Origin and rise to power ===
Barjawan's origin is obscure: in his biographical dictionary, Ibn Khallikan records him as a Black African (aswad al-lawn), whereas the historians Ibn al-Qalanisi and al-Maqrizi assert that he was white (abyaḍ al-lawn), with al-Maqrizi further specifying that he was either a Sicilian (Siqillī) or a Slav (Saqlabī), as both versions appear in the manuscripts of his work. A eunuch, he was brought up as a slave in the court of Caliph al-Aziz Billah (r. 975–996), under whom he became court intendant. Already before the death of al-Aziz, Barjawan was appointed tutor of the Caliph's son and heir Mansur, the future al-Hakim bi-Amr Allah, whence he is also mentioned with the title of ustādh, "master", often borne by eunuch preceptors of princes. In 996, Barjawan accompanied his charge to Bilbays, where al-Aziz, in the midst of preparing an expedition against the Byzantine Empire, had fallen ill and was approaching death. According to the chroniclers, upon al-Aziz's death, Barjawan rushed to find his pupil. Finding him playing in a tree, he placed a jewelled turban on his head, and kissed the ground before him while saluting him as "Commander of the Faithful".

After al-Aziz died, the Kutama Berbers, Shia Muslim soldiers who had traditionally provided the mainstay of the Fatimid armies but had begun to be eclipsed by other groups—chiefly the Turkish and Daylamite mercenaries from the Islamic East or Mashāriqa ("Easterners")—used the opportunity presented by the accession of the underage al-Hakim to demand they be given control of the government. Al-Aziz's Christian vizier Isa ibn Nasturus was dismissed (and executed shortly after) and replaced by the veteran commander al-Hasan ibn Ammar, with the title of wāsiṭa ("intermediary") rather than full vizier (wazīr).

Ibn Ammar immediately began staffing the government with Shia Berbers, who engaged in a virtual pillaging of the state coffers. The Berbers' attempts to exclude the other interest groups from power—not only the Turkic and the other many ethnic contingents of the army, but also the civilian bureaucracy, whose salary was cut—alienated not only the Mashāriqa, but alarmed Barjawan, who furthermore nurtured ambitions of his own. Barjawan contacted the Fatimid governor of Damascus, the Turk Manjutakin, and invited him to march onto Egypt and depose Ibn Ammar. Manjutakin accepted, but was defeated by Ibn Ammar's troops under Sulayman ibn Ja'far ibn Falah at Ascalon and taken prisoner. Barjawan however soon found a new ally, in the person of the Kutama leader Jaysh ibn al-Samsama, governor of Tripoli, whom Ibn Falah dismissed and replaced with his own brother. Jaysh and Barjawan gathered a following of other dissatisfied Berber leaders, and launched an uprising in Cairo. Ibn Ammar was forced to flee, and Barjawan replaced him as wāsiṭa on 4 October 997.

=== Government of Egypt and death ===
During his ascendancy, Barjawan tried to balance the two factions and restore the equilibrium that had existed under al-Aziz. Thus he reversed the blatant partisanship of Ibn Ammar and fulfilled the demands of the Mashāriqa for positions and patronage, while taking care to placate the Kutama as well. In this vein, he pardoned Ibn Ammar and restored him his monthly salary of 500 gold dinars, and appointed Jaysh ibn al-Samsama to the governorship of Damascus. Nevertheless, his rise to power marked the definitive decline of Kutama power in the Fatimid state. At the same time, Barjawan chose fellow palace eunuchs to fill many of the highest positions in the capital and the provinces, and created a considerable network of patronage by promoting people from various origins to office. As his chief administrator, he selected a Christian, Fahd ibn Ibrahim.

At the time of Barjawan's rise to power, the Levantine provinces were in a state of unrest. Tyre had risen in revolt under the sailor Allaqa, the Bedouin chieftain Mufarrij ibn Daghfal ibn al-Jarrah tried to capture Ramlah, and there was an ongoing conflict with the Byzantine Empire over control of the Hamdanid emirate of Aleppo in northern Syria. Led by Jaysh ibn al-Samsama, the Fatimids were successful in suppressing the rebellion at Tyre in June 998, although the inhabitants had called upon the Byzantine fleet for help, and subduing Mufarrij and his Bedouin. Jaysh then marched to the relief of Apamea, which was being besieged by the Byzantine doux of Antioch, Damian Dalassenos. In the ensuing battle, the Fatimids secured a major victory, and Dalassenos fell. Dalassenos' defeat forced Emperor Basil II to personally lead a campaign to Syria the following year, pillaging the region of Homs, Beirut, and Tripoli, although he failed to capture the latter. Both empires were not interested in pursuing warfare in the region further, however, and through the mediation of the Patriarch of Jerusalem, a truce was concluded in 1001 that confirmed the status quo and ushered a long period of peaceful, if not always untroubled, relations between the two major powers of the Eastern Mediterranean. Bajarwan was also successful in quelling unrest in Barqa and restoring Fatimid control over Tripoli (in modern Libya). Barjawan installed eunuch governors over both cities, but the capture of Tripoli proved short-lived and had unintended consequences, as the Fatimid troops confronted the Sanhaja Berbers over its control. This strained relations with the Zirids, who had been entrusted with the Fatimids' old heartland of Ifriqiya and the Maghreb when the caliphs moved to Egypt, and contributed to the Zirids' gradual drift away from the Fatimid allegiance.

Barjawan made the mistake of continuing to think of al-Hakim as his pupil, treating him in a high-handed manner and even daring to restrict his riding and the gifts he distributed. The troubled relationship was not helped when al-Hakim, as al-Nuwayri reports, learned that Barjawan referred to him as "the lizard". As a result, al-Hakim developed a fierce hatred of his over-powerful minister, encouraged by another court eunuch, Abu'l-Fadl Raydan al-Saqlabi, who pointed out the danger of Barjawan becoming a second Kafur, the slave who had become the de facto ruler of Ikhshidid Egypt after the death of the dynasty's founder, Muhammad ibn Tughj al-Ikhshid. Thus on the night of 16/17 Rabi' II 390 AH (25 March 1000 in the Gregorian calendar), Raydan stabbed Barjawan in the belly with a knife at al-Hakim's orders. The murder provoked unease among the elites and the populace alike, who feared that the equilibrium established by Barjawan would be upset. Al-Hakim however was able to quiet their fears and consolidate his authority by appearing before the armed crowds above the gates of the palace, justifying his action as being well within his rights as caliph and denouncing Barjawan as plotting against him, while appealing to the people to assist him in his youth and inexperience. Al-Hakim now assumed the reins of government himself, although he took care to ensure continuity by keeping on Fahd ibn Ibrahim as head of the bureaucracy. Nevertheless, throughout his reign, the Caliph sought to limit the power of his viziers, and changed them frequently; he furthermore did not hesitate to launch purges of the high officialdom, to which several important officials fell victim. As Farhad Daftary writes, Barjawan was merely the first in a "long list of wazīrs, wāsiṭas, commanders and other dignitaries" who lost their lives at al-Hakim's orders.

Barjawan was known as "a man of taste and a lover of the pleasures of this world" (B. Lewis)—on his death, according to Ibn Khallikan, his wardrobe "contained one thousand Dabiq trousers, one thousand silk tikkas [waistbands], and an immense quantity of clothes, furniture, musical instruments, books and curiosities". He was a patron of musicians and poets, who frequented his home. A street in Cairo was named after him and still bore it in the 13th century.

== Sources ==
- Brett, Michael (2001). The Rise of the Fatimids: The World of the Mediterranean and the Middle East in the Fourth Century of the Hijra, Tenth Century CE. The Medieval Mediterranean. Vol. 30. Leiden: Brill. ISBN 9004117415.
- Canard, Marius (1961). "Les sources arabes de l'histoire byzantine aux confins des Xe et XIe siècles". Revue des études byzantines. 19: 284–314. doi:10.3406/rebyz.1961.1264.
- Daftary, Farhad (1990). The Ismāʿı̄lı̄s: Their History and Doctrines (First ed.). Cambridge: Cambridge University Press. ISBN 978-0-521-37019-6.
- Kennedy, Hugh (2004) [1986]. The Prophet and the Age of the Caliphates: The Islamic Near East from the 6th to the 11th Century (Second ed.). Harlow: Longman. ISBN 978-0-582-40525-7.
- Lev, Yaacov (1991). State and Society in Fatimid Egypt. Leiden: Brill. ISBN 9789004093447.
- Lewis, B. (1960). "Bardjawān". In Gibb, H. A. R.; Kramers, J. H.; Lévi-Provençal, E.; Schacht, J.; Lewis, B. & Pellat, Ch. (eds.). The Encyclopaedia of Islam, Second Edition. Volume I: A–B. Leiden: E. J. Brill. pp. 1041–1042. OCLC 495469456.
- McGuckin de Slane, William, ed. (1843). Ibn Khallikan's Biographical Dictionary, translated from the Arabic by Bn. William McGuckin de Slane, Vol. I. Paris: Oriental translation fund of Great Britain and Ireland.

Preceded by al-Hasan ibn Ammar	wāsiṭa of the Fatimid Caliphate; October 997 – 25 March 1000	Succeeded by al-Husayn ibn Jawhar
