= Niketas Abalantes =

Start of Niketas's copy of Basil's homily on the Nativity

Niketas, possibly surnamed Abalantes (Greek: Νικήτας [Αβαλάντης]), was a Byzantine military commander who in 964 led a major expedition against the Fatimid Caliphate in Sicily, was defeated, and spent a few years in captivity, where he copied the Codex Parisinus gr. 497 manuscript.

== Life ==
=== Family ===
His family name is uncertain: the only surviving source, in the Codex Parisinus gr. 497, has the fragmentary genitive form ...άντου. It was the historian Helene Ahrweiler who glossed the name to Abalantes, but the accuracy of the emendation is not certain. His brother, Michael, was a patrikios and protovestiarios (head chamberlain) of Emperor Nikephoros II Phokas (r. 963–969).

=== Expedition to Sicily ===
According to the contemporary historian Leo the Deacon, Niketas was a eunuch, but also a pious and god-fearing man. He was named protospatharios and droungarios of the Fleet (commander-in-chief of the central Imperial Fleet), and eventually promoted to patrikios as well. In 964, Emperor Nikephoros II chose him to lead a large-scale expedition to Sicily, where during the previous two years the Fatimids' Kalbid governors had begun reducing the remaining Byzantine strongholds in the Val Demone, capturing Taormina and laying siege to Rometta. Niketas was the commander of the fleet and overall commander-in-chief, while the land forces were led by the Emperor's nephew, Manuel Phokas.

According to Leo the Deacon, upon arriving in Sicily, the Byzantines were able to capture Syracuse and Himera, while Taormina and Leontini surrendered without resistance. Encouraged by this success, the army under Manuel Phokas advanced heedlessly into the interior to relieve Rometta, but was ambushed in October 964 and destroyed by the Fatimid troops. Rometta then capitulated, and the Fatimids proceeded to attack the Byzantine fleet in the Straits of Messina: in the so-called "Battle of the Straits", the Fatimid commander, Ahmad ibn al-Hasan al-Kalbi, scored a major victory, capturing many ships and taking Niketas captive.

=== Captivity and release ===
Niketas and other Byzantine commanders were brought to Ifriqiya, where they were handed over to the Fatimid caliph al-Mu'izz. They remained in captivity, until ransomed by Nikephoros II, probably as part of the peace treaty concluded in 967. Leo the Deacon claims that the Emperor offered a sword that had belonged to Muhammad as ransom for Niketas, and threatened war otherwise.

During his captivity in Ifriqiya, Niketas copied the homilies of Basil the Great and Gregory of Nazianzus in a fine calligraphic manuscript, which he donated to a monastery dedicated to St. George in 970, and which is now in the Bibliothèque nationale de France in Paris (Parisinus gr. 947).

== Sources ==
- Ahrweiler, Hélène (1965). "L'histoire et la géographie de la région de Smyrne entre les deux occupations turques (1081-1317), particulièrement au XIIIe siècle". Travaux et mémoires. 1. Paris: E. de Boccard: 2–178.
- Halm, Heinz (1996). The Empire of the Mahdi: The Rise of the Fatimids. Handbook of Oriental Studies. Vol. 26. Translated by Michael Bonner. Leiden: BRILL. ISBN 9004100563.
- Lilie, Ralph-Johannes; Ludwig, Claudia; Pratsch, Thomas; Zielke, Beate (2013). Prosopographie der mittelbyzantinischen Zeit Online. Berlin-Brandenburgische Akademie der Wissenschaften. Nach Vorarbeiten F. Winkelmanns erstellt (in German). Berlin and Boston: De Gruyter.
