= Battle of the Straits =

965 battle

- Part of the Arab–Byzantine wars
- Map of the Arab–Byzantine naval conflict in the Mediterranean, 7th–11th centuries
Date	Early 965
Location	Straits of Messina, Italy
Result	Fatimid victory

Belligerents
Byzantine Empire	Fatimid Caliphate; Kalbid Emirate of Sicily

Commanders and leaders
Niketas Abalantes (POW)	Ahmad ibn al-Hasan al-Kalbi

Casualties and losses
Heavy, c. 1,000 prisoners	Unknown

The Battle of the Straits (Arabic: waqʿat al-majāz) was fought in early 965 between the fleets of the Byzantine Empire and the Fatimid Caliphate in the Straits of Messina. It resulted in a major Fatimid victory, and the final collapse of the attempt of Emperor Nikephoros II Phokas to recover Sicily from the Fatimids.

== Background ==
The fall of Taormina to the Aghlabids in 902 marked the effective end of the Muslim conquest of Sicily, but the Byzantines retained a few outposts on the island, and Taormina itself threw off Muslim control soon after. In 909, the Fatimids took over the Aghlabid metropolitan province of Ifriqiya, and with it Sicily. The Fatimids (and after the 950s the Kalbid hereditary governors of Sicily) continued the tradition of jihad, both against the remaining Christian strongholds in the northeast of Sicily and, more prominently, against the Byzantine possessions in southern Italy, punctuated by temporary truces.

Following the Byzantine reconquest of Crete in 960–961, where the Fatimids, constrained by a truce with the Empire and the distances involved, were unable or unwilling to interfere, the Fatimids turned their attention to Sicily, where they decided to reduce the remaining Byzantine outposts: Taormina, the forts in the Val Demone and Val di Noto, and Rometta. Taormina fell to the governor Ahmad ibn al-Hasan al-Kalbi on Christmas Day 962, after more than nine months of siege, and in the next year his cousin, al-Hasan ibn Ammar al-Kalbi, laid siege to Rometta. The garrison of the latter sent for aid to Emperor Nikephoros II Phokas, who prepared a major expedition, led by the patrikios Niketas Abalantes and his own nephew, Manuel Phokas.

== Battle of the Straits ==
The Byzantine force landed in October 964 and quickly captured Messina and other forts in the Val Demone, but its attempt to relieve Rometta was decisively defeated, with Manuel Phokas among the dead. Left without hope of relief, Rometta fell in spring 965.

Following their defeat before Rometta, the remaining Byzantine forces were forced to withdraw to Messina. Niketas with the Byzantine fleet tried to cross over the Straits of Messina from the Italian mainland, but he was intercepted by the Fatimid fleet under Ahmad al-Kalbi. In the ensuing battle, known in the Arabic sources (Ibn al-Athir, al-Maqrizi, Abu'l-Fida) as the "Battle of the Straits" (waq‘at al-majāz), the Fatimid governor employed divers equipped to attack the Byzantine ships: in the description of Heinz Halm, "they would dive from their own ship and swim over to the enemy ship; they would fasten ropes to its rudder, along which earthenware pots containing Greek fire were then made to slide over to the enemy ship, and shattered on the sternpost". This tactic succeeded in destroying many Byzantine vessels, and the battle ended in a major Fatimid victory; according to the Arab historians, a thousand prisoners were taken, including the Byzantine admiral, Niketas, with many of his officers, as well as a heavy Indian sword which bore an inscription indicating that it had once belonged to Muhammad.

== Aftermath ==
This defeat led the Byzantines to once more request a truce in 966/7, resulting in a peace treaty leaving Sicily in Fatimid hands, and renewing the Byzantine obligation to pay tribute in exchange for the cessation of raids in Calabria. Both powers were willing to come to terms, as both were occupied elsewhere: Phokas with his wars against the Hamdanids and the conquest of Cilicia, and the Fatimids with their planned invasion of Egypt. The caliph al-Mu'izz li-Din Allah refortified a number of towns in Sicily during this time, and built Friday mosques and settled Muslims in hitherto Christian-dominated towns in the Val Demone. Taormina, however, was razed, perhaps as part of the terms of the peace treaty, and not resettled until 976.

As part of the peace treaty, the Byzantine captives, including Niketas, were ransomed by the Empire. Niketas had spent his captivity in Ifriqiya copying the homilies of Basil of Caesarea and Gregory of Nazianzus in a fine calligraphic manuscript, which after his release he donated to a monastery, and which is now in the Bibliothèque nationale de France in Paris (Par. gr. 947).

== Sources ==
- Brett, Michael (2001). The Rise of the Fatimids: The World of the Mediterranean and the Middle East in the Fourth Century of the Hijra, Tenth Century CE. The Medieval Mediterranean. Vol. 30. Leiden: BRILL. ISBN 9004117415.
- Halm, Heinz (1996). The Empire of the Mahdi: The Rise of the Fatimids. Handbook of Oriental Studies. Vol. 26. Translated by Michael Bonner. Leiden and Boston: E.J. Brill. ISBN 9004100563.
- Lev, Yaacov [in Russian] (1984). "The Fāṭimid Navy, Byzantium and the Mediterranean Sea, 909–1036 CE/297–427 AH". Byzantion: Revue internationale des études byzantines. 54 (1): 220–252. ISSN 0378-2506. JSTOR 44170866.
- Lilie, Ralph-Johannes; Ludwig, Claudia; Pratsch, Thomas; Zielke, Beate (2013). Prosopographie der mittelbyzantinischen Zeit Online. Berlin-Brandenburgische Akademie der Wissenschaften. Nach Vorarbeiten F. Winkelmanns erstellt (in German). Berlin and Boston: De Gruyter.
- Metcalfe, Alex (2009). The Muslims of Medieval Italy. Edinburgh: Edinburgh University Press. ISBN 978-0-7486-2008-1.
