= Siege of Rometta =

Final battle of the Muslim conquest of Sicily (963–965)

- Part of the Arab–Byzantine wars and the Muslim conquest of Sicily
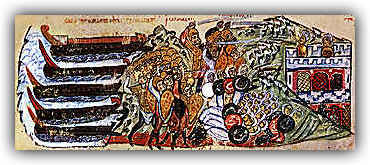
- Byzantines and Arabs clash in Sicily . Miniature by John Scilitzes.
Date	963 – May 965
Location	Rometta, Sicily
Result	Fatimid victory
Territorial changes	Rometta conquered by the Fatimids

Belligerents
Fatimid Caliphate; Emirate of Sicily; Kalbid Emirate	Byzantine Empire

Commanders and leaders
Caliph al-Mu'izz li-Din Allah; Ahmad ibn Hasan; Hasan ibn Ammar; Hasan ibn Ali	Niketas Abalantes; Manuel Phokas †

Strength
Unknown	40,000 men

Casualties and losses
Unknown	10,000 killed

The siege of Rometta was a successful siege of the Byzantine city of Rometta, in northeastern Sicily, by the Kalbids on behalf of the Fatimid Dynasty, that took place between 963 and 965 and marked the conclusion of the Muslim conquest of Sicily.

== Siege ==
The siege was led by the two Kalbid cousins al-Hasan ibn Ammar and Ahmad ibn al-Hasan al-Kalbi. In 962, Taormina was besieged and reduced by Ahmad, where the entire population was sold into slavery, and the area was colonized by Muslim resettlers. Following the fall of Taormina in 962, the Kalbids moved north to Rometta. The next year Ahmad began the siege. The city soon sent an envoy to the Byzantine emperor, Nikephoros II Phokas, requesting military aid and provisions. Nikephoros responded by equipping a fleet of around 40,000 men, many of whom were veterans from the Byzantine conquest of Crete, for battle in Sicily. The fleet was commanded by Niketas Abalantes, while the cavalry was commanded by Manuel Phokas, a nephew of Emperor Nikephoros through his brother, Leo Phokas the Younger. In October, 964, the siege was reinforced by Berber troops led by the emir of Sicily, al-Hasan ibn Ali al-Kalbi. On 25 October, the Byzantines and the Muslims engaged one another. The Byzantines were initially in control of the battle; however, the Muslims were soon able to rout them, supposedly killing more than a quarter of the force, including Phokas. The surviving Byzantines attempted to flee back to their fleet at Messina, but were ambushed upon departure in the Battle of the Straits and defeated. Without reinforcements, Rometta was unable to defend itself against the Kalbids and soon fell in May 965.

== Sources ==
- Brett, Michael (2001). The Rise of the Fatimids: The World of the Mediterranean and the Middle East in the Fourth Century of the Hijra, Tenth Century CE. The Medieval Mediterranean. Vol. 30. Leiden: BRILL. ISBN 9004117415.
- Halm, Heinz (1996). The Empire of the Mahdi: The Rise of the Fatimids. Handbook of Oriental Studies. Vol. 26. Translated by Michael Bonner. Leiden: BRILL. ISBN 9004100563.
- Kaldellis, Anthony (2017). Streams of Gold, Rivers of Blood: The Rise and Fall of Byzantium, 955 A.D. to the First Crusade. Oxford University Press. ISBN 978-0190253226.
- Lilie, Ralph-Johannes; Ludwig, Claudia; Pratsch, Thomas; Zielke, Beate (2013). Prosopographie der mittelbyzantinischen Zeit Online. Berlin-Brandenburgische Akademie der Wissenschaften. Nach Vorarbeiten F. Winkelmanns erstellt (in German). Berlin and Boston: De Gruyter.
- Metcalfe, Alex (2009). The Muslims of Medieval Italy. Edinburgh: Edinburgh University Press. ISBN 978-0-7486-2008-1.
