= Makroioannes =

The patrikios Makroioannes (Greek: Μακροϊωάννης; "long John", evidently a sobriquet) was a Byzantine naval commander who commanded the fleet in the expedition of Malakenos in 950/1 to southern Italy. The Byzantine expeditionary corps united with the local forces of the strategos of Calabria, Paschalios, but suffered a crushing defeat by the Fatimids under al-Hasan ibn Ali al-Kalbi and the eunuch Faraj Muhaddad at Gerace on 7 May 952. The Byzantine commanders themselves were nearly captured. Nothing further is known of Makroioannes.

== Sources ==
- Brett, Michael (2001). The Rise of the Fatimids: The World of the Mediterranean and the Middle East in the Fourth Century of the Hijra, Tenth Century CE. The Medieval Mediterranean. Vol. 30. Leiden: BRILL. ISBN 9004117415.
- Halm, Heinz (1996). The Empire of the Mahdi: The Rise of the Fatimids. Handbook of Oriental Studies. Vol. 26. transl. by Michael Bonner. Leiden: BRILL. ISBN 9004100563.
- Lilie, Ralph-Johannes; Ludwig, Claudia; Pratsch, Thomas; Zielke, Beate (2013). Prosopographie der mittelbyzantinischen Zeit Online. Berlin-Brandenburgische Akademie der Wissenschaften. Nach Vorarbeiten F. Winkelmanns erstellt (in German). Berlin and Boston: De Gruyter.
