= Abu'l-Qasim Ali ibn al-Hasan al-Kalbi =

10th century Islamic ruler of Sicily

- Died: 13 July 982; Capo Colonna
- Relatives: al-Hasan ibn Ali al-Kalbi (father), Ahmad ibn al-Hasan al-Kalbi (brother)
- Military career
- Allegiance: Emirate of Sicily (Fatimid Caliphate)
- Service years: 23 June 970 – 13 July 982
- Commands: Emir of Sicily

Abu'l-Qasim Ali ibn al-Hasan al-Kalbi (Arabic: أبو القاسم علي بن الحسن الكلبي, romanized: Abū al-Qāsim ʿAlī ibn al-Ḥasan al-Kalbī), known to the Byzantine Greeks as Bolkasimos (Βολκάσιμος), was the third Emir of Sicily. He ruled from June 23, 970 to his death in battle on July 13, 982.

== Background ==
In 947, the Fatimid caliph al-Mansur bi-Nasr Allah sent al-Hasan ibn Ali al-Kalbi to subdue a revolt on Sicily, where he would go on to establish his own ruling dynasty, the Kalbids. Al-Hasan was succeeded by his son, Ahmad ibn al-Hasan al-Kalbi, in 954. In 969 Ahmad was recalled to North Africa to assist in subduing a revolt by Berber tribesmen. Briefly in 969, one of Ahmad's freed slaves, Ya'ish, was appointed governor of Sicily. The next year Abu'l-Qasim, Ahmad's brother, was elevated to governor.

== Rule ==
During the spring of 976, Abu'l-Qasim launched a raiding expedition on Byzantine Italy. His first target was the city of Messina, which he found deserted upon arrival. He soon moved on to Apulia, taking tribute from Cosenza before sending his brother to raid the surrounding countryside. He soon crossed the straits back to Sicily. During the summer of the same year, Abu'l-Qasim crossed back to mainland Italy, where he quickly forced tribute out of St. Agatha and took and razed Taranto. He then sent one army to Otranto while he besieged Gravina, before retiring to Muslim lands for the year, bringing home hundreds of captives as slaves.

In May 982, Abu'l-Qasim returned to Italy hoping to confront the advancing German emperor Otto II. Around Rossano Calabro, Abu'l-Qasim spotted the German army and realized that he had hugely underestimated its size. He attempted to retreat back to Sicily, but Otto caught up with him around Capo Colonna. In the Battle of Stilo, the outnumbered Kalbid force was able to surround and defeat the German forces with an unexpectedly strong cavalry charge; Otto himself only escaped by swimming to a Greek merchant ship, but Abu'l-Qasim was killed in the melee.

== Sources ==
- Lilie, Ralph-Johannes; Ludwig, Claudia; Pratsch, Thomas; Zielke, Beate (2013). Prosopographie der mittelbyzantinischen Zeit Online. Berlin-Brandenburgische Akademie der Wissenschaften. Nach Vorarbeiten F. Winkelmanns erstellt (in German). Berlin and Boston: De Gruyter.
- Kaldellis, Anthony (2017). Streams of Gold, Rivers of Blood: The Rise and Fall of Byzantium, 955 A.D. to the First Crusade. Oxford University Press. ISBN 978-0190253226.
- Barkowski, Robert F. (2015). Crotone 982 (in Polish). Warszawa: Bellona. ISBN 978-83-11-13732-5.

Preceded by Ya'ish	Fatimid governor of Sicily; 969–982	Succeeded by Jabir al-Kalbi
