= Wasita (title) =

Title used in Fatimid Egypt

Wāsiṭa ("intermediary") was a title given to the senior administrative official in Fatimid Egypt in the late 10th and early 11th centuries.

The title signified the role of the chief minister as the "intermediary" between the Fatimid caliphs and the administration and the people, but was junior to the rank of vizier (wazīr), which was more common in the Islamic world. It was first given to al-Hasan ibn Ammar in 996, and continued to be held by several chief ministers during the reigns of al-Hakim bi-Amr Allah (r. 996–1021) and Ali az-Zahir (r. 1021–1036). With the rise of powerful military leaders who occupied the position of chief minister in the second half of the 11th century, however, the title was abandoned again in favour of that of vizier.

== Sources ==
- Lev, Yaacov (2002). "Wāsiṭa". In Bearman, P. J.; Bianquis, Th.; Bosworth, C. E.; van Donzel, E. & Heinrichs, W. P. (eds.). The Encyclopaedia of Islam, Second Edition. Volume XI: W–Z. Leiden: E. J. Brill. p. 171. ISBN 978-90-04-12756-2.
