= Ahmad ibn al-Hasan al-Kalbi =

Ahmad ibn al-Hasan al-Kalbi ﺍﺣﻤﺪ بن الحسن الكلبي

Emir of Sicily
- In office 954–969
- Monarch: Al-Mu'izz li-Din Allah
- Preceded by: al-Hasan ibn Ali al-Kalbi
- Succeeded by: Ali ibn al-Hasan al-Kalbi

Personal details
- Died: 969 Egypt

Military service
- Allegiance: Fatimid Caliphate
- Battles/wars: Muslim conquest of Sicily: Siege of Rometta (963); Battle of the Straits (965); Siege of Taormina (962); Fatimid conquest of Egypt

Ahmad ibn al-Hasan al-Kalbi (Arabic: ﺍﺣﻤﺪ بن الحسن الكلبي) was the second Kalbid Emir of Sicily. He was the son of the first Kalbid emir, al-Hasan ibn Ali al-Kalbi, who ruled the island on behalf of the Fatimid Caliphate. Ahmad succeeded his father in May 953 until 968, apart from a brief interruption in 958/9. In the 960s, he led the completion of the Muslim conquest of Sicily by capturing the last Byzantine strongholds of Taormina and Rometta and defeating a Byzantine relief expedition. He was recalled to Ifriqiya to participate in the upcoming Fatimid conquest of Egypt, and died there shortly after.

== Sources ==
- Brett, Michael (2001). The Rise of the Fatimids: The World of the Mediterranean and the Middle East in the Fourth Century of the Hijra, Tenth Century CE. The Medieval Mediterranean. Vol. 30. Leiden: BRILL. ISBN 9004117415.
- Halm, Heinz (1991). Das Reich des Mahdi: Der Aufstieg der Fatimiden [The Empire of the Mahdi: The Rise of the Fatimids] (in German). Munich: C. H. Beck. ISBN 3-406-35497-1.
- Lev, Yaacov (1984). "The Fāṭimid Navy, Byzantium and the Mediterranean Sea, 909–1036 CE/297–427 AH". Byzantion: Revue internationale des études byzantines. 54 (1): 220–252. ISSN 0378-2506. JSTOR 44170866.
- Lilie, Ralph-Johannes; Ludwig, Claudia; Pratsch, Thomas; Zielke, Beate (2013). Prosopographie der mittelbyzantinischen Zeit Online. Berlin-Brandenburgische Akademie der Wissenschaften. Nach Vorarbeiten F. Winkelmanns erstellt (in German). Berlin and Boston: De Gruyter.
- Metcalfe, Alex (2009), The Muslims of Medieval Italy, Edinburgh: Edinburgh University Press, ISBN 978-0-7486-2008-1

Preceded by al-Hasan ibn Ali al-Kalbi	Fatimid governor of Sicily; 954–969	Succeeded by Ya'ish
