= Thiqat al-Dawla =

Emir of Sicily from 989 to 997

Thiqat al-Dawla, born Yusuf b. Abd Allah al-Kalbi, was the Emir of the Emirate of Sicily from 990 to 998 AD. As Emir, Thiqat was known for his generosity as a patron of the arts and his military victories over the Byzantines.

Thiqat ruled over the Emirate at its peak, but his rule also marked the beginning of a period of decline that would eventually lead to its fall.

== Poetry ==
As a generous patron of the arts, Thiqat was often praised in poetry. Ibn Sa'id al-Maghribi described him as "a great king and a generous man. Poets and scholars would come to him from everywhere, so he elevated their ranks and was very charitable towards them" in his work al-Mughrib fī ḥulā l-Maghrib. Other poets such as Ibn al-Khayyat praised his military genius, defense of the Islamic faith, generosity, and wisdom. Muḥammad b. Abdūn al-Sūsī compared Thiqat to a full moon.
