= Roger Hamut =

Emir of Sicily

Roger Hamut, also known as Roger Hamutus, was a Christian landholder in Castrogiovanni between 1179 and 1193.

He may have a connection to Hammud/Chamutus, an Arab Muslim ruler who held Castrogiovanni (known as Qasr Yanih among the Arabs) before it fell to the Normans. He would convert to Christianity out of fear for his wife and children.
