= Siege of Taormina (962) =

962 Fatimid siege against Byzantine Sicily

- Part of Muslim conquest of Sicily
Date	March–December 962
Location	Taormina, Sicily
Result	Fatimid victory

Belligerents
Fatimid Caliphate	Byzantine Empire

Commanders and leaders
Ahmad ibn al-Hasan al-Kalbi	Unknown

The siege of Taormina in 962 was a successful siege by the Fatimid governors of Sicily of the main Byzantine fortress on the island, Taormina.

== Background ==
The Byzantine Empire witnessed a surge in its military power in the 960s. The Byzantines established control over most of Apulia and Calabria. In the year 961, the Byzantine general Nikephoros II Phokas retook the island of Crete, followed by the recapture of Cyprus in 965. The Muslim power in the eastern Mediterranean was weakened. Meanwhile, the Fatimid-Kalbid raids infested mainland Italy. The Fatimid Caliph, al-Mu'izz li-Din Allah, was not able to save Crete. The Byzantine victories prompted the Fatimids to conquer the remaining Byzantine fortress in Sicily. This prompted the governor of Sicily, Ahmad ibn al-Hasan al-Kalbi, to gather a large number of Sicilian Muslims to attack the fort of Taormina. He also dispatched a letter to Africa for strong reinforcements.

== Siege ==
The Fatimids then marched to lay siege to Taormina at the end of the spring of the year 962. The citizens and the Byzantine garrison defended themselves there with great valor, and although at the beginning of August a hoped-for relief arrived from Africa under the command of the alcaide Ben-Ammar, who was the paternal uncle of Ahmad, the siege continued until the following December, but in the end the city fell, as is believed, to an assault. 1,570 of the inhabitants (approximately one-fifth of the population) went as slaves to the Fatimid Caliph al-Mu'iz. The town was renamed al-Mu'izziyya, and Muslim settlers were brought in.

== Aftermath ==
Following the Fatimid victories in the siege of Rometta and the Battle of the Straits in 964–965, the fall of Taormina marked the end of the last Byzantine footholds on Sicily and the final stage of the Muslim conquest of the island.

== Sources ==
- Brett, Michael (2001). The Rise of the Fatimids: The World of the Mediterranean and the Middle East in the Fourth Century of the Hijra, Tenth Century CE. The Medieval Mediterranean. Vol. 30. Leiden: BRILL. ISBN 9004117415.
- Metcalfe, Alex (2009). The Muslims of Medieval Italy. Edinburgh: Edinburgh University Press. ISBN 978-0-7486-2008-1.
- Giovanni Battista Caruso (1875), History of Sicily, Vol I (In Italian).
