= Kalbids =

Ruling dynasty of the Emirate of Sicily from 948 to 1053

Kalbids بنو كلب
- Emirs
- Country: Emirate of Sicily
- Founded: 948
- Founder: Al-Hasan ibn Ali al-Kalbi
- Final ruler: Hasan as-Samsam
- Titles: Emir of Sicily
- Dissolution: 1053

Italy in 1000 CE.

The Kalbids (Arabic: بنو كلب, romanized: Banū Kalb) were a Muslim Arab dynasty which ruled the Emirate of Sicily from 948 to 1053. They were formally appointed by the Fatimids, but gained, progressively, de facto autonomous rule.

== Family origins ==
The Kalbids descended from the Arab tribe of Banu Kalb, members of which frequently served as governors, administrators and high-ranking officials in Ifriqiya (central North Africa) during the Umayyad period (c. 670s–750). During the rule of the Aghlabids in Ifriqiya (800–909), the fortunes of the Kalb declined as the rulers there favored the tribe's rivals from the Qays–Mudar group. When the Fatimids conquered Ifriqiya in 909, the Kalb, having been an important military and religious support for the Fatimids, were quick to attain high influence in the new regime. By this time, the Kalbids were allied with the Kutama Berbers, a mainstay of the Fatimid army.

== History ==
In 827, in the midst of internal Byzantine conflict, the Muslim conquest of Sicily began: the Aghlabids arrived at Mazara in Sicily, with a fleet of 10,000 men under the command of Asad ibn al-Furat. Palermo was conquered in 831 and became the new capital. Syracuse fell in 878 and in 902 the last Byzantine outpost, Taormina, was taken. At the same time various Muslim incursions into southern Italy occurred, with new Emirates being founded in Tropea, Taranto and Bari. During this period there were constant power struggles amongst the Muslims. Nominally the island was under rule of the Aghlabids and afterward their Fatimid successors.

After successfully suppressing a revolt the Fatimid caliph appointed al-Hasan al-Kalbi (948–953) as Emir of Sicily, the first of the Kalbid dynasty. The Fatimids appointed the Kalbids as rulers via proxy before they shifted their capital from Ifriqiya to Cairo in 969. Raids into southern Italy continued under the Kalbids into the 11th century, and in 982 a German army under Otto II was defeated by Abu'l-Qasim in the Battle of Stilo near Crotone in Calabria. The dynasty began a steady period of decline under the reign of Yusuf al-Kalbi (990–998) who entrusted the island to his sons and created space for interference from the Zirids of Ifriqiya. Under al-Akhal (1017–1037) the dynastic conflict intensified, with factions allying themselves variously with Byzantium and the Zirids. Even though neither of these powers could establish themselves in Sicily permanently, under Hasan as-Samsam (1040–1053) the island fragmented into small fiefdoms. The Kalbids died out in 1053, and in 1061 the Normans of southern Italy arrived under Roger I of Sicily and began their conquest, which was completed in 1091. The Muslims were allowed to remain and played an important role in the administration, army and economy of the Norman kingdom until the 12th century.

== Social and economic policies ==
The Kalbites focused their efforts on the Islamization of Sicilian society, notably in 962 with a large ceremony, where fourteen thousand children were circumcised simultaneously; after a Byzantine offensive, crushed in 965 at the Battle of the Ditch or Rametta, the Fatimid Caliph Mu'izz had the Kalbite emir enacted a policy of Incastellamento in 967, a movement which profoundly transformed the social structure of the region. It forced a regrouping of all inhabitants in a small number of cities (one per district), each guarded by a castle and equipped with a Friday mosque, essential to ensure political fidelity and religious indoctrination. It was not just a question of bringing Islam into the Sicilian way of life, but also of conveying the Shiite message on which the dynasty is based.

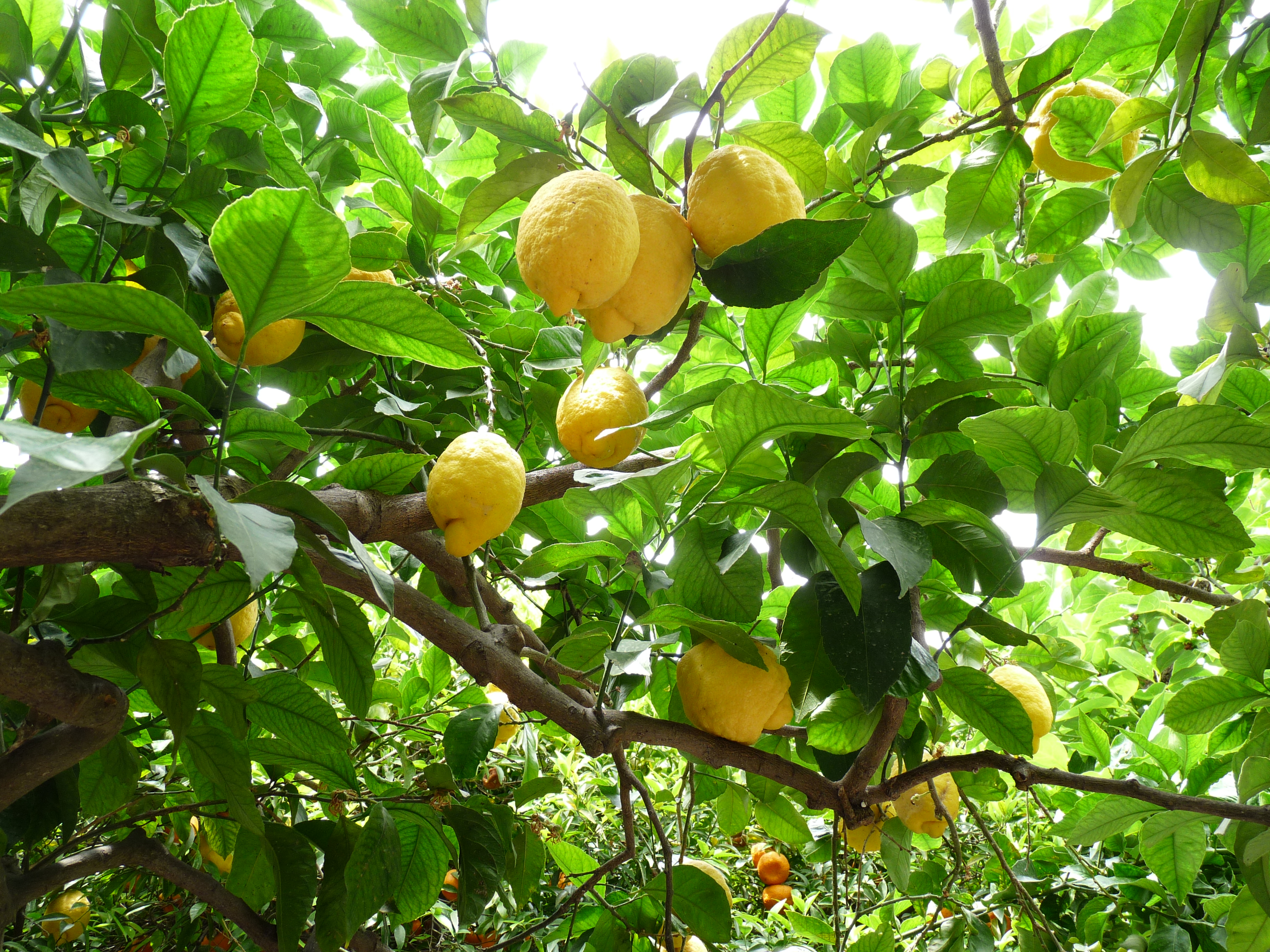
Citrus fruit, like lemons, are said to have been introduced to Sicily under the Kalbids

Under the Kalbid dynasty, Sicily, and especially Palermo, was an important economic centre of the Mediterranean. The Muslims introduced lemons, Seville oranges and sugar cane, as well as cotton and mulberries for sericulture, and built irrigation systems for agriculture. Sicily was also an important hub for trade between the Near East, North Africa and the Italian maritime republics such as Amalfi, Pisa and Genoa.

== Rulers ==
- al-Hasan al-Kalbi (948–953)
- Ahmad ibn al-Hasan al-Kalbi (954–969)
- Ya'ish (969–970)
- Abu'l-Qasim Ali ibn al-Hasan al-Kalbi (970–982)
- Jabir ibn Ali ibn al-Kalbi (982–983)
- Ja'far I ibn Muhammad ibn al-Kalbi (983–985)
- Abdallah ibn Muhammad ibn al-Kalbi (985–990)
- Abu'l-Futuh Yusuf ibn Abdallah ibn al-Kalbi (990–998)
- Ja'far II ibn al-Kalbi (998–1019)
- al-Akhal (1019–1037)
- Abdallah (1037–1040), Zirid usurper
- Hasan as-Samsam (1040–1053)

== See also ==
- History of Islam in Southern Italy

== Sources ==
- Amari, Michele (1933–1939). Storia dei musulmani di Sicilia (in Italian). Catania: Romeo Prampolini.
- Rizzitano, U. (1978). "Kalbids". In van Donzel, E.; Lewis, B.; Pellat, Ch. & Bosworth, C. E. (eds.). The Encyclopaedia of Islam, Second Edition. Volume IV: Iran–Kha. Leiden: E. J. Brill. pp. 496–497. doi:10.1163/1573-3912_islam_SIM_3822. ISBN 978-90-04-05745-6. OCLC 758278456.
