= Rometta =

Rometta Ρομέττα (Greek)
- Comune
- Comune di Rometta
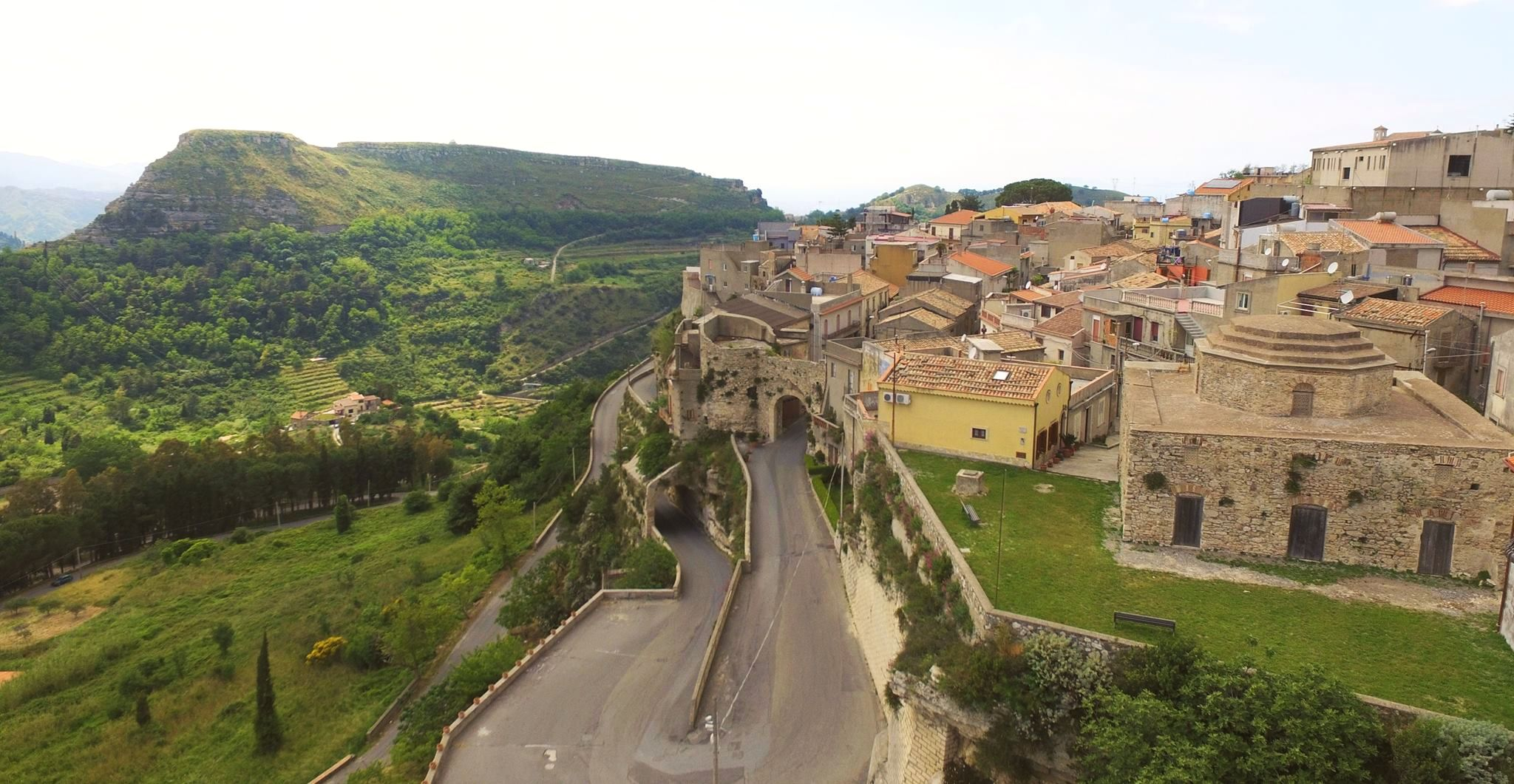
- Skyline

- Location within Italy Location within Sicily
- Coordinates: 38°10′N 15°25′E
- Country: Italy
- Region: Sicily
- Metropolitan city: Messina (ME)
- Frazioni: Rometta Marea, Gimello, Mazzabruno, Santa Domenica, Rapano, San Cono, Sotto Castello, S. Andrea

Government
  - Mayor: Antonino Cirino

Area
  - Total: 32.5 km^{2} (12.5 sq mi)
- Elevation: 560 m (1,840 ft)

Population (30 November 2012)
  - Total: 6,532
  - Density: 201/km^{2} (521/sq mi)
- Demonym: Romettesi
- Time zone: UTC+1 (CET)
  - Summer (DST): UTC+2 (CEST)
- Postal code: 98043
- Dialing code: 090
- Patron saint: St. Leo of Catania
- Saint day: 20 February
- Website: Official website

Rometta (Sicilian: Ramietta) is a comune (municipality) in the Metropolitan City of Messina in the Italian region Sicily, located about 180 kilometres (110 mi) east of Palermo and about 12 kilometres (7 mi) west of Messina. It was the last bastion of Sicily controlled by the Eastern Roman Empire (Byzantium), and falling only in 965 to the Kalbids' Muslim army in the Siege of Rometta.

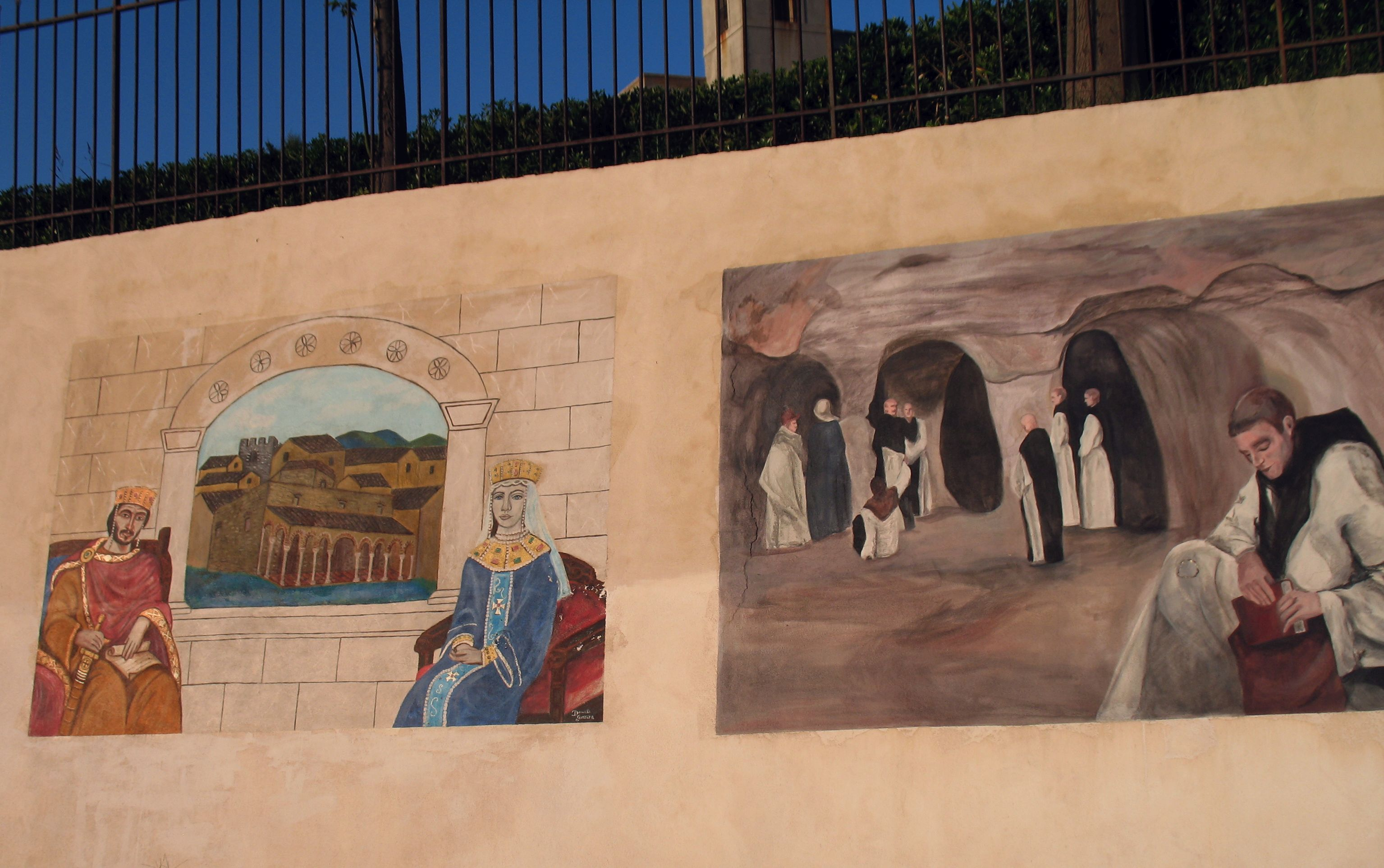
Some of the murals in Via Federico II di Svevia

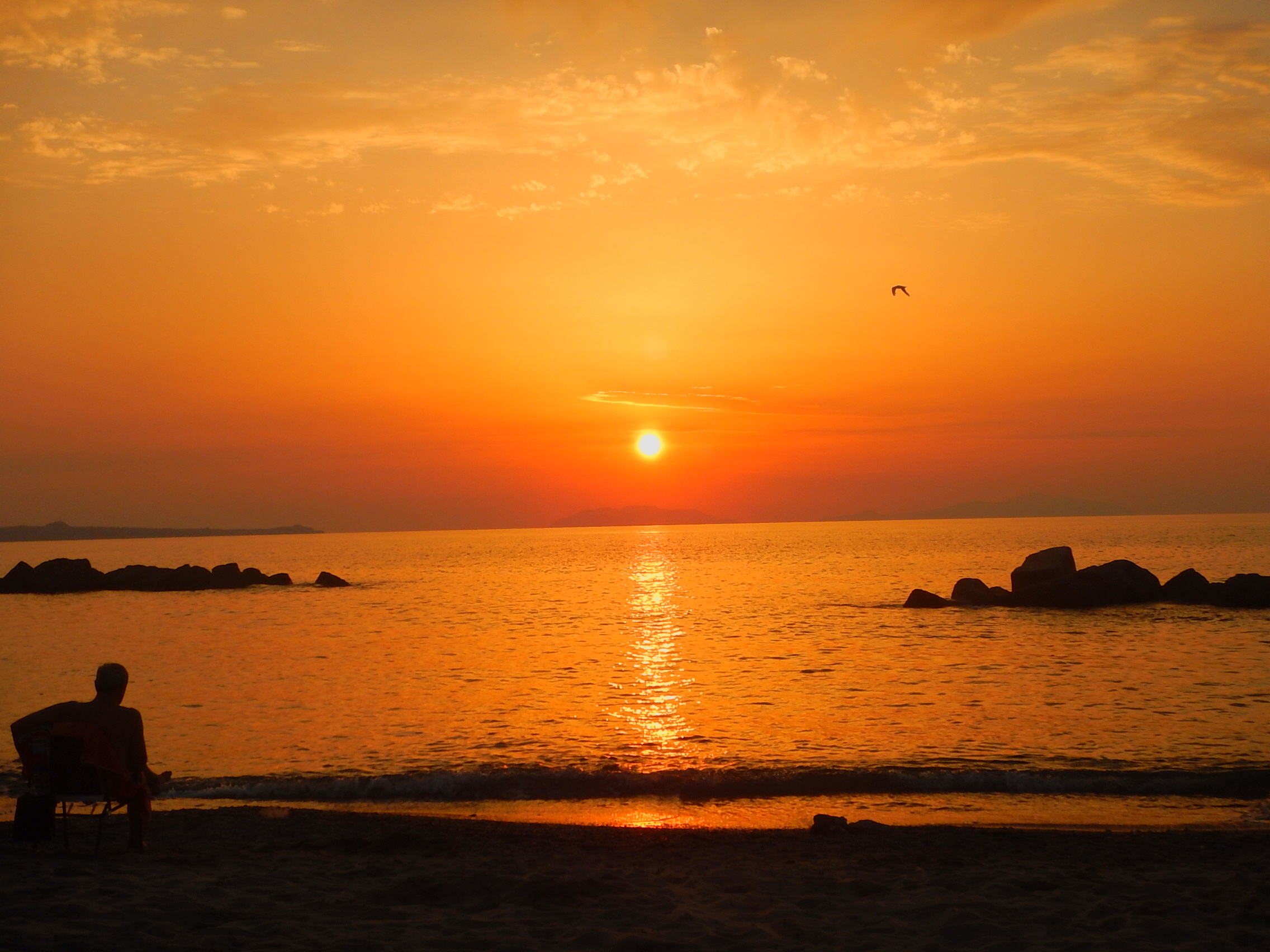
The beach of Rometta facing cape Milazzo and Aeolian islands at the sunset.

Rometta borders the following municipalities: Messina, Monforte San Giorgio, Roccavaldina, Saponara, Venetico, Spadafora.
