= Abbas I's Shirvan campaign =

- Part of the Ottoman–Safavid War of 1603–1618
Date	1606–1607
Location	Shirvan
Result	Safavid victory
Territorial changes	Reconquest of Shirvan

Belligerents
(Safavid Iran) Safavid Empire	Ottoman Empire

Commanders and leaders
(Safavid Iran) Abbas the Great (Safavid Iran) Allahverdi Khan (Safavid Iran) Qarachaqay Khan	(Ottoman Empire) Mehmed Pasha (executed) (Ottoman Empire) Ahmed Pasha (POW) (Ottoman Empire) Shamsuddin Pasha (executed)

Casualties and losses
Unknown	Ganja: 2,500 killed Shamakhi: 2,000–3,000 killed Total: 4,500–5,500

Abbas I's Shirvan campaign took place in 1606–1607, during the Ottoman–Safavid War of 1603–1618. The Safavids had lost control over the province by the Treaty of Constantinople of 1590. In the winter of 1606, Safavid king (shah) Abbas I (r. 1588–1629), invaded Shirvan. Derbent and Baku soon fell as a result of pro-Safavid uprisings and in the spring of 1607 Abbas I and his men successfully besieged Shamakhi, the provincial capital of Shirvan. With the reconquest of Shirvan, the Safavids had recovered all territories lost to the Ottomans in 1590. (see Treaty of Nasuh Pasha)

== Sources ==
- Blow, David (2009). Shah Abbas: The Ruthless King Who became an Iranian Legend. London, UK: I. B. Tauris & Co. Ltd. p. 20. ISBN 978-1845119898. LCCN 2009464064.
- Emiralioğlu, Pinar (2014). Geographical Knowledge and Imperial Culture in the Early Modern Ottoman Empire. Ashgate Publishing, Ltd. ISBN 978-1472415332.
- Farrokh, Kaveh (20 December 2011). Iran at War: 1500-1988. Bloomsbury Publishing. ISBN 978-1-78096-240-5.
