= Siege of Naples (958) =

- Part of the Arab–Byzantine wars and the Muslim conquest of Sicily
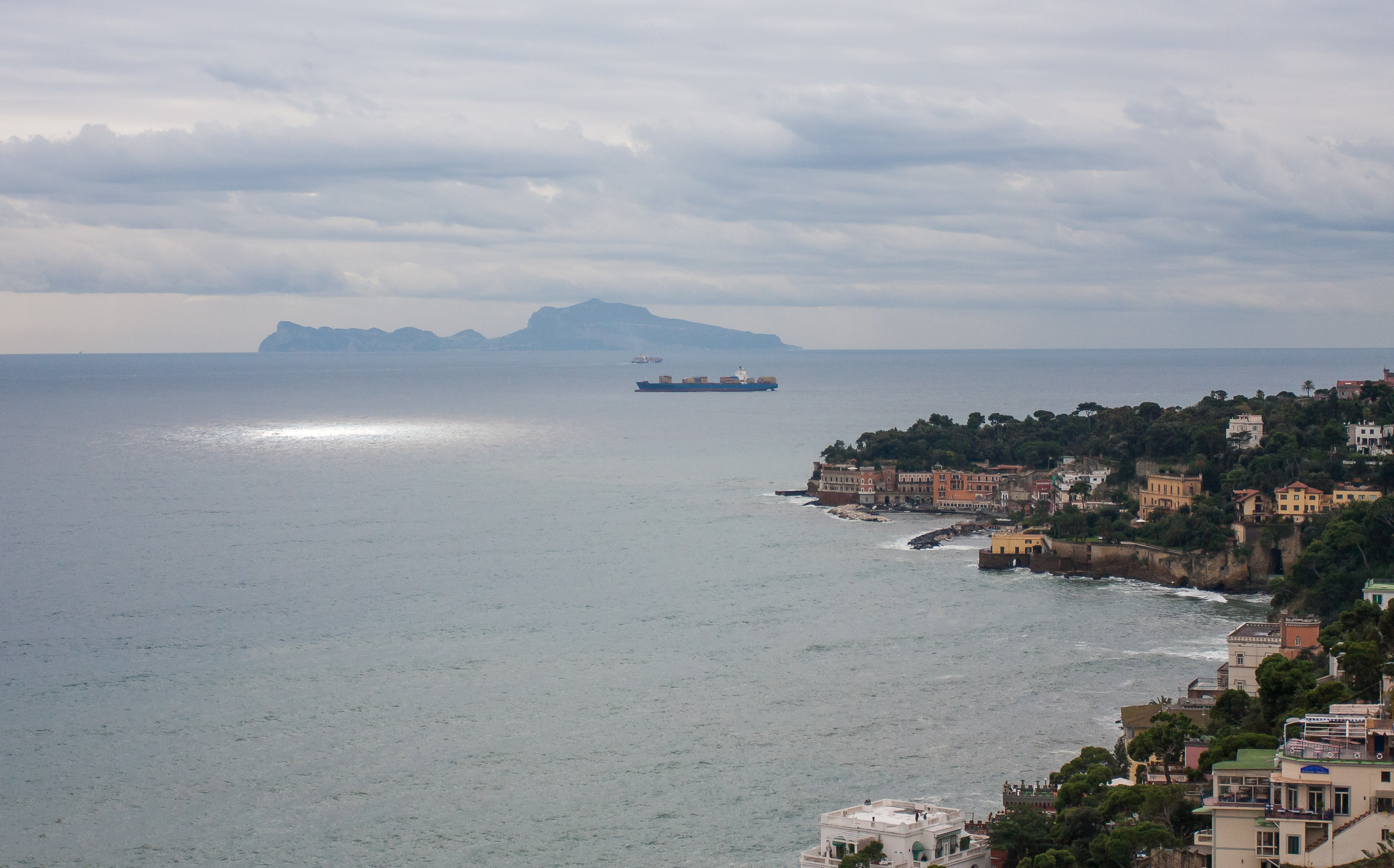
- Modern view of the Gulf of Naples
Date	Late spring 958 (Note: John Wortley places Marianos Argyros' arrival in Italy to 955, while Denis Sullivan and Alexander Vasiliev date it to 956, with Vasiliev reasoning that he remained in the region until 958 and participated in operations during that year. Ilkka Syvänne places Marianos Argyros' arrival in 958 following the Arabic sources, which explicitly state that the first reinforcing officer dispatched by the Byzantines to Italy was Basil Protokarbos in 957. Consequently, there exists no definitive consensus on the dating of these campaigns.)
Location	Naples, Campania
Result	Byzantine victory
Territorial changes	Byzantine recapture of Naples

Belligerents
Byzantine Empire	Fatimid Caliphate; Duchy of Naples

Commanders and leaders
Marianos Argyros; Krambeas; Moroleon	Ammar ibn Ali al-Kalbi; Al-Hasan ibn Ali al-Kalbi

Strength
Large fleet and army	Large fleet

Casualties and losses
Unknown	Very Heavy

The Siege of Naples was an investment conducted by the Byzantine military against Italian Neapolitan rebels within the city, who were aided by the Fatimid navy. The Byzantines blockaded Naples by land and sea and inflicted a disastrous defeat upon a Fatimid relief fleet during the course of the siege. Ultimately, the rebel forces were reduced by starvation and forced to surrender to the Byzantines, who reasserted their military presence in Southern Italy after a number of recent setbacks.

== Background ==
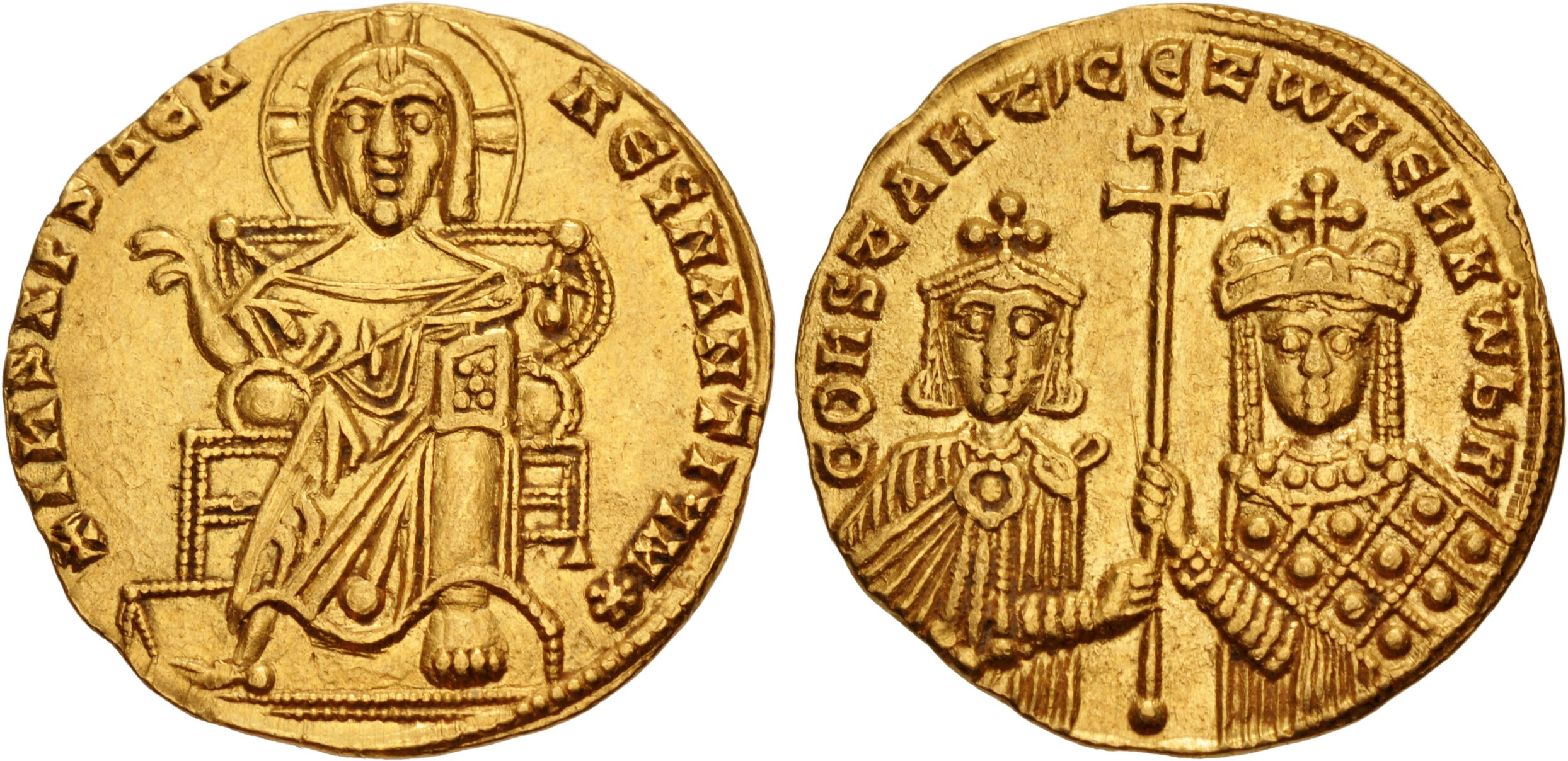
Solidus depicting Christ Pantocrator and Emperor Constantine VII with his mother, Empress Zoe Karbonopsina

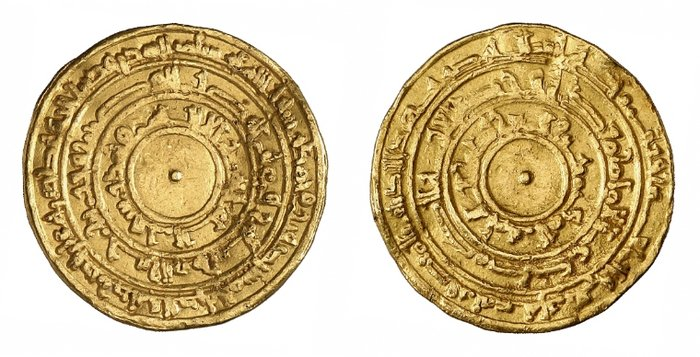
Golden dinar of Caliph al-Mu'izz li-Din Allah

In spring 957, the Fatimid commander Al-Hasan ibn Ali al-Kalbi had conducted a successful campaign against the allied maritime forces of the Byzantine Empire and the Umayyad Caliphate of Córdoba around the Island of Sicily, defeating enemy fleets in two engagements, before disembarking his troops in Calabria, where they ravaged several villages and burned down many churches. The military failures of the Byzantines and successful plunder of Calabria by the Fatimids likely caused the citizens of Naples and the Lombard subjects to rebel against the empire. Although the Byzantine commander Basil Protokarabos (likely the Cibyrrhaeot commander Basil Hexamilites) was able to inflict a number of reversals upon the Fatimids near Sicily, after being dispatched with reinforcements by Emperor Constantine VII later in 957, quelling the revolt in Italy demanded a more concerted imperial military effort. Thus, a larger fleet and army were assembled to conduct an expedition into Southern Italy, and Marianos Argyros was appointed their commander.

== Siege and battle ==
In 958, Marianos began his campaign into Southern Italy. To ensure sufficient forces were allocated to the task, the Thracian and Macedonian thematic armies were assigned to Marianos, while a strong fleet, including the subcommanders Krambeas and Moroleon with their retinues, accompanied the Byzantine expedition. Around the same time, the Byzantines dispatched an emissary in an attempt to sign a ceasefire with the Fatimids, seeking to isolate Naples from external support, but the Fatimids rejected this endeavour. Instead, the Caliph al-Mu'izz prepared a fleet of his own to counter the Byzantines in Italy, which was to be commanded both by Al-Hasan and his brother Ammar, two highly experienced and talented naval commanders from Ifriqiya. However, the Byzantines succeeded in renewing peace with Bulgaria, which facilitated the transferral of men from their European themes. The expeditionary forces disembarked near Otranto and marched forth towards Naples. There, Marianos enacted a tight blockade of the rebel city, with his army enveloping the landward approaches, while the fleet blocked all of the seaward routes to Naples. (Note: Anthony Kaldellis questions the narrative of Theophanes Continuatus and casts doubt on his narrative and the detail of the Duchy of Naples rebelling against Byzantium. He instead proposes that the naval victory over the Fatimids as described by Theophanes, if it did occur, was against a Fatimid fleet attempting to raid the coasts of Campania. However, this view has not been accepted as consensus. Alexander Vasiliev accepted Theophanes' account of the Byzantine conflict against Neapolitan and Lombard rebels as being reliable, as has Ilkka Syvänne.)

During the course of the campaign, the Fatimid armada under Hasan and Ammar arrived on the Campanian coasts and attempted to derail Marianos in a decisive naval battle. According to the account of the Sunni Cambridge Chronicle, a Byzantine squadron fought a brief engagement against the brothers, in the course of which one Fatimid warship was destroyed, after which the Byzantines were routed. The Byzantine historian Theophanes Continuatus describes a greater engagement between the main respective fleets of the Fatimids and Byzantines. The vessels of both sides joined in fierce fighting with their formations becoming intertwined, with Byzantine Greek fire, launched from mechanical siphons, inflicting extensive damage against the Fatimids. At some point during the course of the fighting, a strong wind developed which blew against the caliphate's fleet, while boosting the momentum of the Byzantines. This development proved decisive, with the wind at their backs affording the Byzantines greater speed and manoeuvrability, which enabled them to sink a great numbers of Fatimid warships, along with their crews. The Fatimid fleet was ultimately defeated. Under a modern reconstruction, the Sunni accounts are reconciled with that of Continuatus, with initial engagement and flight of the Byzantine squadron representing a feigned retreat which drew the Fatimids toward Marianos' main fleet, and had possibly leveraged geographical features of islands and peninsulas lining the Gulf of Naples to conceal its strength. This enabled the Byzantines to engage the Fatimids at a time and place of their choosing, with their admirals having analysed the weather patterns around the Gulf of Naples during the course of the siege to determine the optimal conditions, in order to engage the approaching enemy while the wind blew against them. These measures facilitated a decisive Byzantine victory that ensured the success of their campaign in Naples.

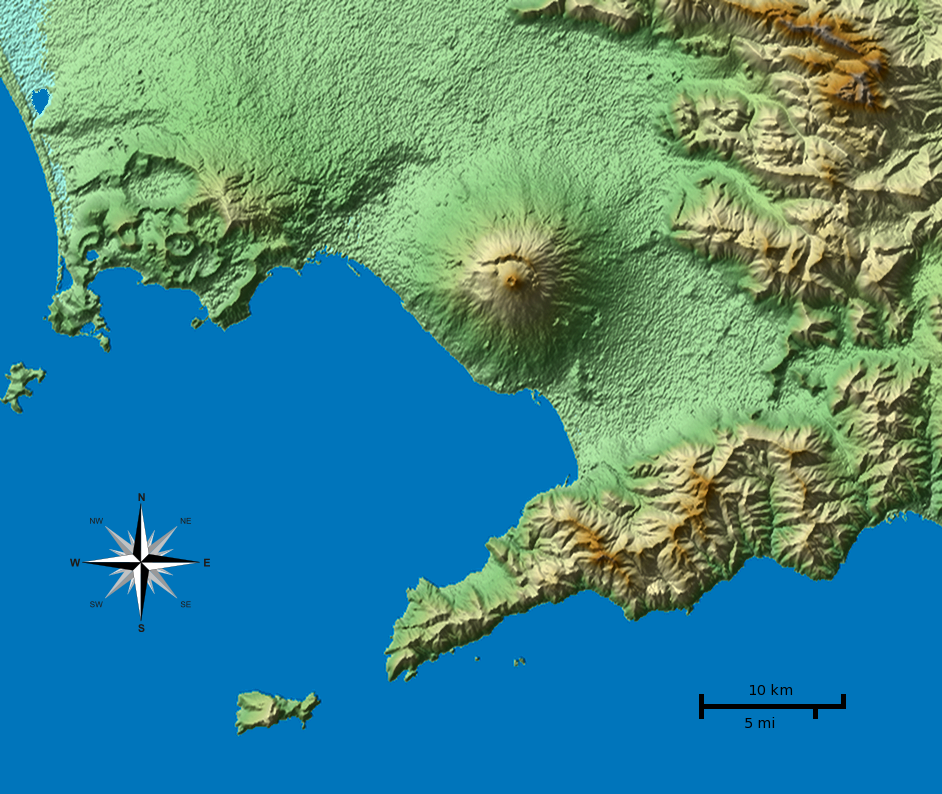
Topographic map of the Gulf of Naples

The defeat of the Fatimid fleet determined the fate of Naples. With the blockade intact, the rebel garrison was reduced by starvation and forced to surrender to Marianos Argyros and his men. The Byzantines thus reasserted their authority over their vassal Duchy of Naples. The Fatimid admirals Hassan and Ammar were able to extract themselves from the defeat near Naples with a portion of their fleet, and attempted to retreat to their bases in Sicily. However, as they approached the waters near Palermo, the remnants of the Fatimid fleet were struck by a tempest and were nearly annihilated. Hasan narrowly avoided shipwreck, but his brother Ammar's warship was sunk in the disaster, with the admiral drowning. Ammar's body was retrieved amongst the debris the following morning, allowing Hasan to arrange a funeral for his brother.

== Aftermath ==
In late 958, both the Byzantines and Fatimids were eager to reach a truce, with the Byzantines having sustained severe losses from their defeats in 956 and early 957, while conversely the Fatimid defeats in the latter half of the war, as well as the maritime disasters dealt by storms, had depleted their strength. The Shia historian Qadi al-Numan claimed that the Byzantines were desperate for peace and dispatched emissaries to Tunis, while Continuatus claimed it was the Caliph al-Mu'izz who begged for a truce with envoys sent to Constantinople. (Note: The biases present in the available sources from both sides have led to certain conflicting details on the events of the conflict. Theophanes Continuatus omits details of the defeats suffered by the Byzantines in 956 and early 957 and does not mention the payment of tribute by Byzantium to Caliph al-Mu'izz in exchange for their truce with the Fatimids. Conversely, the pro-Fitimid Shiite Qadi al-Numan conceals the defeats sustained by the Fatimid navy, first at the hands of Basil protokarabos in late 957, and then near Naples in 958. The Sunni source Cambridge Chronicle and Kitab al-'Uyun offer additional details on these events, though a coherent reconstruction is difficult to establish.) In any event, both sides were ready to conclude a peace, as the Fatimids remained at war with the Umayyads, while the Byzantines sought to transfer the forces serving under Marianos back from Italy, both to confront a recent Magyar invasion of Thrace, and to bolster operations against the Hamdanid and Cretan saracens. Although the Byzantines had regained the strategic initiative in Italy with their victories in the latter half of 957 and 958, the pressures on other frontiers may have necessitated some concessions to the Fatimids in return for peace, with the Byzantines agreeing to pay a tribute to the al-Mu'izz according to Qadi al-Numan. Consequently, a truce was successfully negotiated by Fatimid envoys in Constantinople in the Summer of 958. When warfare later resumed in 962, the Fatimids had their revanche, winning a number of successes, which effectively ended Byzantine rule in Sicily.

== Bibliography ==
- Syvänne, Ilkka (2025). Nikephoros II Phokas, 912–969: The White Death of the Saracens. Pen and Sword. ISBN 978-1399005289.
- Vasiliev, A. A. (1968). Byzance et les Arabes, Tome II, 1ére partie: Les relations politiques de Byzance et des Arabes à L'époque de la dynastie macédonienne (867–959) (in French). French ed.: Henri Grégoire, Marius Canard. Brussels: Éditions de l'Institut de Philologie et d'Histoire Orientales.
- Lilie, Ralph-Johannes; Ludwig, Claudia; Pratsch, Thomas; Zielke, Beate (2013). Prosopographie der mittelbyzantinischen Zeit Online. Berlin-Brandenburgische Akademie der Wissenschaften. Nach Vorarbeiten F. Winkelmanns erstellt (in German). Berlin and Boston: De Gruyter.
- Kaldellis, Anthony (2017). Streams of Gold, Rivers of Blood: The Rise and Fall of Byzantium, 955 A.D. to the First Crusade. Oxford University Press. ISBN 978-0190253226.
- Wortley, John, ed. (2010). John Skylitzes: A Synopsis of Byzantine History, 811–1057. Cambridge: Cambridge University Press. ISBN 978-0-521-76705-7.
- Sullivan, Denis (2018). The Rise and Fall of Nikephoros II Phokas: Five Contemporary Texts in Annotated Translations: 23 (Byzantina Australiensia, 23). Brill. ISBN 978-9004382206.
