= Feigned retreat =

Military tactic

A feigned retreat is a military tactic, a type of feint, whereby a military force will pretend to withdraw or to have been routed, in order to lure an enemy into a position of vulnerability. A feigned retreat is one of the more difficult tactics for a military force to undertake, and requires well-disciplined soldiers. This is because if the enemy presses into the retreating body, then undisciplined troops are likely to lose coherence and the rout will become genuine.

== History ==
=== Antiquity ===
Sun Tzu (544?–496? BCE) wrote, in the Chinese military treatise The Art of War: "Do not pursue an enemy who simulates flight." This advice cautioned against pursuing an enemy that unexpectedly runs away or shows a weaker force, as it may be bait for an ambush.

Herodotus reported that the Spartans used the feigned-retreat tactic at the Battle of Thermopylae (480 BCE) to defeat a force of Persian Immortals.

Before the Battle of Agrigentum, in Sicily (262 BCE)—the first pitched battle of the First Punic War, and the first large-scale military confrontation between Carthage and the Roman Republic—the Carthaginian general Hanno, son of Hannibal, was sent to provide relief to the Carthaginians besieged at Agrigentum by the Romans. Hanno told his Numidian cavalry to attack the Roman cavalry and then feign retreat. The Romans pursued the Numidians as they retreated and were brought to the main Carthaginian column, where they suffered many losses. The Roman siege lasted several months before the Romans defeated the Carthaginians and forced Hannibal to retreat.

In 221 BCE, Xenoetas, an Achaean Greek in the service of the Seleucid King Antiochus III the Great, was sent with an army against the rebel satrap of Media, Molon. Xenoetas crossed the Tigris River but fell into a trap laid by Molon, who feigned a retreat and, suddenly returning, surprised Xenoetas when most of the latter's forces were sunk in drunken sleep. Xenoetas was killed, and his army was cut to pieces.

The Lusitanians favored the tactic of retreating and then turning to attack pursuers when the latter had become disorganized in the chase. Their chieftain Caesarus employed it to defeat Lucius Mummius in 153 BCE, and later Viriathus would use it again to achieve victories against other Roman generals.

=== Middle ages ===
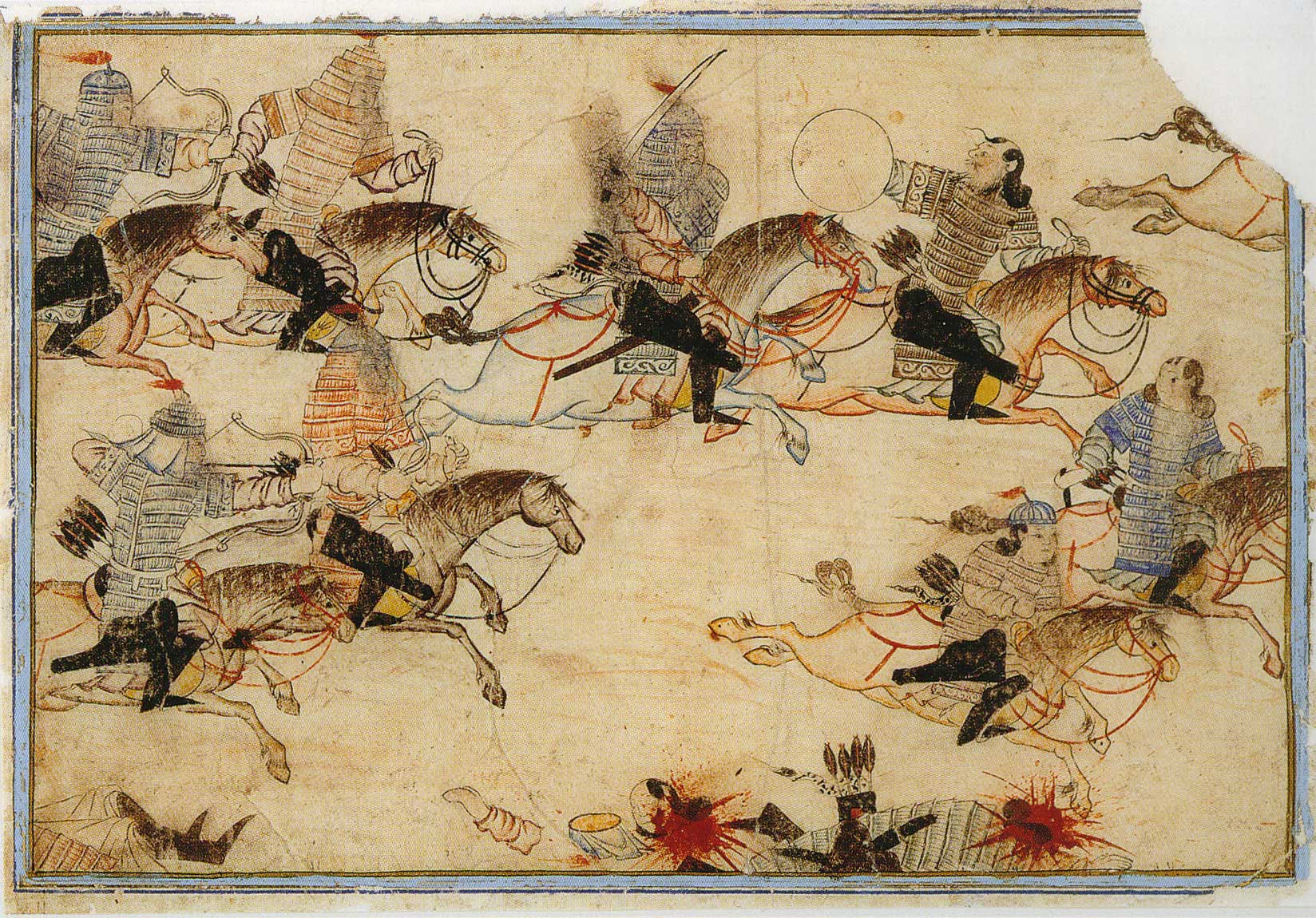
The feigned retreat formed a component of Mongol military tactics in the Eurasian steppe.

According to the Historia Regum Anglorum, following the invasion of the Danes, the rival kings Osberht and Ælla of the Northumbrian throne were said to "hav[e] united their forces and formed an army, came to the city of York" on 21 March 867. A majority of the Vikings gave the impression of fleeing from the approaching Northumbrians. "The Christians, perceiving their flight and terror", attacked, but found that the Vikings "were the stronger party". Surrounded, the Northumbrians "fought upon each side with much ferocity" until both Osberht and Ælla were killed.

In their 12 June 910 CE Battle of Lechfeld, fought south of Augsburg and known in Hungary as the Battle of Augsburg, the maneuverable Magyar (Hungarian) light cavalry, expertly wielding their composite bows, repeatedly used feigned retreats to draw out the heavy cavalry of one of King Louis the Child's two German forces. The Hungarians destroyed first the German heavy cavalry, then the approaching German infantry. (The Hungarians had successfully used similar tactics 11 years earlier, in 899 CE, against an Italian army at the Battle of Brenta River.) Ten days later, on 22 June 910 CE, in the Battle of Rednitz, the Hungarians annihilated King Louis' other German army.

During the second half of the 11th century, the Normans adapted this tactic and applied it successfully in different theatres of war such as in the Byzantine Empire, England, Southern Italy, and Outremer. Famous examples include the Battle of Dyrrhachium (1081) and the Battle of Hastings (1066) under William the Conqueror. It has been suggested, among others by Bernard Bachrach, that the Normans were influenced by the steppe tribe of the Alans that had settled in northern France in the fifth century.

At the same time, the Seljuk Turks used this tactic multiple times against various opponents in the Middle East. This ranged from feigned retreats when approaching the battle line to draw out individuals or groups of individuals during one engagement, to retreats lasting up to several days. Thus, at the Battle of Harran (7 May 1104) between the Crusader states of the Principality of Antioch and the County of Edessa, on the one hand, and the Seljuk Turks on the other, the Seljuks rode away from the Crusaders in a feigned retreat. The Crusaders pursued for some two days. When the Seljuks turned to fight, the Crusaders were caught unawares and were routed.

During the Mongol conquest of Khwarezmia (1219–21), on the third day of Genghis Khan's 1220 assault on its capital, Samarkand's garrison launched a counterattack. Genghis Khan, feigning retreat, drew about half of Samarkand's garrison outside the city's fortifications and slaughtered them in open combat.

=== Early Modernity ===
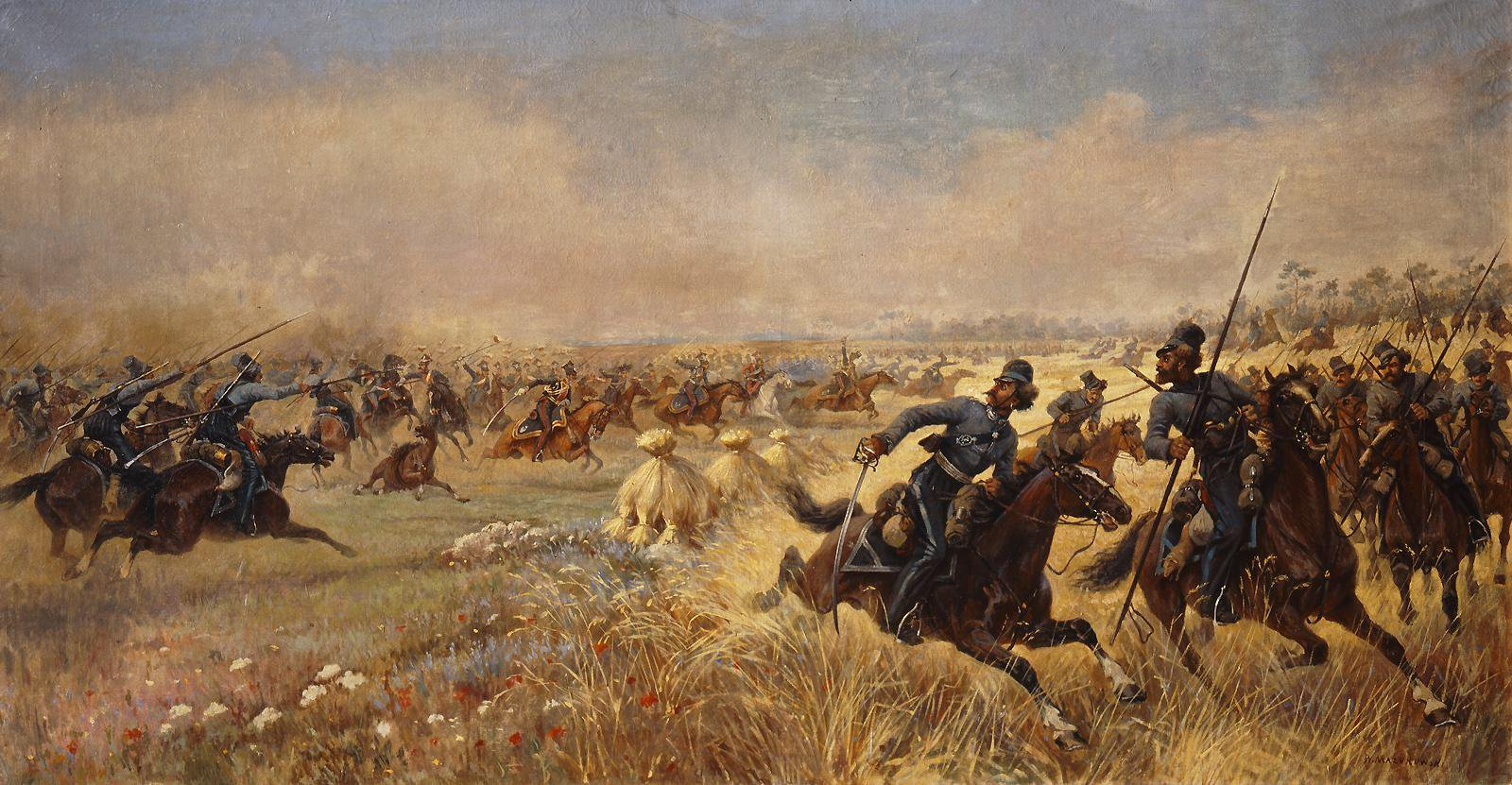
Cossacks executing a feigned retreat against Polish uhlans during the Battle of Mir, 1812

Spanish general Gonzalo Fernández de Córdoba adopted the tornafluye or tornafuye, a Moor tactic which involved launching a light cavalry charge, retreating to lead the opposing force to give pursuit, and then turning back to them again to attack with the advantage of confusion.

At the Battle of Kizaki, in Japan (June 1572), the forces of Shimazu Yoshihiro, outnumbered ten to one by those of Itō Yoshisuke, prevailed, using their famous feigned retreat.

Qazi Nur Mohammad, who accompanied Ahmad Shah Durrani on his seventh attempted invasion of Punjab, wrote about the use of feigned retreats by Sikhs and warned of its effectiveness in his Jangnama, comparing it to setting fire to water.

== Examples ==
- Battle of Marathon (490 BCE)
- Battle of Agrigentum (262 BCE)
- Battle of the Bagradas River (c. 240 BCE)
- Battle of the Trebia (218 BCE)
- Battle of Tigranocerta (69 BCE)
- Battle of Carrhae (53 BCE)
- Battle of the Bagradas River (49 BCE)
- Battle of Lugdunum (197)
- Battle of Bowang (202)
- Battle of Abritus (251)
- Battle of Naissus (268)
- Caucasian Campaign of Bahram Chobin (589)
- Battle of Salsu (612)
- Heraclius' campaign of 622
- Battle of Sarus (625)
- Battle of Nineveh (627)
- Battle of Walaja (633)
- Battle of Nahāvand (642)
- Battle of Dun Nechtain (685)
- Battle of Amblève (716)
- Battle of Brenta (899)
- Battle of Lechfeld (910)
- Battle of Püchen (919)
- Battle of Naples (958)
- Battle of Arcadiopolis (970)
- Battle of Conquereuil (992)
- Battle of Hastings (1066)
- Battle of Kalavrye (1078)
- Battle of Larissa (1083)
- Battle of Harran (1104)
- Battle of Al-Sannabra (1113)
- Siege of Sozopolis (1120)
- Battle of Cresson (1187)
- Battle of Beroia (1187)
- Second Battle of Tarain (1192)
- Battle of Adrianople (1205)
- Battle of Khunan (1222)
- Battle of the Kalka River (1223)
- Battle of Chmielnik (1241)
- Battle of Legnica (1241)
- Battle of Ain Jalut (1260)
- Battle of Moclín (1280)
- Battle of the Gulf of Naples (1284)
- Battle of Kili (1299)
- Battle of Cocherel (1364)
- Battle of the Vorskla River (1399)
- Battle of Grunwald (1410)
- Battle of Lipany (1434)
- Battle of Ohrid (1464)
- Battle of Krbava Field (1493)
- Battle of Marv (1510)
- Battle of Acajutla (1524)
- Battle of Ancrum Moor (1545)
- Battle of Kizaki (1572)
- Battle of Hansan Island (1592)
- Battle of Traigh Ghruinneart (1598)
- Battle of Mirăslău (1600)
- Battle of Urmia (1604)
- Battle of Kircholm (1605)
- Battle of Prostki (1656)
- Battle of Musgrove Mill (1780)
- Battle of Cowpens (1781)
- Battle of Rạch Gầm-Xoài Mút (1785)
- Battle of Castiglione (1796)
- Battle of Delhi (1803)
- Battle of Austerlitz (1805)
- Battle of San Lorenzo island (1837)
- Fetterman Fight (1866)
- Battle of Kasserine Pass (1943)

== See also ==
- List of military tactics
- Hit-and-run tactics
- Sigurd Snake-in-the-Eye (Viking, mid-9th century CE)
