= Ammar ibn Ali al-Kalbi =

- Allegiance: Fatimid Caliphate
- Conflicts: Arab-Byzantine Wars: Siege of Naples

ʿAmmar ibn ʿAlī ibn Abī al-Ḥusayn al-Kalbī (Arabic: عمار بن علي بن أبي الحسين الكلبي) was a member of the Kalbid family and a military commander for the Fatimid Caliphate in its wars with the Byzantine Empire in Sicily and southern Italy in the 950s.

== Biography ==
As evidenced by his nisba, Ammar hailed from the Arab Banu Kalb tribe, and belonged to an aristocratic family established in Ifriqiya since the Muslim conquest of the Maghreb. The family had evidently embraced the Fatimid regime after the overthrow of the Aghlabids in 909, and his father Ali had served the Fatimids with distinction, being killed by the rebellious populace in Agrigento in 938. Along with his brother Hasan, Ammar belonged to the close circle around Jawdhar, the powerful chamberlain and chief minister of Caliph al-Mansur bi-Nasr Allah.

In spring or early summer 956, Caliph al-Mu'izz dispatched him to Sicily at the head of a fleet, to confront the Byzantines. Ammar inflicted a heavy defeat on the Byzantine fleet, and the Fatimids under Ammar's brother Hasan and Jawhar al-Siqilli scored further victories and raided Calabria. The local Byzantine commander, Marianos Argyros, visited the caliphal court and arranged for truce, but it was soon broken and warfare resumed. In spring 957, Ammar crossed from Sicily to Calabria, but the Fatimids themselves suffered heavy losses in a storm. Another effort by Argyros to renew the truce in autumn failed, and in the next year, Ammar and Hasan defeated his forces in Sicily; but soon after, as the Fatimid fleet was returning from Calabria to Sicily, it was again wrecked in a storm off Palermo, in which Ammar perished (on 24 September 958, according to the Cambridge Chronicle; al-Maqrizi places these events two years earlier). As a result, al-Mu'izz accepted new Byzantine proposals for a renewed five-year truce. Ammar's body was recovered among the wreckage, and buried by his brother Hasan in Sicily.

Ammar's son Hasan also served against the Byzantines in Sicily and Italy before going to newly conquered Egypt, where he rose to become chief minister under Caliph al-Hakim bi-Amr Allah in 996–997, before being overthrown and executed by Bajarwan.

== Sources ==
- Brett, Michael (2001). The Rise of the Fatimids: The World of the Mediterranean and the Middle East in the Fourth Century of the Hijra, Tenth Century CE. The Medieval Mediterranean. Vol. 30. Leiden: BRILL. ISBN 9004117415.
- Daftary, Farhad (2007). The Ismāʿı̄lı̄s: Their History and Doctrines (Second ed.). Cambridge: Cambridge University Press. ISBN 978-0-521-61636-2.
- Halm, Heinz (1996). The Empire of the Mahdi: The Rise of the Fatimids. Handbook of Oriental Studies. Vol. 26. transl. by Michael Bonner. Leiden: BRILL. ISBN 9004100563.
- Lilie, Ralph-Johannes; Ludwig, Claudia; Pratsch, Thomas; Zielke, Beate (2013). Prosopographie der mittelbyzantinischen Zeit Online. Berlin-Brandenburgische Akademie der Wissenschaften. Nach Vorarbeiten F. Winkelmanns erstellt (in German). Berlin and Boston: De Gruyter.
