= Siege of Ganja (1606) =

- Part of the Ottoman–Safavid War of 1603–1618
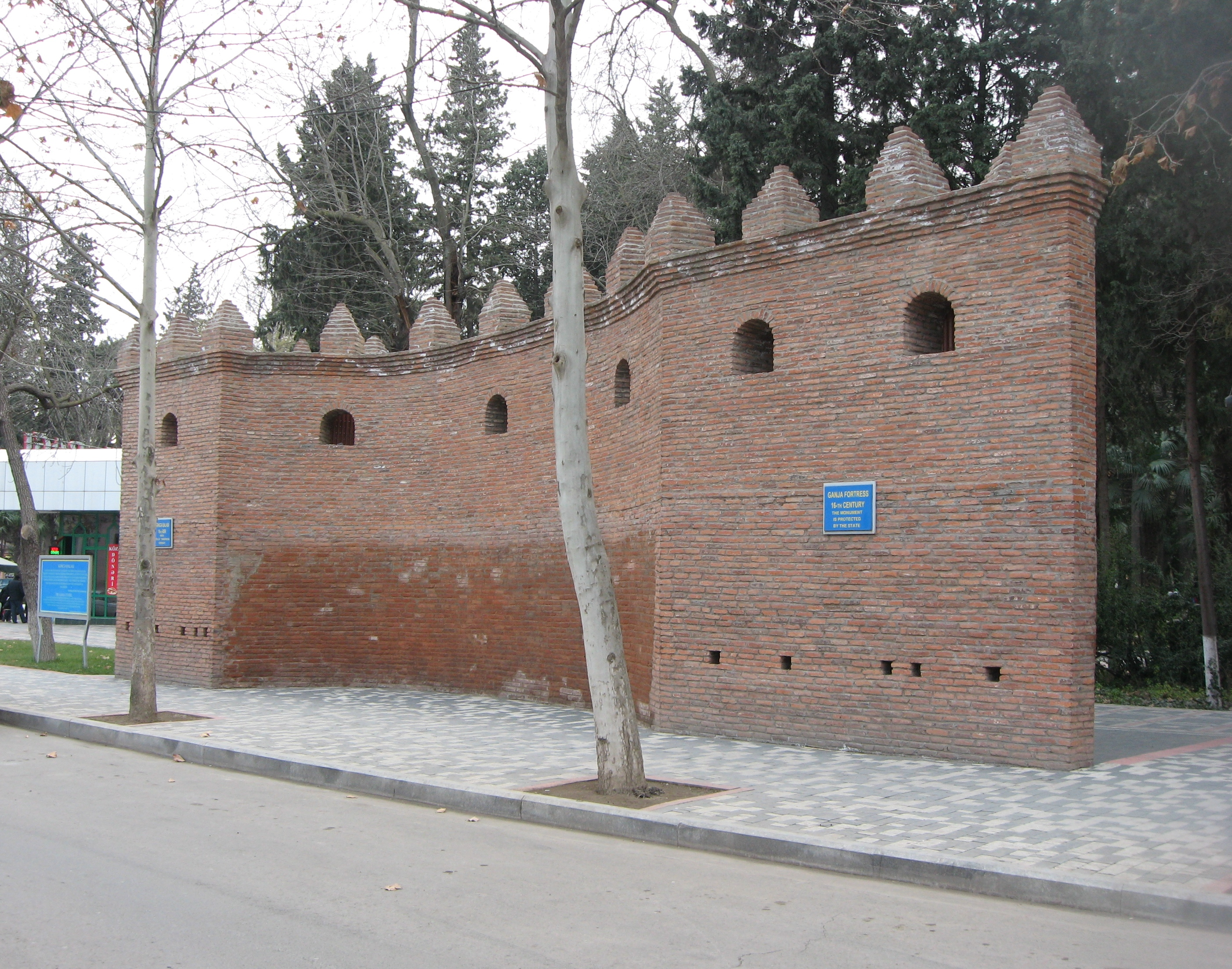
- Ganja fortress from the 16th century
Date	1606
Location	Ganja 40.6827°N 46.3605°E
Result	Safavid victory
Territorial changes	Safavid recapture of the city

Belligerents
Safavid Iran	Ottoman Empire

Commanders and leaders
(Safavid Iran) Abbas the Great	(Ottoman Empire) Mehmed Pasha (executed)

Casualties and losses
Unknown	2,500 killed
- Up to 2,500 civilians slaughtered by Safavids

The siege of Ganja (Persian: محاصره گنجه) took place in 1606 during the Ottoman–Safavid War of 1603–1618. The Safavids had lost the city to the Ottomans by the Treaty of Constantinople of 1590. Three months after the victorious Battle of Sufiyan (1605), Safavid king (shah) Abbas I of Persia (r. 1588–1629) invested Ganja, and reconquered it after a six-month siege. After Ganja was recaptured, Abbas I and his men proceeded to Tiflis (Tbilisi), retaking control of the city in the same year.

== Sources ==
- Blow, David (2009). Shah Abbas: The Ruthless King Who became an Iranian Legend. London, UK: I. B. Tauris & Co. Ltd. p. 20. ISBN 978-1845119898. LCCN 2009464064.
- Bosworth, C. Edmund (2000). "GANJA". Encyclopædia Iranica, Vol. X, Fasc. 3. pp. 282–283.
- Floor, Willem M. (2008). Titles and Emoluments in Safavid Iran: A Third Manual of Safavid Administration, by Mirza Naqi Nasiri. Washington, DC: Mage Publishers. ISBN 978-1933823232.
- Farrokh, Kaveh (20 December 2011). Iran at War: 1500-1988. Bloomsbury Publishing. ISBN 978-1-78096-240-5.
