= Safavid capture of Tabriz (1603) =

1603 battle between the Ottoman Empire and Safavid Iran

Capture of Tabriz (1603)
- Part of the Ottoman–Safavid War (1603–1612)
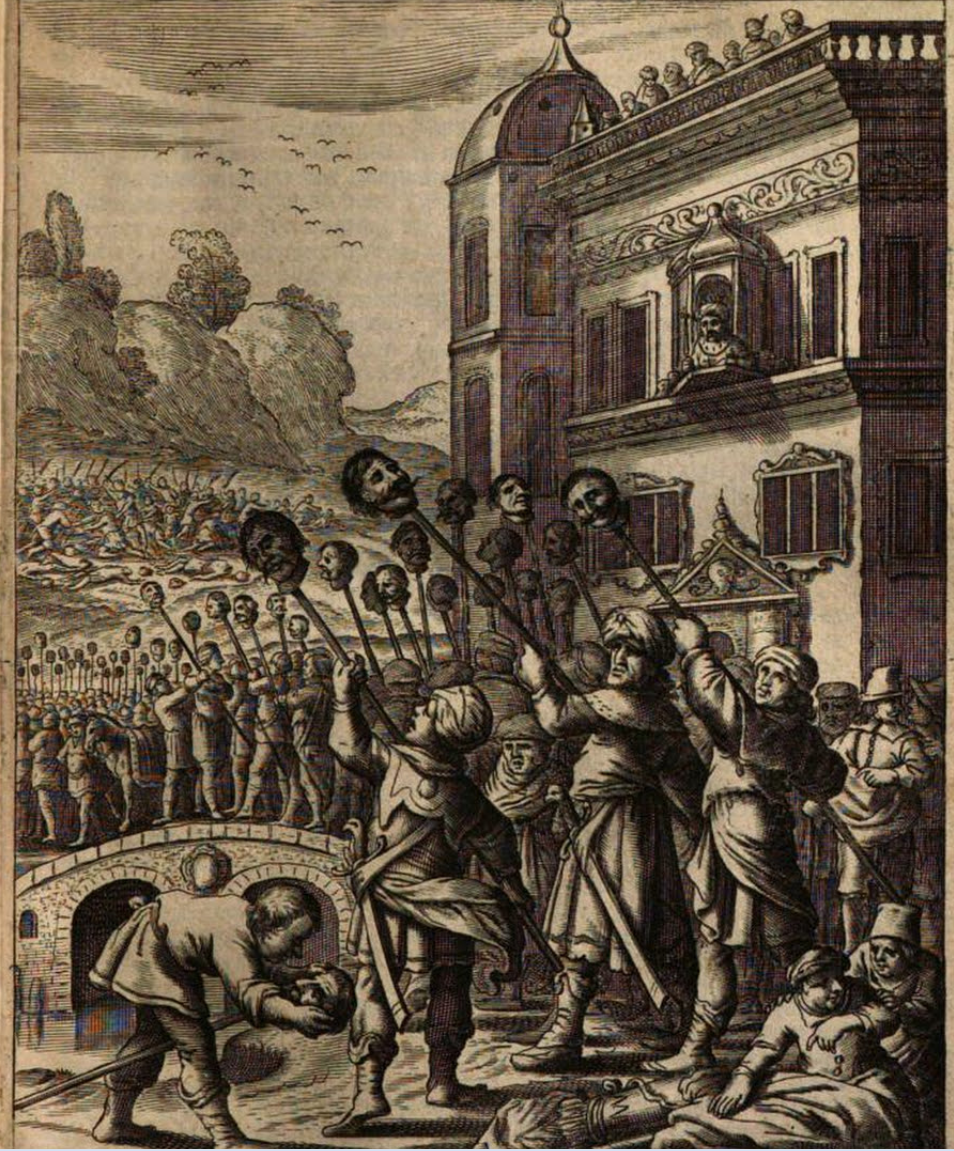
- The locals of Tabriz welcoming the Safavid army, with heads of the Ottomans mounted on their spear. Made by Pietro Della Valle, published in 1671
Date	October 21, 1603
Location	Tabriz, Iran
Result	Safavid victory
Territorial changes	Safavids re-capture Tabriz from Ottomans.

Belligerents
Safavid Iran	Ottoman Empire

Commanders and leaders
(Safavid Iran) Shah Abbas I	(Ottoman Empire) Ali Pasha

Strength
(Safavid Iran) 120,000	Unknown

The siege of Tabriz (Persian: فتح تبریز) was a military conflict during the Ottoman–Safavid war of 1603–1612. As a result of a successful Persian siege initiated by Shah Abbas the Great, Tabriz was returned to the Safavids after 18 years of Ottoman rule.

== Background and prelude ==
The previous Ottoman–Safavid War of 1578–1590 had ended with Shah Abbas I being forced to cede their possessions in the Southern Caucasus and western Iran to the Ottomans. The Ottomans began to treat their control of Tabriz seriously from that point on. The Ottoman historian Evliya Çelebi mentions the numerous buildings they had constructed in Tabriz and the surrounding area, particularly that of the governor, Ja'far Pasha. However, the Iranians were closely monitoring their former capital.

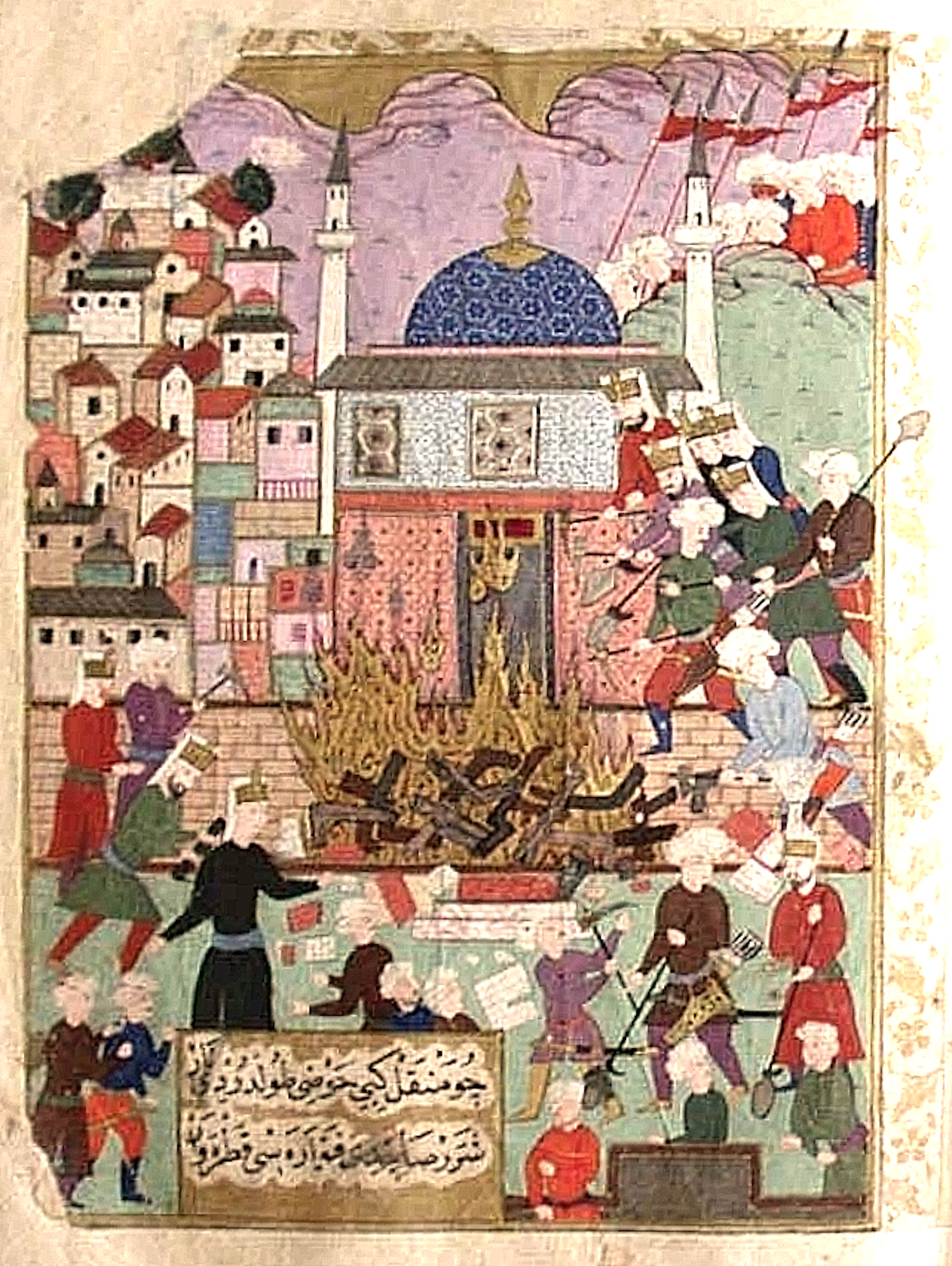
Capture of Tabriz in 1618 by the Ottomans under Damat Halil Pasha. Şehname-i Nadiri (Nadiri's book of kings) (1620s)

In 1602, with the eastern front at least temporarily stabilized and internal stability reestablished, Shah Abbas's focused on regaining Azerbaijan and Shirvan, two of the most significant provinces that the Ottomans had gained. His advisors had always emphasized the strength of the Ottoman sultans and the size of their troops whenever he had brought up the prospect of regaining his lost land. In September 1603, Shah Abbas attacked the Ottomans, thus initiating the Ottoman–Safavid War of 1603–1618.

Shah Abbas benefited greatly from the timing of the war. Despite his defeat at Balkh, the Uzbek threat had ended for the time being, and his authority was no longer in question within Iran. On the other hand, war and internal uprisings significantly had damaged the Ottoman Empire. The Ottoman army had been fighting the Austrians in Hungary for the last ten years in a persistent cycle of sieges and battles. Large-scale uprisings in Ottoman Anatolia had been sparked by discontent with the war and worsening economic conditions, and they persisted practically nonstop from 1596 to 1608. As soon as one insurrection was put down, another one started. Abbas first destroyed the Ottoman fortress at Nahavand, which they used as a staging area for upcoming attacks into Iran.

== Capture of Tabriz ==
In the meantime, chieftain Ghazi Beg had rebelled against Ali Pasha, the Ottoman governor of Tabriz. The latter left the city largely undefended when he took a large number of his forces to punish Ghazi Beg, who had made a secret alliance with Shah Abbas and quickly informed him of this. Shah Abbas gathered the available soldiers, but hid his true motives by promoting the rumor that he was going south to thwart a Portuguese assault on Bahrain. On 14 September 1603, he quickly marched to the city of Qazvin. He stopped for a moment, then continued toward Tabriz, instructing the governor of Ardabil and darugha (constable) of Qazvin to reinforce him.

The Ottoman soldiers in Tabriz was caught off guard by Shah Abbas. When he arrived in the city, several of them were already shopping at the market. Since Tabriz, like many other Iranian cities, had no protective wall surrounding it, conquering it was an easy task now that there was no Ottoman force to fight him.

== Sources ==
- Blow, David (2009). Shah Abbas: The Ruthless King Who Became an Iranian Legend. I. B. Tauris. ISBN 978-1-84511-989-8. LCCN 2009464064.
- Minorsky, Vladimir & Bosworth, C.E. (2000). "Tabrīz". In Bearman, P. J.; Bianquis, Th.; Bosworth, C. E.; van Donzel, E. & Heinrichs, W. P. (eds.). The Encyclopaedia of Islam, Second Edition. Volume X: T–U. Leiden: E. J. Brill. ISBN 978-90-04-11211-7.
- Savory, Roger M. (2007). Iran Under the Safavids. Cambridge University Press. ISBN 978-0521042512.
