= Battle of Beroia (1187) =

1187 battle

- Part of the Byzantine–Bulgarian wars
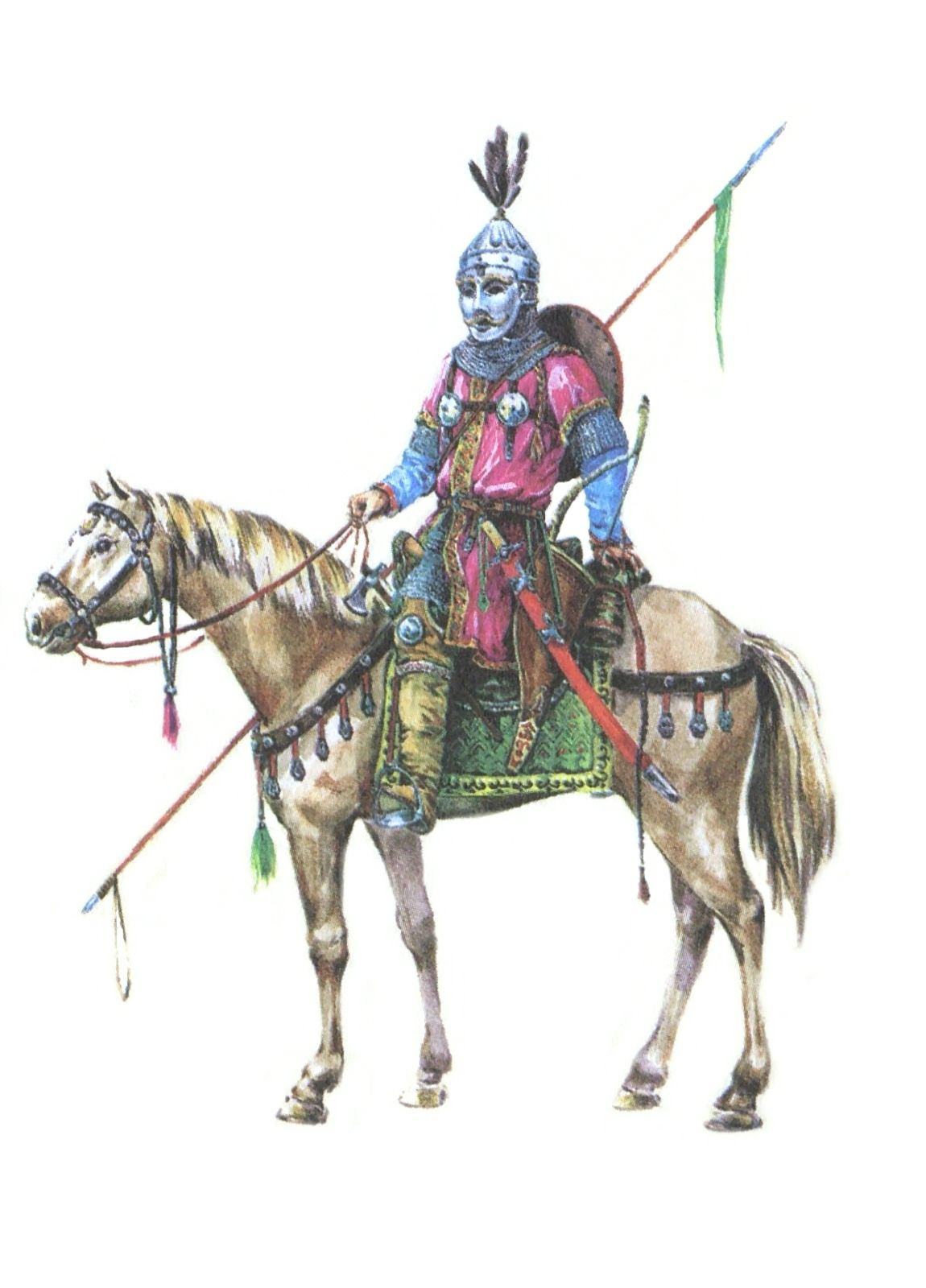
- Rendition of a Cuman warrior
| Date | October 11, 1187 |
| Location | Stara Zagora, modern Bulgaria |
| Result | Byzantine victory |

Belligerents
| Bulgarian Empire; Cumans (Note: Bulgarians and Vlachs had been living amicable in Moesia and Macedonia, where the Bulgarians were the largest element of the population. Both have similar grievances against the Byzantines and acted jointly. The Bulgarian–Vlach–Cuman uprising produced a state that called itself Bulgaria and both Bulgarians and Vlachs belonged to the revived Bulgarian Orthodox Church.) | Byzantine Empire |

Commanders and leaders
| Unknown | Isaac II Angelos |

Strength
| 6,000–7,000 | 2,000 |

Casualties and losses
| Very heavy | Heavy |

The Battle of Beroia or Battle of Lardeas was an engagement fought by the Byzantine Emperor Isaac II Angelos against forces of the Bulgarian Empire, comprised mostly of Cumans, on 11 October 1187, in the region between Basternai and Beroia. Having launched an offensive against the rebel Bulgarian forces of the Asen brothers Ivan and Peter — who were fighting to liberate the country after almost two centuries of Byzantine rule — Isaac intercepted a mostly Cuman force as it returned from a destructive raid into Byzantine territory. In the battle, the numerically superior and more mobile Cuman forces initially gained the upper hand against the Byzantines, but the personal intervention of Emperor Isaac with his bodyguards restored the situation. In a rapid attack, Isaac routed the Cuman–Bulgarian–Vlach host, inflicting severe casualties upon his opponents. Although the Byzantine army emerged victorious, the presence of separate Bulgarian, Vlach and Cuman raiding columns prevented them from fully exploiting the victory, and forced Isaac to conduct a further offensive in 1188, which ended in failure.

== Background ==
In 1186, the Byzantine forces under Isaac II Angelos conducted a successful campaign against the rebel Bulgarian–Vlach forces under the Asen brothers Ivan and Peter. Following their defeat, the rebels were forced to seek aid from the Cumans across the Danube, whom they successfully persuaded to their side. The Cuman forces that assembled included not only those who inhabited the northern bank of the Danube, but likely also nomads from the Pontic Steppe, near the lands of Rus'. (Note: The Galician–Volhynian Chronicle records for the year 1187 a Campaign by the armies Grand Prince of Kiev, Sviatoslav III, in which Sviatoslav's Black Klobuks attacked and captured several Cuman settlements East of the Dnieper. The Kievan success in this offensive may have been aided by the absence of large numbers of Cuman warriors that were engaging the Byzantines in the Balkans at the time.) The combined strength of the Bulgarians, Vlachs and Cumans may have exceeded 40,000 warriors during this period, and thus once the allied forces again crossed the Danube to Moesia they spread out to raid over a large area and inflicted widespread devastation on Byzantine holdings.

Between late 1186 and March 1187, the Byzantines campaigned under three separate generals against the renewed attacks of the rebels and their Cuman allies. The first of these was conducted by Sebastokrator John Angelos Doukas, the uncle of the emperor, who gained victories in pitched battles against the Cuman-rebel forces when the latter descended into open plains. However, John Angelos Doukas' military successes caused the emperor to become suspicious that he would plot to usurp the throne, and consequently Doukas was dismissed from his command and replaced with Caesar John Kantakouzenos. Kantakouzenos resumed the offensive against the rebels, who opted to avoid open battles and instead conduct warfare in the mountains. Kantakouzenos advanced into this terrain in pursuit, but neglected to fortify his camp during the nights. The rebel forces exploited this to conduct a night attack against the Byzantines, and heavily defeated them. The rebels and Cumans exploited their success to raid the plains once again.

After the defeat, John Kantakouzenos was dismissed and replaced with Alexios Branas. Branas successfully drove them back into the mountains after a number of engagements, before launching a cautious offensive in pursuit, marching slowly to avoid ambushes and minimizing the casualties amongst his own army. He was able to foil all attempted attacks by the Bulgarians, and established a fortified camp in the mountains. However, before further operations could be launched against the rebels, Branas resolved to act upon his long-held desire to depose Isaac and seize the Byzantine throne for himself. In April 1187, he converted the troops to help him march on Constantinople. Alexios Branas conducted a siege of the capital until September, when Isaac's forces sallied out, defeated, and killed him. (Note: One of the commanders of Alexios Branas' defeated army was of Cuman origin, a man named Alpamysh (called Elpumes the Scythian by Niketas Choniates).)

== Campaign and Battle of Beroia ==
In October 1187, soon after the defeat of Branas, the Emperor Isaac prepared and armed a select force of 2,000 elite cavalry to conduct a renewed expedition against the Cumans. He set out to Adrianople, where he deposited his baggage train and camp followers before continuing. Niketas Choniates accompanied the Byzantine army during this offensive, and detailed the events in his later works. Soon after leaving Adrianople, Byzantine scouts reported to the emperor that a Cuman force was raiding the vicinity of Lardea, where they killed many citizens and took numerous others as captives. Isaac hastily led his men out on a night march to intercept the enemy and on 7 October he arrived at Basternai. However, as his force failed to encounter the enemy he rested his men at this locale for 3 days. On 11 October, he began to journey on to Beroia, but en route a Byzantine cavalryman arrived to inform the emperor that a force of around 6,000 was returning from a raid with many spoils and up to 12,000 captives.

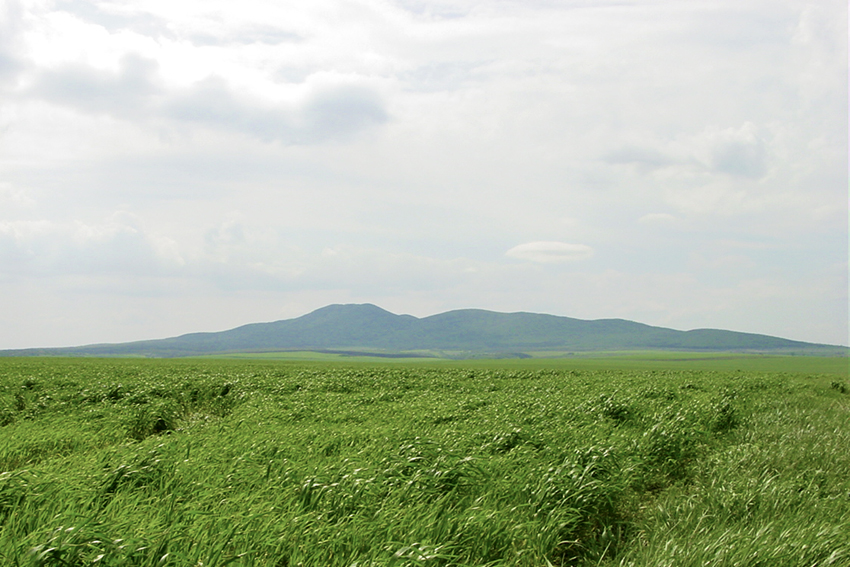
Modern view of the province of Yambol, near the route from Thrace to Lardea, with tbe Manastirski Heights visible in the background

Receiving news of this, Isaac quickly drew his men into a battle array under his subcommanders and marched against the Cumans. Upon witnessing the approach of the Byzantine cavalry, the Bulgarians, Vlachs and Cumans delegated a contingent of their force to continue transporting the spoils back towards the mountains, while the majority formed up to meet the Byzantines in combat. The Cumans began the battle with attacks by lancers, javelinmen and horse archers, after which they feigned retreat to lure the Byzantines into pursuit. When they had retreated a certain distance, the Cumans wheeled about and engaged the Byzantines again with renewed vigour. Over the course of the battle, the Cumans repeated these tactics until, after receiving 1,000 reinforcements, they fully committed to the combat, drawing their sabres and charging with loud war cries.

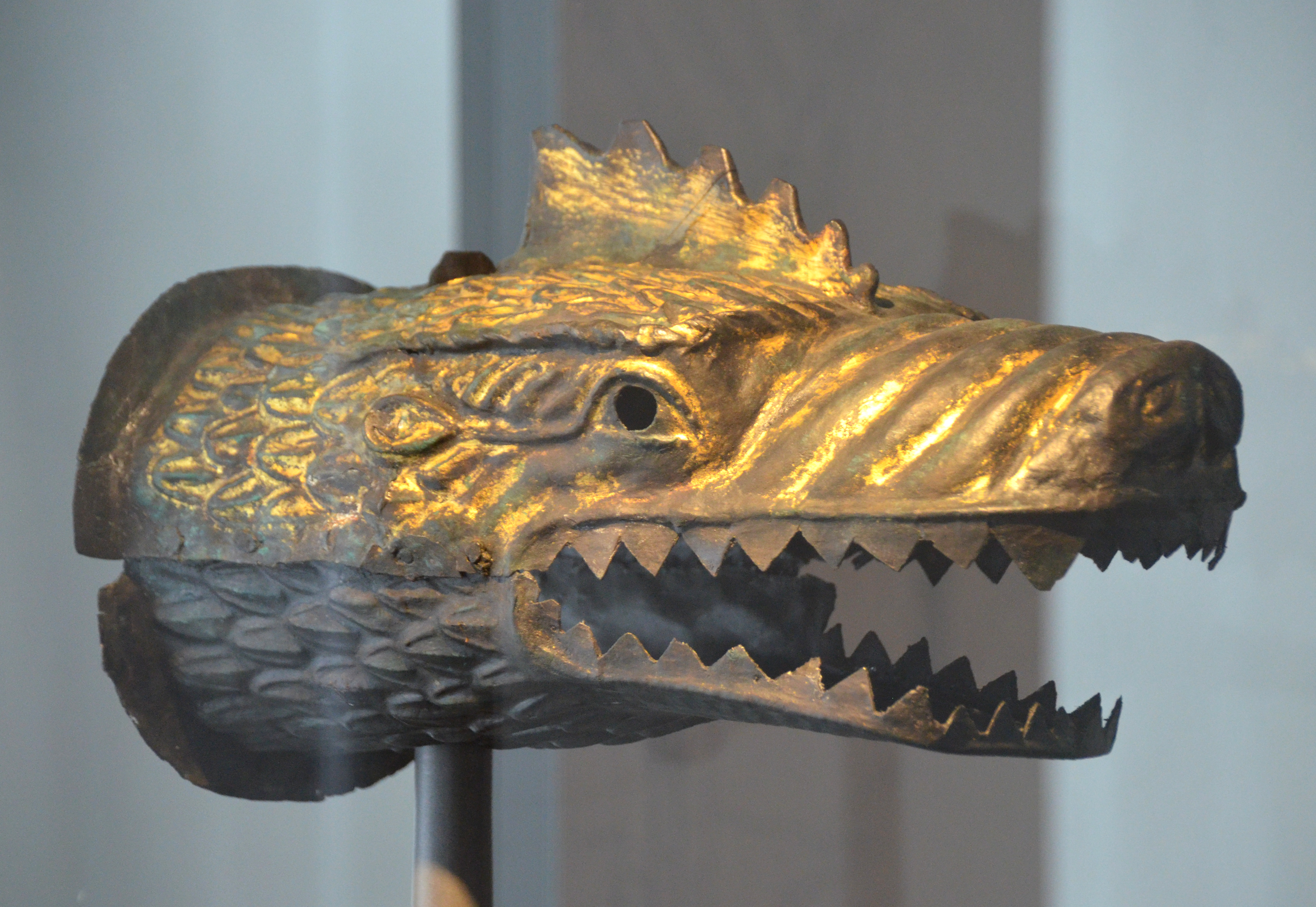
Surviving head of a Roman Draco standard from Niederbieber. A similar type of standard was used against the Cumans by Isaac II Angelos at the Battle of Beroia

Having pressed their attack, the Cumans began to gain the upper hand against the outnumbered Byzantines force, inflicting significant casualties. However, at that juncture the emperor personally entered combat with the small bodyguard unit he had kept in reserve. The Byzantines uttered loud battle chants and bashed their shields while flying their dragon standards. The display demoralized the Cumans. Unable to oppose the reinvigorated Byzantine attack and believing the emperor's force to be far larger than it actually was, the Cumans routed, but the fresh cavalrymen conducted a close pursuit of the nomads. Large numbers of Cumans were caught and killed, and the Byzantines were on the point of annihilating the whole enemy force until the arrival of nightfall put a stop to the chase, allowing the remnants to escape. As a result of his victory, Isaac captured the Cuman–Vlach camp and managed to recover some of the captives and loot taken during previous raids.

== Aftermath ==
Despite the defeat, the Bulgarians, Vlachs and Cumans changed strategy, opting to avoid open battles with the Byzantines and instead separate their columns to raid several areas simultaneously. While returning to Adrianople after his victory, Isaac was forced to march back to Beroia and then to Agathopolis, in order to counter the rebel forces. Soon after he turned towards Philippopolis to relieve the city from raids by Ivan Asen. Thereafter, he marched to Sofia in December, as he hoped to advance from there against Bulgarian strongholds in the Haemus, but the onset of heavy snow caused him to postpone this offensive until the following year. He consequently encamped most of his army in the area, and withdrew to Constantinople with a retinue of light cavalry for the winter. When the offensive was then launched in 1188, the Byzantines unsuccessfully besieged Lovech fortress, but they managed to capture the wife of Ivan Asen, which provided them some limited leverage to begin negotiations for a truce. However, the treaty was polotically advantageous to the Bulgarians as it effectively recognized the independence of the reborn Bulgarian state. (Note: In December 1189, Peter Asen offered the Holy Roman Emperor, Frederick Barbarossa, 40,000 men to assist him in attacking Constantinople. This was done at a time when tensions flared between the German Crusaders and the Byzantine Emperor Isaac II. Barbarossa however declined the offer.)

== Bibliography ==
=== Primary sources ===
- Choniates, Niketas (1984). Historia. English translation: Magoulias, Harry J. (O City of Byzantium: Annals of Niketas Choniates). Detroit. ISBN 0-8143-1764-2.

=== Secondary sources ===
- Brand, Charles M. (1968). Byzantium Confronts the West, 1180–1204. Cambridge, Massachusetts: Harvard University Press. LCCN 67-20872.
- Fine, J. (1987). The Late Medieval Balkans, A Critical Survey from the Late Twelfth Century to the Ottoman Conquest. University of Michigan Press. ISBN 0-472-10079-3.
- Madgearu, Alexandru (2016). The Asanids: The Political and Military History of the Second Bulgarian Empire, 1185–1280. BRILL. p. 153. ISBN 978-9-004-32501-2.
- Kaldellis, Anthony (2023). The New Roman Empire: A History of Byzantium. New York: Oxford University Press. ISBN 978-0197549322.
- Dall'Aglio, Francesco (2008–2009). "The Military Alliance between the Cumans and Bulgaria from the Establishment of the Second Bulgarian Kingdom to the Mongol Invasion". Archivum Eurasiae Medii Aevi. 16.
- Vásáry, István (2005). Cumans and Tatars: Oriental Military in the Pre-Ottoman Balkans, 1185–1365. Cambridge: Cambridge University Press. ISBN 0521837561.
- Spinei, Victor (2009). The Romanians and the Turkic Nomads North of the Danube Delta from the Tenth to the Mid-Thirteenth Century. East Central and Eastern Europe in the Middle Ages, 450–1450. Vol. 6. Leiden: Brill.
