= Hungarian invasions of Thrace =

Magyar invasions of Thrace
- Part of the Hungarian invasions
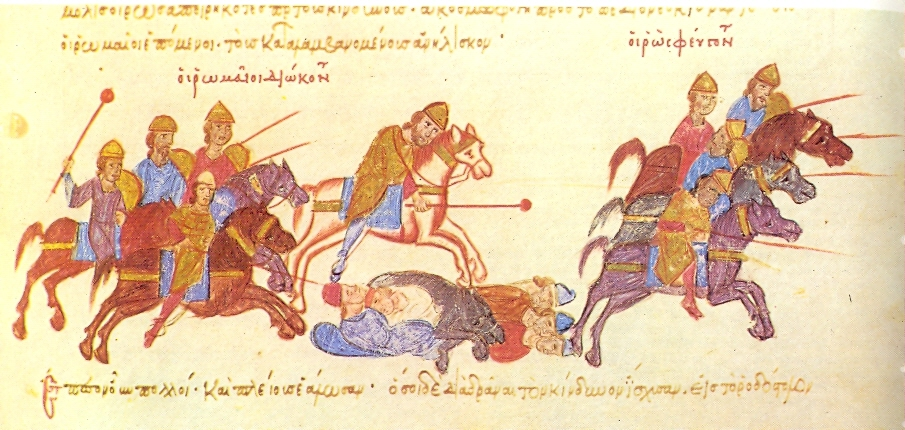
- Byzantine troops engage enemy horsemen in 970, among whom were Magyar horsemen
Date	959–961 (Magyar invasions); 961–970 (Magyar raids)
Location	Main engagements in Thrace, spillover in Macedonia, Thessalonica & Bulgaria
Result	Byzantine victory
Territorial changes	End of the Hungarian invasions of Europe

Belligerents
Byzantine Empire	Magyar tribes Principality of Hungary; Supported by (in 970): Kievan Rus; Pechenegs; Tsardom of Bulgaria	Tsardom of Bulgaria

Commanders and leaders
Pothos Argyros; Leo Phokas the Younger; Marianos Argyros; Peter stratopedarches Nikephoros II Phokas; Bardas Skleros	Unknown	Peter I Boris II

Strength
959: 24,000 (paper strength); 960: 7,000–8,000	960 & 961: Greater than the Byzantines	Unknown

Casualties and losses
Unknown	Heavy	Unknown

The Hungarian (Magyar) invasions of Thrace were a series of three consecutive invasions into Byzantine Thrace by large Magyar armies, during the reigns of Emperors Constantine VII and Romanos II, occurring annually from 959 to 961. The Byzantine armies met and repulsed each of these, though smaller attacks on Thrace by bands of Magyars continued for the following years until 970.

== Background ==
Due to their diplomatic reach, the Byzantines had long been aware of nomadic populations identifiable as the Magyars. These peoples are listed in the De Administrando Imperio of Constantine VII Porphyrogenitus under the names Kabaroi and Tourkoi, who inhabited a region known as Tourkia, before they were forced out of these lands by another nomadic people, the Pechenegs, and as a result migrated to settle in the Carpathian Basin. From there, the Magyars initiated their invasions. The military forces fielded by the Magyars were detailed by Leo the Wise in his Taktika, which described their organisation and tactics in warfare, along with means by which Byzantine armies could counter them.

The Magyar attacks first reached Byzantine territory in 934, alongside Pecheneg contingents, after a failed bid by the Byzantines to militarily support Bulgarian resistance against the nomads. The Magyars again attacked the region in 943, and on this occasion extracted a tribute from Constantinople. A semi-legendary account from the 14th century Chronicon Pictum recounts the triumph of a Magyar warrior in single-combat against a Greek outside Constantinople, under promise of payment should the Hungarian succeed, only for the emperor behind the walls to betray this promise by withholding said payment. (Note: Syvänne(p. 197) connects this retelling with the raid in 959 instead, as Byzantine sources attest to a Magyar advance to Constantinople around then) This may represent a recollection of the raids in either 934 or 943, indicating a possible Hungarian advance as far as the Theodosian Walls.

After 943, Magyar attacks against Byzantium subsided for a period as diplomacy prevailed, including efforts by the Byzantines to convert the nomads to Orthodox Christianity. In 948, the Byzantines managed to convert a Magyar chieftain of the Karhas clan, named Boultzous, with the Emperor Constantine Porphyrogenitus becoming Boultzous' godfather following the baptism. This feat was repeated in 952 with a chieftain of the Gylas clan. Both Boultzous and the other chieftain were given the title of Patrikios. The conversion of leaders from these subordinate tribes may also mark attempts by Byzantium to cause rifts between them and the ruling Magyar tribe, the Arpad, and nullify the threat they posed through internal division. Trade routes between the clans and the Byzantines also expanded during the relative peace of 943-959.

Magyar hostilities toward Byzantium reignited in the mid 10th century, resulting in larger scale-warfare in the region. The years following the Hungarian defeat against the Germans, at the Battle of Lechfeld in 955, saw an Eastward shift in the direction of Magyar raids, towards the Haemus. The lucrative territories of the Byzantine Empire in Thrace and its surroundings consequently became targets for the Magyars.

== Warfare in Thrace ==
=== First invasion ===
In 959, a large Hungarian army crossed the Danube and marched into Thrace. The Magyars devastated the land and took great quantities of loot and captives from the local settlements. However, when they reached the vicinity of Constantinople, a substantial Byzantine army, led by Patrikios Pothos Argyros, marched out against them. The opposing forces met in a nocturnal battle, in which the Magyars were defeated and forced to abandon most of their loot and captives. The surviving Hungarians retreated to their country.

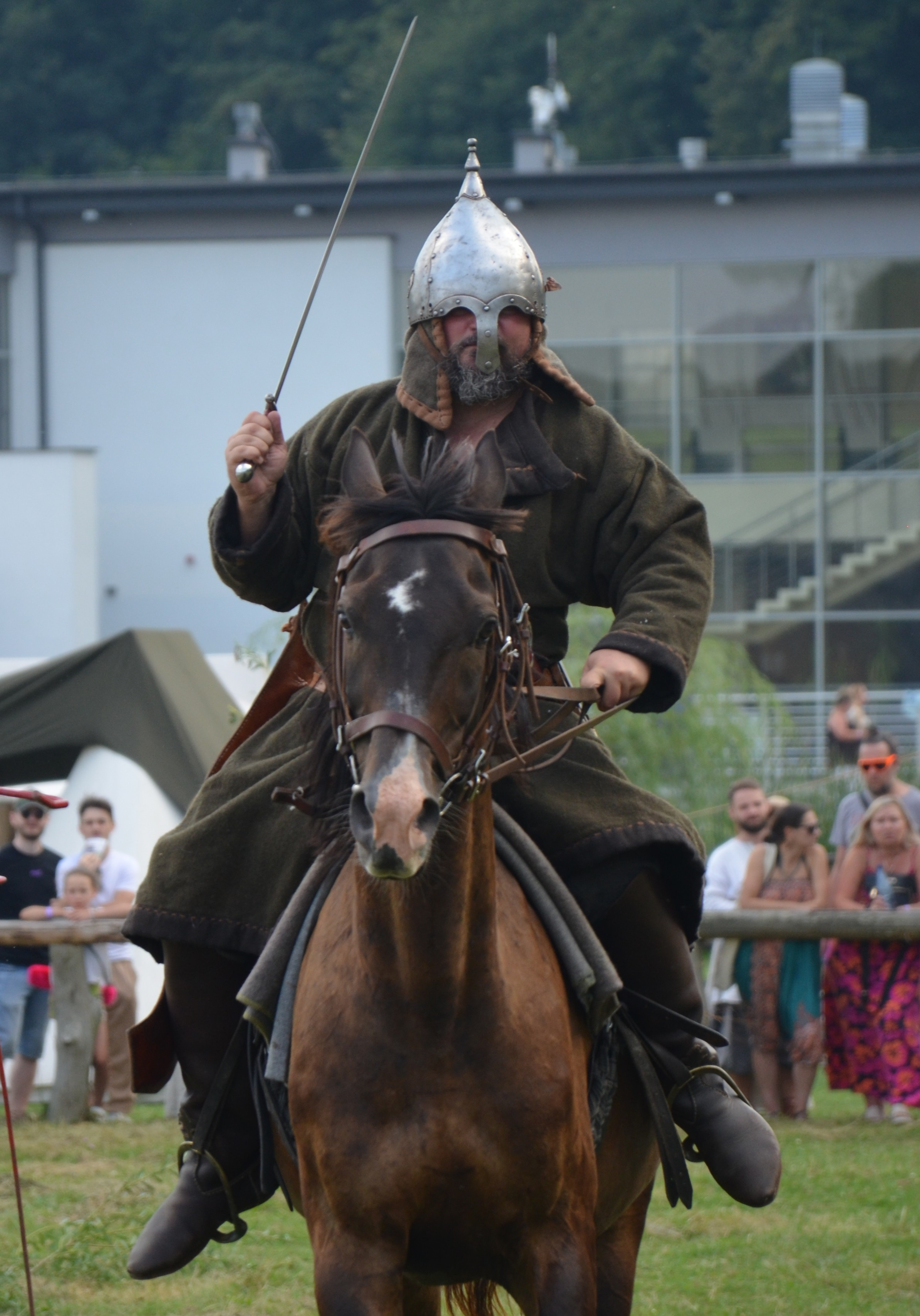
Reenactment of a Magyar horseman

=== Second invasion ===
In 960, the Magyars renewed their large-scale attacks by crossing the Danube with a large force and advancing into Thrace. With Byzantine forces concentrated on the Eastern frontier and the ongoing operation to recapture Crete, the local forces in Thrace, under the Domestikos Leo Phokas, found themselves outnumbered, with no more than 8,000 men available. Unwilling to confront the larger nomadic force directly, the Byzantines shadowed the enemy, anachronistically referred to as Huns by Leo the Deacon, until an opportunity presented itself. In an engagement at night, the Byzantines surrounded the Magyar camp, attacked it from three sides, and defeated their enemy.

Leo the Deacon claimed that the Magyar host was annihilated, but this may be an exaggeration, as the Magyars were able to renew their attack into Byzantine territory with a large army the following year. The need to transfer forces eastwards to meet the invasion of the eastern themes by the Hamdanid army of Sayf al-Dawla may have prevented Leo from conducting an effective pursuit of the Magyars. However, Leo's men gained experience and morale from their success against the nomads, possibly contributing to their victory at the battle of Andrassos in 960.

=== Third invasion ===
In 961, the Magyars launched another major attack into Thrace, but were checked by the Byzantine forces under the governor of Macedonia, Marianos Argyros. The Byzantines met the Magyars in a pitched battle and inflicted a crushing defeat upon them. The western armies under Argyros may have been bolstered by forces returning from the Cretan campaign before they achieved this victory, but the Magyars still enjoyed a numerical advantage, as a number of the Balkan thematic units Leo Phokas had transferred to the east in 960 were still serving there under him in 961. Having suffered massive losses, the remnants of the Magyar army were forced to retire to their country.

== Further incursions ==
=== Further raids ===
Following the defeat in 961, the Magyars ceased their attacks against Byzantium with large-scale raiding forces. However, the threat from them did not end altogether; with the use of large armies having failed them, the Magyars turned to the use of smaller contingents to raid multiple points of Byzantine territory. A description of the nature of this warfare was provided by the bishop of Cremona, Liudprand, who visited Constantinople in 968. On one occasion a band of 300 Magyars pillaged Thessalonica, enslaving 500 local townsfolk and transporting them to Hungary. In another raid, a Magyar detachment of 200 warriors was defeated by Byzantine forces in Macedonia, with 40 of the raiders taken prisoner. Due to their fearsome reputation as cavalry warriors, these men were enrolled as bodyguards of Emperor Nikephoros Phokas, and participated in his offensives against the Muslims. Despite the difficulty of catching the swift-moving raiders, resistance from local military forces remained formidable, as in 967 or 968, Peter stratopedarches caught and defeated another Magyar warband in Thrace, slaying its chieftain in single combat, according to Leo the Deacon.

=== Nikephoros II's Bulgarian Campaign ===
In the winter of 966-967, a Bulgarian delegation travelled to Constantinople and requested customary tribute from the Byzantines. Due to the inability of the forces of Tsar Peter to prevent Magyar warbands crossing through Bulgarian territory to raid Byzantine Thrace (or perhaps the intentional tolerance of this practice), this request was perceived as an insult and enraged Nikephoros Phokas so greatly that he organized a punitive campaign against Bulgaria. In 968, the Byzantine armies invaded Bulgarian territory, defeating the forces which opposed them and successfully storming several forts near the border. However, Nikephoros Phokas refrained from crossing the Haemus Mountains to attempt an invasion of the Bulgarian heartlands and engaging the main enemy forces under Peter, as he was hesitant to lead his men into the broken terrain of the mountain passes, where Byzantine armies had suffered several disasters in the past. Thus, Nikephoros retired his army, and for the rest of his reign deployed it in further campaigns against the Muslims in the east.

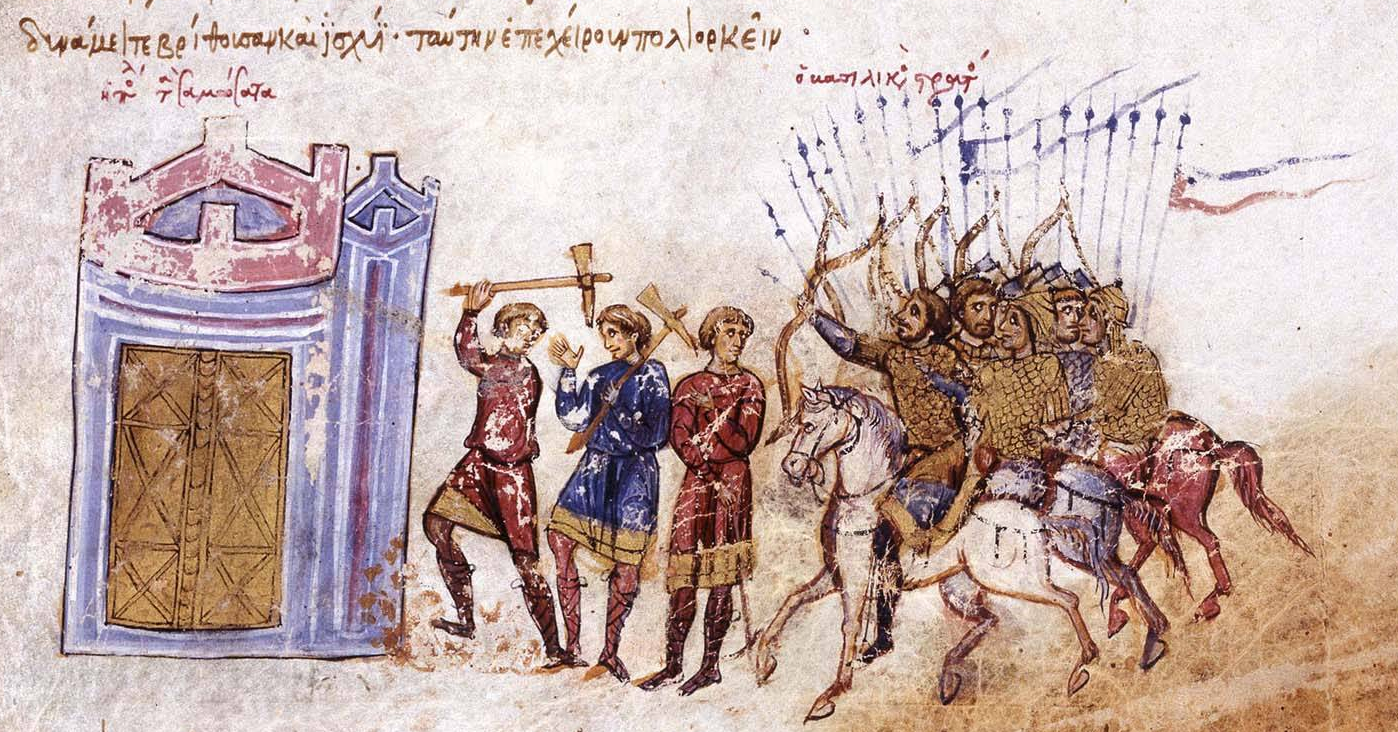
Byzantine soldiers attack a fortress, from the Madrid Skylitzes

=== Rus' intervention and Battle of Arcadiopolis ===
Despite his withdrawal, Nikephoros sought to maintain the pressure with the tried and tested method of inducing another power against the Bulgarians via diplomacy. The choice of ally was Grand Prince Sviatoslav of the Kievan Rus, who invaded Bulgaria in 968 and defeated its armies, resulting in the abdication of Tsar Peter and ascension of Tsar Boris II. However, the Rus subsequently emerged as a greater threat to Byzantine Thrace than the Bulgarians had been.

In 970, Magyar warriors were among the coalition assembled by Sviatoslav in his campaign into Thrace. This invasion would ultimately be defeated by the Byzantines, led by strategos Bardas Skleros, at the battle of Arcadiopolis, an event widely considered to mark the end of the Hungarian invasions.

== Bibliography ==
- Szabó, Pál (2022). "Hungarian-Byzantine relations in the Árpád era". Kings and Saints: The Age of the Árpád. Institute of Hungarian research. ISBN 978-615-6117-65-6.
- Kaldellis, Anthony (2017). Streams of Gold, Rivers of Blood: The Rise and Fall of Byzantium, 955 A.D. to the First Crusade. Oxford University Press. ISBN 978-0190253226.
- Moravcsik, Gyula (1970). Byzantium and the Magyars. Hakkert Publishing.
- Stephenson, Paul (2008). Byzantium's Balkan Frontier: A Political Study of the Northern Balkans, 900-1204. Cambridge University Press. ISBN 978-0190253226.
- Madgearu, Alexandru (2013). Byzantine Military Organization on the Danube, 10th-12th Centuries: 22 (East Central and Eastern Europe in the Middle Ages, 450-1450, 22). Brill. ISBN 978-9004212435.
- Georgios, Theotokis; Tsurtsumia, Mamuka (2025). Nikephoros II Phokas and Warfare in the 10th-Century Byzantine World. Brill. ISBN 978-9004512306.
- Berend, Nora; Laszlovszky, József; Szakács, Béla Zsolt (2007). "The kingdom of Hungary". In Berend, Nora (ed.). Christianization and the Rise of Christian Monarchy: Scandinavia, Central Europe and Rus', c. 900-1200. Cambridge University Press. pp. 319–368. ISBN 978-0-521-87616-2.
- Syvänne, Ilkka (2025). Nikephoros II Phokas, 912–969: The White Death of the Saracens. Pen and Sword. ISBN 978-1399005289.
