= Battle of Urmia (1604) =

Battle between the Ottoman Empire and Safavid Iran

- Part of the Ottoman–Safavid war (1603–1612)
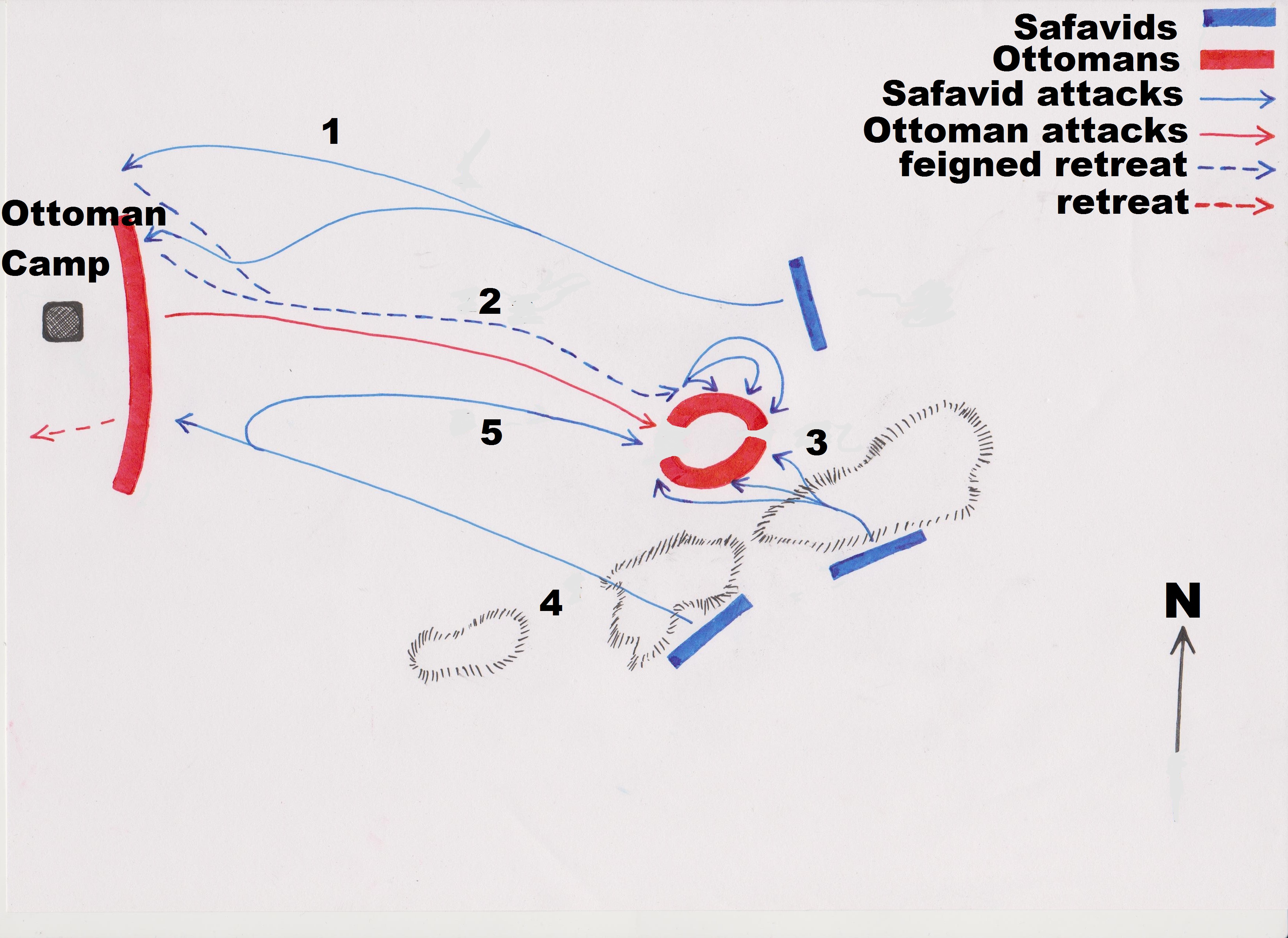
- 1 Allahvardi Khan charges his cavalry at the Ottoman army and assails their flanks aggressively 2 The Ottomans attack and Allahvardi feigns retreat, encouraging the Ottoman general to join the pursuit with a large part of his army 3 Abbas signals his hidden army to march over the hill and fall upon the Ottomans pursuing Allahvardi's forces which turn round and catch the Ottomans in a pincer 4 Another contingent of the hidden Safavid troops marches against the now weakened Ottoman line defending their camp and easily overcomes them 5 Subsequently a portion of the aforementioned group return to seal off the Ottomans in a pocket, killing and imprisoning almost all locked into the trap
Date	1604
Location	Urmia
Result	Safavid victory
Territorial changes	Safavid recovery of Western Iran and capture of Armenia and Georgia

Belligerents
Safavid Empire	Ottoman Empire

Commanders and leaders
Shah Abbas I Allahverdi Khan	Yusuf Sinan Pasha; Safar Pasha (executed)

Strength
~70,000	~90,000

Casualties and losses
Unknown	~20,000 killed

The Battle of Urmia, also Urumiyeh, (Persian: نبرد ارومیه) was fought near Lake Urmia in north-western Iran between the Safavid and Ottoman empires and resulted in a decisive Safavid victory. The Ottomans were fooled into an ambush by the Iranian army where many of them were killed or captured in an encirclement manoeuvre. Over the next three years all of western and northern Iran were recaptured and the Safavids even re-established their suzerainty over their former vassals in the Caucasus.

== Background ==
In 1603, Shah Abbas I of Safavid Iran realised the vulnerability of the Ottoman Empire and undertook a campaign to regain the lost territories of his Empire. His attack in 1603 saw him easily defeating the Ottoman garrisons surrounding Tabriz, following up on the success and effectively punching the Ottoman armies back into a well-fortified Yerevan (capital of modern Armenia) and Eastern Anatolia.

== Battle ==
Shah Abbas I approached with a force of an estimated 62,000 men, while the Ottomans held nearly 100,000 men. The Battle of Urmia, Urumiyeh, or alternatively known as the Battle of Sis, began with Allahverdi Khan's cavalry raid. The Ottoman commanders mistook this raid for the entirety of the Safavid offensive and turned about to give battle to them, leaving their flanks exposed. Seizing the opportunity, the Shah struck the Ottoman line with all the might of his hidden army, and sent a contingent to turn the remaining Ottomans defending the camp away. That Safavid contingent then turned about and sealed the remaining Ottoman units on the field in an encirclement, during which the entrapped Ottoman troops were either killed, injured or captured. It is believed that the Ottomans suffered some 20,000 dead.

== Aftermath ==
With the only force capable of retaking Tabriz now disorderly and effectively routed, the Safavid offensive into the Caucasus was a success. After the defeat of Canbulatoğlu Hüseyin Pasha, Shah Abbas I recaptured Ganja, Baku, Shamakhi and Shirvan.
