= Chronicle of Cambridge =

The Chronicle of Cambridge or Cambridge Chronicle, also known as the Tarʾīkh Jazīrat Ṣiqilliya ("History of the Island of Sicily"), is a short, anonymous medieval chronicle covering the years 827–965. It is the earliest native Sicilian chronicle of the emirate of Sicily, and was written from the perspective of a Sicilian Christian of the 10th or 11th century. It survives in two versions: a Greek version in two manuscripts and an Arabic version in one. For years only the Arabic text kept in Cambridge University Library was known, but in 1890 a Greek redaction was discovered. The Greek texts are found in the Vatican Library and the Bibliothèque nationale de France (Codex Parisinus Graecus 920). It has been translated into English, Italian and French.

== Editions ==
- In Biblioteca arabo-sicula, 2nd revised edition, U. Rizzitano, A. Borruso, M. Cassarino and A. De Simone (eds.), 2 vols and appendix, Palermo 1982. vol. 1, pp. 277–93.
- In Biblioteca arabo-sicula, 2nd revised edition, M. Amari and U. Rizzitano (eds.), 2 vols, Palermo 1987–88. vol. 1, pp. 190–203.
