= Ottoman–Safavid war (1603–1612) =

17th century war between the Ottoman Empire and the Safavid Empire

- Part of Ottoman–Persian Wars
Date	26 September 1603 – 20 November 1612
Location	Western Iran, South Caucasus
Result	Safavid victory
Territorial changes	Safavids regain control over the territories ceded in 1590 to the Ottomans; Azerbaijan, Georgia, Erivan province, Daghestan, Shirvan, Karabakh, Lorestan, and Khuzestan

Belligerents
Safavid Iran; Kingdom of Kartli; Kingdom of Kakheti	Ottoman Empire

Commanders and leaders
(Safavid Iran) Shah Abbas I (Safavid Iran) Allahverdi Khan (Safavid Iran) Giorgi Saakadze (Safavid Iran) Ganj Ali Khan (Safavid Iran) Qarachaqay Khan; George X # Alexander II of Kakheti #	(Ottoman Empire) Ahmed I (Ottoman Empire) Damat Halil Pasha (Ottoman Empire) Cigalazade Yusuf Sinan Pasha # (Ottoman Empire) Kuyucu Murad Pasha # (Ottoman Empire) Nasuh Pasha (Ottoman Empire) Öküz Mehmed Pasha

Strength
Unknown	Unknown

Casualties and losses
Unknown	Unknown

The Ottoman–Safavid war of 1603–1612 consisted of two wars between Safavid Iran under Shah Abbas I and the Ottoman Empire under Mehmed III and his son Ahmed I. The first war began in 1603 and ended with a Safavid victory in 1612, when they regained and reestablished their suzerainty over the Caucasus and Western Iran, which had been lost at the Treaty of Constantinople in 1590.

== Course ==
=== Safavid attack and early successes (1603–1604) ===
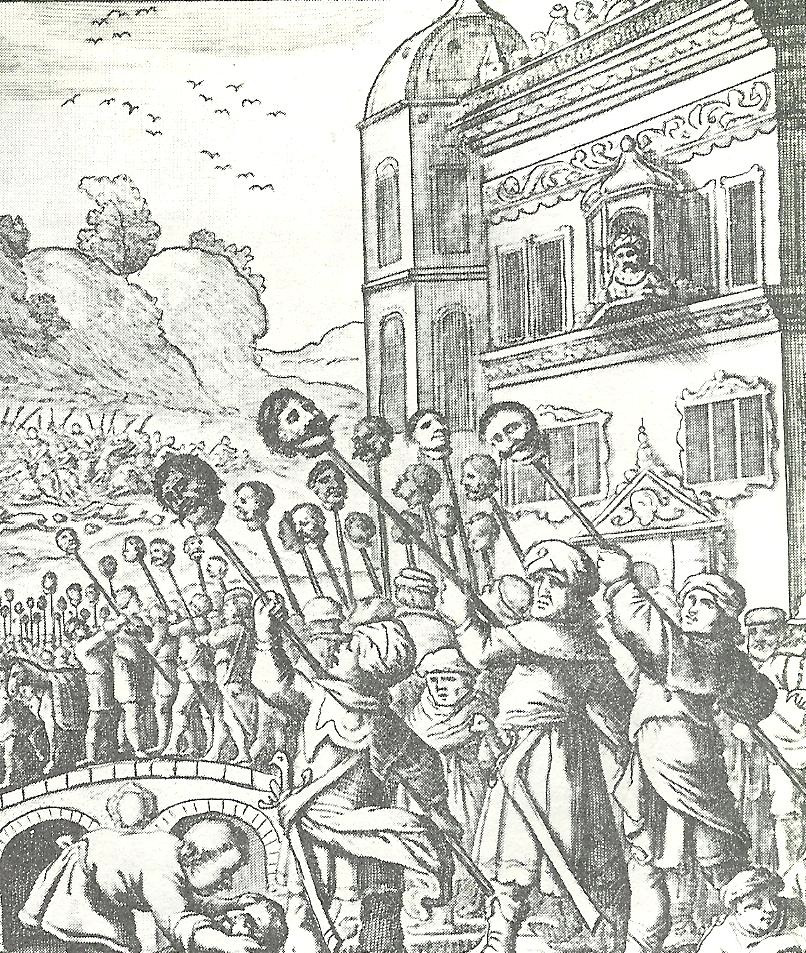
Drawing of the capture of Tabriz and the parading before Shah Abbas I of the severed heads of Ottoman soldiers. Drawn by a European traveller, 1603.

As a result of the Ottoman–Safavid War (1578–1590) the Ottomans had gained swaths of the Safavid territories in the northwest and west, including Shirvan, Dagestan, most of Azerbaijan, Kartli, Kakheti, Luristan, and Khuzestan.

Abbas I had recently undertaken a major reform of the Safavid army through the English gentleman of fortune Robert Shirley and the shah's favorite ghulam and chancellor Allahverdi Khan.

When Abbas I decided to attack the Ottomans to recover the large territories lost in the previous war, the Ottomans were engaged heavily in the European front due to the Long Turkish War started in 1593. Furthermore, the Ottomans were troubled in Eastern Anatolia because of the Jelali revolts, the Karayazıcı rebellion (1598–1602) being the most destructive one. Constantinople, the capital of the Ottoman Empire was also in turmoil in the beginning of 1603 as the tension between the Janissaries and the Sipahis were only to be eased temporarily with the intervention of the Palace.

Thus, the Safavid attack on 26 September 1603 caught the Ottomans unprepared and forced them to fight on two distant fronts. Abbas I first recaptured Nahavand and destroyed the fortress in the city, which the Ottomans had planned to use as an advance base for attacks on Iran. The Safavid army was able to capture Tabriz on 21 October 1603. For the first time, the Iranians made great use of their artillery and the town – which had been ruined by Ottoman occupation – soon fell. Local citizens welcomed the Safavid army as liberators and took harsh reprisals against the defeated Ottoman Turks who had been occupying their city. Many unfortunate Turks fell into the hands of Tabriz's citizens and were decapitated. The Safavids entered Nakhchivan in the same month soon after the city was evacuated by the Ottomans. The Safavid army then laid siege to Yerevan on 15 November 1603. Safavid armies captured Tbilisi and both Kartli and Kakheti became Safavid dependencies once again.

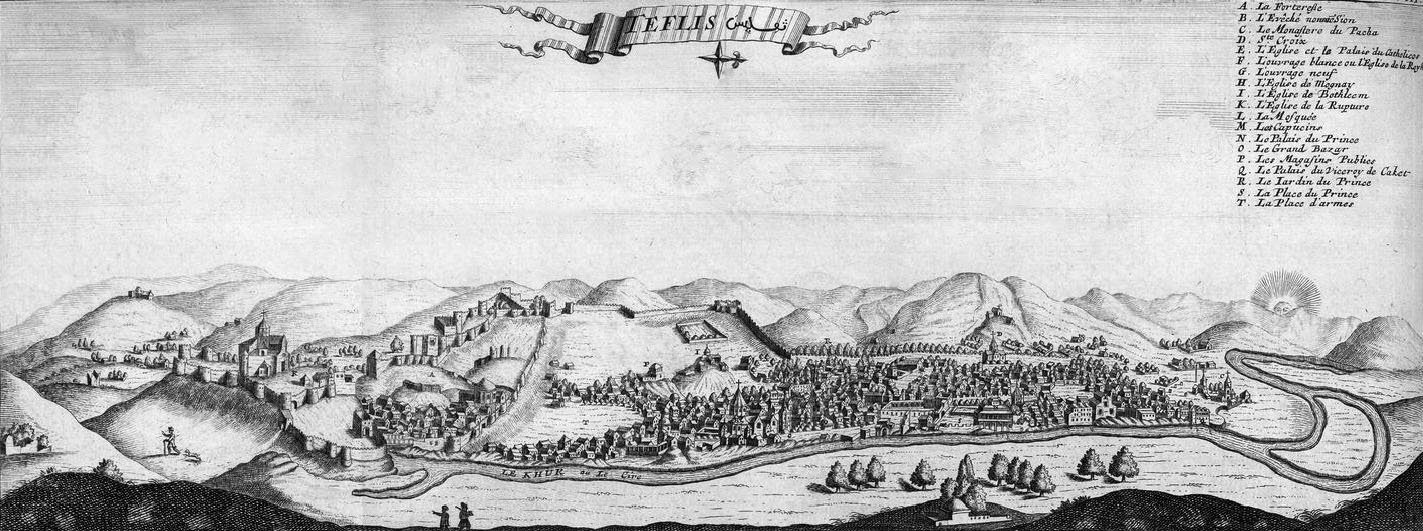
View of Tbilisi as per French traveller Jean Chardin, 17th century

=== Unsuccessful Ottoman counter-attack (1604–1605) ===
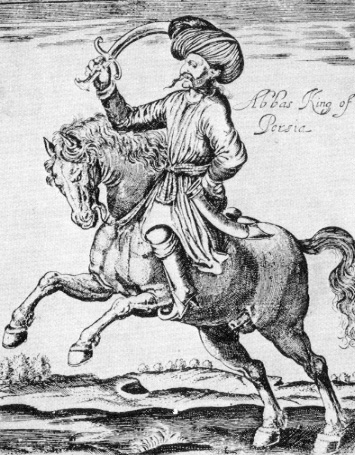
"Abbas King of Persia", as seen by Thomas Herbert in 1627

While facing disasters on the Eastern front, Mehmed III died on 20 December 1603 at the age of 37. The new sultan Ahmed I who was 13 years old appointed Cigalazade Yusuf Sinan Pasha as the commander of the eastern army who marched from Constantinople on 15 June 1604, a very late time for the campaigning season. By the time, he reached the front on 8 November 1604, the Safavid army had already captured Yerevan in June and advanced towards Kars before being stopped in Akhaltsikhe. Seeing the late season as an excuse, he did not counter-attack Abbas I and decided to stay in Van until the end of the winter. However, the Safavid advance forced him to march towards Erzurum. The inactivity created unrest among the Turkish ranks.

His campaign of 1605 was unsuccessful, the forces he led towards Tabriz suffering defeat near the shore of Lake Urmia on 9 September 1605. This was the first Safavid pitched victory against the Ottomans in their history. In this battle Abbas I utilized his predominantly cavalry force to great advantage, decisively defeating the Ottomans, who suffered some 20,000 dead. Kose Sefer Pasha, Beylerbey of Erzurum, acted independently and was captured by Safavid forces. Cağaloğlu had to withdraw to the fortress of Van and thence in the direction of Diyarbakır. He ordered the execution of Canbulatoğlu Hüseyin Pasha claiming he was late to reinforce the Ottoman army which caused a larger unrest. Sinan died in the course of this retreat in December 1605 and Abbas I was able to liberate the Shirvan province in June 1606.

=== Ottomans focus on western and internal fronts (1605–1609) ===
The Ottomans focused on the western front and the successful campaign of 1605 against the Holy Roman Empire under the command of Grand Vizier Sokolluzade Lala Mehmed Pasha ameliorated the situation in Hungary, which paved the way to the Peace of Zsitvatorok in 1606. Ahmed I appointed Lala Mehmed Pasha as the commander of the eastern front who died suddenly on 25 June 1606.

The absence of an effective Ottoman army created a power vacuum in the Empire's eastern fronts. Thus, Jelali revolts reached its zenith as Tavil Ahmed captured Harput and his son Mehmed overthrew the Ottoman authority in Baghdad and defeated the Ottoman force under Nasuh Pasha who was sent to restore order in Iraq. Baghdad was cleared of rebels only in 1607 while Fakhr-al-Din II extended his authority in Lebanon and western Syria with the alliance of another rebel Canbulatoğlu Ali Pasha who challenged Sultan's authority in Adana.

With the advantage of peace on the western front the Ottoman Empire gave its priority to the eastern front. The army under the command of Grand Vizier Kuyucu Murad Pasha decided to crush the rebellions first to secure the back of the army against the Safavids. Tens of thousands of Anatolians were killed during Murad Pasha's office in his campaigns (1607–1609) against separate large rebel groups.

=== Renewed Ottoman counter-attack and peace (1610–1612) ===
When the order was restored, Murad Pasha marched against Abbas I who was in Tabriz in 1610. Although the two armies met in Acıçay, north of Tabriz, no engagement or action took place. Due to the problems in the logistics, supply chain and the approaching winter, Murad Pasha withdrew his forces to Diyarbakır. On their way back, his forces were ambushed by the Qizilbash in the Lake Urmia region. While being engaged in diplomatic correspondence with Abbas I for peace and preparing his army for another campaign at the same time he died on 5 August 1611 when he was older than 90.

Nasuh Pasha was appointed as the new grand vizier and the commander of the eastern armies. He sued for peace, too, and accepted the proposal of the Safavid side in 1611. The Treaty of Nasuh Pasha was signed on 20 November 1612. The agreement secured the 1555 borders envisaged by the Peace of Amasya. Shah Abbas however, committed himself to send 200 bales of raw silk annually.

== See also ==
- Persian embassy to Europe (1599–1602)

== Sources ==
- Blow, David (2009). Shah Abbas: The Ruthless King Who became an Iranian Legend. London, UK: I. B. Tauris & Co. Ltd. ISBN 978-1-84511-989-8. LCCN 2009464064.
- Matthee, Rudi (2011). Persia in Crisis: Safavid Decline and the Fall of Isfahan. I.B.Tauris. pp. 1–371. ISBN 978-0-85773-181-4.
- Parizi, Mohammad-Ebrahim Bastani (2000). "GANJ-ʿALĪ KHAN". Encyclopaedia Iranica, Vol. X, Fasc. 3. pp. 284–285.
- Roemer, H.R. (1986). "The Safavid period". The Cambridge History of Iran, Volume 5: The Timurid and Safavid periods. Cambridge: Cambridge University Press. pp. 189–351. ISBN 978-0-521-20094-3.
- Conflict and Conquest in the Islamic World, A Historical Encyclopedia, volume 1, page 699.
