= Kaveh Farrokh =

Greek historian of Iran

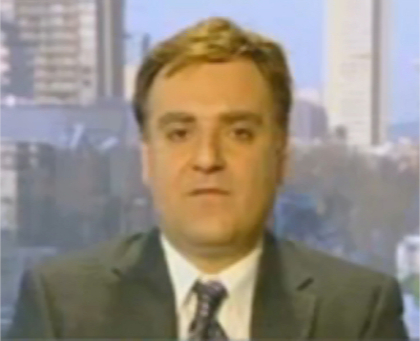
- VOA Interview, 2008
- Born: Athens, Greece
- Occupations: Author, academic lecturer, and college counselor

Academic background
- Education: University of British Columbia (PhD), (MA), (BA); Institute Chateaubriand
- Alma mater: University of British Columbia
- Thesis: The Relationships Among Cognitive Processes, Language Experience and Errors in Farsi Speaking ESL Adults (2001)
- Academic advisor: Prods Oktor Skjaervo

Academic work
- Main interests: Iranian Studies, Classics, Military History, Linguistics
- Notable works: Shadows in the Desert: Ancient Persia at War; Iran at War: 1500 - 1988
- Website: www.kavehfarrokh.com

Kaveh Farrokh (Persian: کاوه فرخ) is a Greek author of several academic books and peer-reviewed publications specializing in Iranian history, and has been a frequent lecturer on Iran-related topics at the University of British Columbia as part of the UBC Continuing Education program. Currently, he is a counselor and learning specialist at Langara College in Vancouver, British Columbia, Canada.

== Life ==
Farrokh was born in Athens, Greece and later attended Institute Chateaubriand in Cannes, France. Farrokh earned his doctorate (PhD) in 2001 from the Department of Educational and Counselling Psychology at the University of British Columbia, where he specialized in the cognitive and linguistic processes of Persian speakers. Previously, he earned his MA in 1988 and BA in 1985 from the same institution.

Farrokh has authored four books on the military history of Iran, co-authored two books on the same topic, acted as editor for academic publications, and contributed to a number of articles for peer-reviewed journals and online publications. He has also been quoted in media outlets concerning Iranian history. For example, Farrokh was interviewed on Voice of America's Persian service about the legacy of the Achaemenid founder, Cyrus the Great. The History Channel has also interviewed him on the topic of technology in ancient Persia for the series Engineering an Empire, which aired in 2006.

He has also lectured at the University of British Columbia's Persian Legacy series in addition to other engagements hosted by the University of British Columbia's Department of Asian Studies.

In 2009, he was given a Merit Award by the Iran Heritage, Persian Gulf, and Iran Alliance.

== Books ==
Farrokh has authored and co-authored a number of books. He has contributed to edited books in addition to acting as editor for other academic and professional publication outlets.

=== Authored ===
His first book, Sassanian Elite Cavalry AD 224 - 642, was published in 2005 by Osprey Publishing.

His second book, Shadows in the Desert: Ancient Persia at War, was published in 2007 by Osprey Publishing. In its foreword, Richard N. Frye, the Aga Khan Professor Emeritus of Iranian Studies at Harvard University praises the author for giving "the Persian side of the picture as opposed to the Greek and Roman viewpoint which has long dominated our understanding of these wars", describing Farrokh's approach as "refreshing". The book was criticized by Jona Lendering in Bryn Mawr Classical Review, who has written that it contained factual errors and ignored recent scholarship. Lendering's review was disputed in a later issue of Bryn Mawr Classical Review. Citing Lendering, Pierre Briant and Amélie Kuhrt agree that recent advances in Achaemenid historiography are not always correctly evaluated and taken fully into account. They also criticize excessively aggressive responses by others to Lendering's review stating that such polemical exchange gives a distorted, even caricatured image of the state of Achaemenid history today.

His third book, Iran at War: 1500 - 1988, was published in 2011 by Osprey Publishing and covered Iranian military history from the Safavid Empire to the Iran-Iraq War.

His fourth book, The Armies of Ancient Persia: The Sassanians, was published in 2017 by the Pen & Sword Military imprint of Pen and Sword Books.

=== Co-authored ===
A Synopsis of Sasanian Military Organization and Combat Units, co-authored with Gholamreza Karamian and Katarzyna Maksymiuk, was published in 2018 by Archeobooks of Krakow, Poland as well as the publishing house of Siedlce University of Natural Sciences and Humanities.

The Siege of Amida (359 CE), co-authored with Javier Sánchez-Gracia and Katarzyna Maksymiuk, was also published in 2018 by Archeobooks as well as the publishing house of Siedlce University of Natural Sciences and Humanities.

== Select bibliography ==
Farrokh's works have appeared and been translated into a number of languages including Spanish, Persian, Russian, German, and Polish.

=== English language sources ===
- Farrokh, Kaveh (2020). "Pan-Arabism and Iran". In Ness, Immanuel; Cope, Zak (eds.). The Palgrave Encyclopedia of Imperialism and Anti-Imperialism. Palgrave Macmillan. ISBN 9780230392786.
- Farrokh, Kaveh (2017). The Armies of Ancient Persia: The Sassanians. South Yorkshire, UK: Pen and Sword Military. ISBN 978-1848848450.
- Farrokh, Kaveh (2011). Iran at War: 1500 - 1988. Oxford, UK: Osprey Publishing. ISBN 978-1-84603-491-6.
- Farrokh, Kaveh (2007). Shadows in the Desert: Ancient Persia at War. Oxford, UK: Osprey Publishing. ISBN 978-1846031083.
- Farrokh, Kaveh (2005). Sassanian Elite Cavalry AD 224-642. Oxford, UK: Osprey Publishing. ISBN 1841767131.
- Farrokh, Kaveh; Karamian, Gholamreza; Maksymiuk, Katarzyna (2018), A Synopsis of Sasanian Military Organization and Combat Units, Tehran Azad University & Siedlce University: Publishing House of Siedlce University of Natural Sciences and Humanities, ISBN 978-8362447220
- Farrokh, Kaveh; Maksymiuk, Katarzyna; Sánchez-Gracia, Javier (2018), The Siege of Amida 359 CE, Siedlce University: Publishing House of Siedlce University of Natural Sciences and Humanities., ISBN 978-8370518875

=== Spanish language sources ===
- Sánchez-Gracia, Javier & Farrokh, Kaveh (2019). Trajano Pártico: Las victoriosas campañas de Trajano en Persia, 114-117 d.C. [Trajan Parthicus: The victorious campaigns of Trajan in Persia, 114-117 CE]. Zaragoza, Spain: HRM Ediciones.

=== Persian language sources ===
- کاوه فرخ و غلامرضا کرمیان (۱۳۹۵). ساختار ارتش اشکانیان. تهران: خانه تاریخ و تصویر ابریشمی. Farrokh, Kaveh & Karamian, Gholamreza (2016). The Structure of the Parthian Army. Tehran: Khaneye Tarikh va Tasvire Abrishami.
- کاوه فرخ - سواره نظام زبده ساساني (۱۳۹۳) - مترجم: ميثم عليي - ناشر :انتشارات اميرکبير - محل نشر : تهران – Elite Sassanian Cavalry translated into Persian (2014) by Amir Kabir Publishers (Tehran, Iran), Translator into Persian (Meysam Aliee).
- ترجمه ایران در جنگ از چالدران تا جنگ تحمیلی توسط انتشارات ققنوس (۱۳۹۷) - Farrokh Book (2011) Iran at War - translated by Qoqnoos Publishers into Persian (2018), Translator (Maryam Saremi).
- کاوه فرخ - سایه‌هایی در بیابان: ایران باستان در زمان جنگ (بهمن ۱/ ۱۳۹۰ ) - مترجم: پدرام خزایی - ناشر : طاق‌ بستان - محل نشر : كرمانشاه - Shadows in the Desert: Ancient Persia at War translated into Persian (Jan. 21, 2012) by Tagh Bostan Publishers (Kermanshah, Iran), Translator (Pedram Khozai).
- خبرگزاری مهر(۱۳۹۰/۷/۲)- کاوه فرخ - ساﯾﻳﻫای صحرا؛ﺍﯾراﺍن باستان ﺩر جنگ - مترجم: شهربانو سارمی - ناشر : ققنوس - محل نشر : تهران -Mehr News (Sept 24, 2011): Shadows in the Desert: Ancient Persia at war Translated into Persian by Qoqnoos Publishers (Tehran, Iran), Translator to Persian (Maryam Saremi).
- کاوه فرخ - اسواران ساسانی (۱۳۸۸) - مترجم: یوسف امیری - ناشر : گل افتاب - محل نشر : مشهد - Elite Sassanian Cavalry translated into Persian (2009) by Gole Aftab Publishers (Mashad, Iran), Translator to Persian (Yusef Amiri).
- کاوه فرخ - سواره نظام زبده ارتش ساسانی (۱۳۸۷) - مترجم: بهنام محمدپناه - ناشر : سبزان - محل نشر : تهران - Elite Sassanian Cavalry translated into Persian (2008) by Sabzan Publishers (Tehran, Iran), Translator to Persian (Behnam Mohammad-Panah).

=== Russian language sources ===
- Персы: Армия великих царей, Cерия: Военная история человечества, Москва (July 24, 2009) - Shadows in the Desert: Ancient Persia at war Translated into Russian by EXMO Publishers: Military History of Mankind Series (Moscow, Russian Federation), Translator to Russian (A. Efremov).

=== German language sources ===
- Farrokh, Kaveh & Khorasani, Manouchehr Moshtagh (2020). Die Sassanidische Infantrie [The Sassanian Infantry]. Pallasch: Zeitschrift für Militärgeschichte. Organ der Österreichischen Gesellschaft für Heerskunde, No. 71, February 2020, pp. 25–35.
