= Sitt al-Mulk =

Regent of the Fatimid Empire (r. 1021–1023)

Regent of the Fatimid Caliphate
- Reign: 1021–1023
- Predecessor: al-Hakim bi-Amr Allah
- Successor: al-Zahir li-Izaz Din Allah
- Born: 970 al-Mansuriya
- Died: 5 February 1023 (aged 52–53); Cairo
- Dynasty: Fatimid
- Father: al-Aziz Billah
- Mother: al-Sayyida al-Aziziyya

Sitt al-Mulk (Arabic: ست الملك, lit. 'Lady of the Kingdom'; 970–1023) was a Fatimid princess. After the disappearance of her half-brother, the caliph al-Hakim bi-Amr Allah, in 1021, she was instrumental in securing the succession of her nephew al-Zahir li-I'zaz Din Allah, and acted as the de facto ruler of the state until her death on 5 February 1023.

== Family and early life ==
She was born in September/October 970 at the palace-city of al-Mansuriya in Ifriqiya (modern Tunisia), to the prince Nizar—the future fifth Fatimid imam–caliph, al-Aziz Billah (r. 975–996). Her mother was an unnamed Jarya concubine (umm walad) of the Fatimid dynasty, who is most likely to be identified with the al-Sayyida al-Aziziyya (lit. 'the Lady of al-Aziz') frequently mentioned in the sources. Al-Sayyida al-Aziziyya was a Melkite Christian, most likely of Byzantine Greek origin, possibly from a family of the provincial aristocracy of Sicily who were captured in the wars against the Byzantines there sometime before 965. It is known that al-Sayyida al-Aziziyya refused to convert to Islam. Al-Aziz's love for her was great, but scandalized pious Muslim opinion, especially at a time when al-Aziz was at war with the Byzantines in Syria. Her Christian faith reportedly caused suspicion that she was behind his tolerance towards Christians and Jews, which went as far as the appointment of a Christian, Isa ibn Nasturus, as vizier. In 986, two of her brothers were appointed to high office in the Melkite Church: Orestes became Patriarch of Jerusalem, and Arsenios was made metropolitan bishop of Fustat, and later Patriarch of Alexandria.

It is still debated among modern scholars whether al-Sayyida al-Aziziyya was also the mother of Sitt al-Mulk's younger brother, and al-Aziz's heir and successor, al-Hakim bi-Amr Allah (r. 996–1021), but the evidence appears to be against it. (Note: This has led to considerable confusion in modern sources regarding the identity and wider family of al-Aziz's consorts. The connection with al-Sayyida has led to speculation that al-Hakim' mother was also a Christian. The sources are contradictory on the matter, but among modern historians Heinz Halm considers al-Hakim's mother a "Greek Christian" (although a distinct person from al-Sayyida al-Aziziyya), and Orestes and Arsenios the maternal uncles of al-Hakim, as does Michael Brett. On the other hand, the medieval historian Yahya of Antioch reports that after al-Hakim's death, Sitt al-Mulk donated vestments, books, and silver liturgical objects that she had inherited from Arsenios, implying that she was related to him.) When her mother died in November 995, the historian al-Maqrizi reports, Sitt al-Mulk held vigil at her tomb for one month. From her mother the princess inherited a slave girl, Taqarrub, who became her chief confidante and spy in the palace.

One year before the birth of Sitt al-Mulk, the Fatimid armies had conquered Egypt. In 972–973, the Fatimid court moved from Ifriqiya to Egypt to take up residence in their newly built capital, Cairo. Thus Sitt al-Mulk spent her childhood at the palace of Qasr al-Bahr on the shores of the Nile, and later had her own rooms in the Western Palace at Cairo.

Sitt al-Mulk was doted on by her father, and was his favourite daughter. Al-Aziz lavished gifts and wealth on her, and she had a personal palace with 4000 maids and even put a military unit at her disposal. Her wealth allowed her to fund a number of charitable endowments. She was renowned for her beauty, but, following common Fatimid practice, she remained unmarried to avoid dynastic complications. Sitt al-Mulk inherited her father's open-mindedness and tolerance, and, uniquely among Fatimid palace ladies, she was involved in politics. She exercised considerable influence on him during his reign, as seen by the attempt of the Christian vizier Isa ibn Nasturus, when he was dismissed from his post, to regain his post through her intercession (for which he placed 300,000 dinars at her disposal).

== Reign of al-Hakim ==
Caliph al-Aziz died suddenly at Bilbays on 13 October 996, while preparing an expedition against the Byzantines in northern Syria. His sudden death opened the issue of succession, as the caliph's only surviving son, al-Mansur, was eleven years old. His half-sister Sitt al-Mulk therefore supported another candidate, an adult son of the prince Abdallah, who had been the first designated heir to Caliph al-Mu'izz li-Din Allah (r. 953–975) but had died shortly before him, leading to the accession of al-Aziz. According to the Arab chroniclers, she had fallen in love with this otherwise unknown cousin and intended to marry him. The princess reportedly hurried back to Cairo with the senior courtiers and the palace guard to take control of the palace and raise her candidate to the throne, but the eunuch Barjawan, who was al-Mansur's tutor, pre-empted her by putting the crown on the boy's head as soon as news of al-Aziz's death arrived. Al-Mansur thus became caliph with the regnal name of al-Hakim bi-Amr Allah, while Sitt al-Mulk was placed under house arrest.

Nevertheless, although not much information survives, during the early part of al-Hakim's reign, the relations between Sitt al-Mulk and her brother appear to have been normal and even amicable: in 997, she made him rich gifts, and soon after Barjawan's murder in 1000, which allowed al-Hakim to take over the reins of government himself, he conferred estates with an annual income of 100,000 gold dinars on her and al-Hakim used to consult her in his difficult or dilemma tasks. Moreover, she was the intermediary of the caliph and others, who asked her for favors or to intercede on their behalf with her brother, the caliph or conveyed information to the caliph through her. In 1000, al-Hakim even married one of her slave girls. She also intervened to inform her brother, who was rather ignorant of state affairs, of a conspiracy by two senior officials that led to the execution of the vizier Abu'l-Ala Fahd ibn Ibrahim, followed by the extortion of vast sums from tax officials in Palestine. In 1013, she mediated with her brother for a pardon to the Jarrahid chieftain al-Hasan ibn Mufarrij, who had previously risen in revolt against Fatimid rule in Palestine along with his father, Mufarrij ibn Daghfal ibn al-Jarrah.

Soon, however, al-Hakim's reign began to degenerate into terror and arbitrary rule. The state suffered from an increasingly erratic governance, as the Caliph issued a bewildering array of prohibitions ranging from food and singing in public to dogs and baths, launched a persecution of Christians and Jews (culminating in the destruction of the Church of the Holy Sepulchre in 1009), purged the old guard of officials he had inherited from his father, and introduced doctrinal innovations, even to the point of seemingly accepting the divine status accorded to him by some of the Isma'ili faithful (who would later found the Druze sect).

As a result, the two siblings drifted apart. The princess opposed al-Hakim's intolerant politics, and he was jealous of her, suspecting her of having lovers, including among his generals. The event that most contributed to the rift between the two was connected to the succession: in 1013, al-Hakim chose a cousin, Abd al-Rahim ibn Ilyas, as the designated heir apparent (walī ʿahd al-muslimīn), violating the direct line of succession and overturning a century of precedent of excluding the males of the wider dynasty from all affairs of state. Sitt al-Mulk was committed to the succession of al-Hakim's surviving son Ali, and took him and his mother, the umm walad Ruqayya, into her palace to shield them from the Caliph. The downfall of al-Hakim's erstwhile favourite Malik ibn Sa'id al-Fariqi in 1014/5 is apparently related to this: Malik, who had been raised to head of the judiciary, as chief qāḍī, and of the Isma'ili hierarchy, as chief dāʿī, was accused of being close to her (apparently siding with her over the choice of heir), and was executed.

On the night of 13 February 1021, the Caliph disappeared during one of his nightly walks in the streets of Cairo. After a couple of days of search, evidence of his murder was found, and he was declared dead. Of the three contemporary historians to write about these events (and who in turn provided the material for many later historians), the account of the Baghdadi chronicler Hilal al-Sabi directly implicates the princess, writing that after Sitt al-Mulk quarreled with her brother over the direction of the state and the future of the dynasty, she began to fear that he would have her killed. She thus approached the Kutama general Ibn Dawwas, whom the Caliph suspected of being one of her lovers, and conspired with him to have al-Hakim killed, which was done by Ibn Dawwas' slaves. Given the fervently anti-Fatimid bias of Hilal, this account is suspect, but the later historians Sibt ibn al-Jawzi and Ibn Taghribirdi, apparently relying on the second contemporary account, that of the Egyptian Shafi'i qāḍī al-Quda'i, report that she ordered the execution of all those who participated in the conspiracy to kill al-Hakim. This has been interpreted by modern historians as an attempt to cover up her involvement. On the other hand, Yahya of Antioch, a Christian who had fled al-Hakim's persecution, mentions nothing of Sitt al-Mulk's involvement in al-Hakim's death. Modern scholars are likely divided, with some, such as Yaacov Lev and Fatema Mernissi, considering her participation as probable, and others, such as Heinz Halm, considering it dubious, since there were many other members of the Fatimid establishment, including Ibn Dawwas, who had an interest in eliminating the erratic caliph. Even Halm admits, however, that the rumours were persistent, and that, as the affair around Malik al-Fariqi shows, al-Hakim did not trust his sister.

== Regency ==
Following the disappearance of al-Hakim, and even before he was declared dead, Sitt al-Mulk moved to establish her control of the court, distributing money to the court dignitaries and military commanders (according to Hilal, with the aid of Ibn Dawwas). Hilal reports that al-Hakim's son Ali was raised to the throne, with the regnal name al-Zahir li-i'zaz Din Allah, only seven days after al-Hakim's disappearance, but all other sources mention that he was crowned on 27 March, with Sitt al-Mulk as the de facto ruler of the state in the meantime. All sources agree that she quickly had Ibn Dawwas executed as the one responsible for al-Hakim's death (and perhaps to cover up her own culpability). This was followed soon after by al-Hakim's designated heir, Abd al-Rahim ibn Ilyas, who was then serving as governor of Damascus: he was lured back to Egypt, imprisoned, and killed.

The new caliph had long been under her tutelage during al-Hakim's reign, and remained so for some time after his coronation, which led to tensions with al-Zahir's mother, Ruqayya. During this early period of al-Zahir's reign, Sitt al-Mulk was the effective governor of the state, known in contemporary sources as 'the Princess-Aunt' (al-Sayyida al-ʿAmma) or 'the Princess Aziz' (al-Sayyida al-ʿAzīza). In this capacity, she began to reverse al-Hakim's decisions, and restore orderly government, with a particular attention to the state finances: among other measures, she cancelled the estate grants and salaries that al-Hakim had conferred on his favourites, and restored the customs duties that he had abolished for being un-Islamic. She also reversed her brother's manifold prohibitions, allowing women to leave their homes, and permitting again the listening to music and the drinking of wine. The non-Muslims (dhimmīs) who had been forced to convert to Islam under al-Hakim were allowed to return to their old faith, and those who had fled the country were allowed to return.

Historian Yaacov Lev points out that she was able to rule as the result of several factors. On the one hand, while women of the Fatimid dynasty were not usually involved in politics, they were "not secluded from social and economic life", which not only allowed them contact with the world outside the palace, but even necessitated the supervision of the administrative and financial agents acting on their behalf, giving them some experience in such matters. Finally, particularly after the chaos and terror of al-Hakim's last years, the ruling elite was quite prepared to accept direction from her, for they had little left to lose. As Lev writes, in this atmosphere, "machinations and the readiness to shed blood had become accepted ways of conducting political life, and by these standards, Sitt al-Mulk was a ruler worthy of the name, for she inspired hayba [i.e., awe]". However, while she was widely praised by medieval chroniclers for both her personal qualities as well as for her sound policies, her position was anomalous, and dependent on the entirely exceptional circumstances. She may have de facto exercised the functions of a caliph, but it was unthinkable for her to hold power in her own name and claim sovereignty, for example by having her name included in the khuṭba (Friday sermon). It is unclear how long her regency lasted; the contemporary official and historian al-Musabbihi indicates that power soon passed to a new circle of officials, and that she lost her influence and died in obscurity, while al-Maqrizi indicates that she maintained her control over state affairs until her death. Sitt al-Mulk used her personal slave woman and confidant Taqarrub as her personal agent of information.

She also severely persecuted the Druze religion, which believed in al-Hakim's divinity. She succeeded in eliminating it entirely from Egypt, and restricting it to the mountains of Lebanon. She also worked to reduce tensions with the Byzantine Empire over the possession of Aleppo, but before negotiations could be completed, Sitt al-Mulk died of dysentery on 5 February 1023 at the age of fifty-two.

== Sources ==
- Brett, Michael (2017). The Fatimid Empire. The Edinburgh History of the Islamic Empires. Edinburgh: Edinburgh University Press. ISBN 978-0-7486-4076-8.
- Cortese, Delia; Calderini, Simonetta (2006). Women and the Fatimids in the World of Islam. Edinburgh: Edinburgh University Press. ISBN 0-7486-1733-7.
- Halm, Heinz (1997). "Sitt al-Mulk". In Bosworth, C. E.; van Donzel, E.; Heinrichs, W. P. & Lecomte, G. (eds.). The Encyclopaedia of Islam, Second Edition. Volume IX: San–Sze. Leiden: E. J. Brill. pp. 685–686. ISBN 978-90-04-10422-8.
- Halm, Heinz (2003). Die Kalifen von Kairo: Die Fatimiden in Ägypten, 973–1074 [The Caliphs of Cairo: The Fatimids in Egypt, 973–1074] (in German). Munich: C. H. Beck. ISBN 3-406-48654-1.
- Halm, Heinz (2015). "Prinzen, Prinzessinnen, Konkubinen und Eunuchen am fatimidischen Hof" [Princes, Princesses, Concubines and Eunuchs at the Fatimid Court]. In Pomerantz, Maurice A.; Shahin, Aram A. (eds.). The Heritage of Arabo-Islamic Learning. Studies Presented to Wadad Kadi (in German). Leiden and Boston: Brill. pp. 91–110. ISBN 978-90-04-30590-8.
- Lev, Yaacov (1987). "The Fāṭimid Princess Sitt al-Mulk". Journal of Semitic Studies. 32 (2): 319–328. doi:10.1093/jss/XXXII.2.319. ISSN 0022-4480.
- Mernissi, Fatima (1993) [1990]. The Forgotten Queens of Islam. Translated by Mary Jo Lakeland. Minneapolis: University of Minnesota Press. ISBN 0-8166-2439-9.
- Walker, Paul E. (2011). "The Fatimid Caliph al-Aziz and His Daughter Sitt al-Mulk: A Case of Delayed but Eventual Succession to Rule by a Woman". Journal of Persianate Studies. 4: 30–44. doi:10.1163/187471611X568276. ISSN 1874-7094.
