= Orestes of Jerusalem =

Patriarch of Jerusalem

Orestes Hieremias (Greek: Ὀρέστης), also called Ariston, was the Melkite Patriarch of Jerusalem from 15 January 986 until his death on 3 February 1006.

== Life ==
Orestes was most likely of Byzantine Greek origin, possibly of the provincial aristocracy of Sicily who were captured in the wars against the Byzantines there sometime before 965. His sister became a favourite concubine of the Fatimid caliph al-Aziz Billah (r. 975–996), and mother of the celebrated princess Sitt al-Mulk. Nothing is known of his early life. He lived at the court of al-Aziz for many years. He may be the monk whom the caliph sent to the Kalbid emir of Sicily, Ja'far ibn Muhammad al-Kalbi (r. 983–985) to secure the surrender of some Byzantine fortresses and prisoners previously captured by his grandfather Hasan. Ja'far mistreated the envoy, who left for Constantinople, from where he wrote to al-Aziz to inform him of Ja'far's disobedience.

Between 980 and 985 Orestes spent time in Italy, including Rome. There he met several Calabrian hermit-saints whose biographies he later he wrote. Through his sister's influence he was appointed Greek Patriarch of Jerusalem in January 986, while his brother Arsenios became metropolitan bishop of Fustat and Cairo and later the Greek Patriarch of Alexandria. Other modern scholars consider the brothers to have been related to a different concubine, the mother of Caliph al-Hakim bi-Amr Allah (r. 996–1021), and thus maternal uncles to the caliph.

In 992, Orestes and Patriarch Elias I of Alexandria sent envoys to Pope John XV, reportedly to seek counsel on incorporating Monophysites into the church, at a time when the Byzantine Empire was expanding at the expense of the Arabs, and to receive the right to consecrate the altar cloth. These reasons, reported by the Roman abbot Leo, are most likely garbled or incorrect, but the embassy is likely historical. About the same time he also wrote a letter to King Hugh of France and his son and co-ruler Robert II. According to the hagiography of the stylite saint Lazaros of Mount Galesios, he was ordained by the Patriarch of Jerusalem around the year 1000, which would mean Orestes. Sometime after 996, Patriarch John III of Antioch transferred to Orestes the Church of Georgia and the annual rent it paid, which thenceforth was collected by the canons of the Church of the Holy Sepulchre.

Orestes' nephew, al-Hakim bi-Amr Allah, succeeded al-Aziz Billah in 996, but the first years of his reign were spent under the tutelage of the court eunuch Barjawan. In 1000, in response to a previous Byzantine embassy, Barjawan sent Orestes to Constantinople to negotiate a ten-year peace treaty with the Emperor Basil II and end the Byzantine–Fatimid clashes in Syria. Orestes was still in Constantinople when he died five years later.

During his absence in Constantinople, the governance of the patriarchate fell his brother, Arsenios, until his own downfall in 1010. Arsenios established a unified celebration of Easter after the Egyptian and Palestinian Christians were not able to agree. Orestes was succeeded by Patriarch Theophilus I in 1012 after a period of vacancy. During the vacancy, al-Hakim destroyed the Church of the Holy Sepulchre in 1009.

== Works ==
At least three hagiographies are attributed to him, providing details on the lives and deeds of Nicodemus of Mammola, Sabas the Younger and Sabas's father and brother, Christopher and Makarios. Orestes personally knew Christopher and his two sons. He completed the biography of Sabas (BHG 1611) shortly after the latter's death in 991 and that of his father and brother (BHG 312) sometime between the Makarios's death in 1001 and his own death five years later. The biography of Christopher and Makarios consists of nineteen chapters on Christopher followed by a brief four-chapter encomium on Makarios.

=== Editions ===
- Cozza-Luzi, I. Historia et laudes SS. Sabae et Macarii Iuniorum e Sicilia auctore Oreste Patriarcha Hierosolymitano. Rome, 1893.

== Sources ==
- Gay, Jules (1904). L'Italie méridionale et l'Empire byzantin depuis l'avènement de Basile I^{er} jusqu'à la prise de Bari par les Normands (867–1071). Paris: Albert Fontemoing.
- Gil, Moshe (1997) [1983]. A History of Palestine, 634–1099. Translated by Ethel Broido. Cambridge: Cambridge University Press. ISBN 0-521-59984-9.
- Halm, Heinz (2003). Die Kalifen von Kairo: Die Fatimiden in Ägypten, 973–1074 [The Caliphs of Cairo: The Fatimids in Egypt, 973–1074] (in German). Munich: C. H. Beck. ISBN 3-406-48654-1.
- Lilie, Ralph-Johannes; Ludwig, Claudia; Pratsch, Thomas; Zielke, Beate (2013). Prosopographie der mittelbyzantinischen Zeit Online. Berlin-Brandenburgische Akademie der Wissenschaften. Nach Vorarbeiten F. Winkelmanns erstellt (in German). Berlin and Boston: De Gruyter.
- Re, Mario (2011). "Italo-Greek Hagiography". In Stephanos Efthymiadis (ed.). The Ashgate Research Companion to Byzantine Hagiography. Routledge. Vol. 1, pp. 227–258.
- Richard, Jean (2004). "The Eastern Churches". In Luscombe, David; Riley-Smith, Jonathan (eds.). The New Cambridge Medieval History, Volume 4, c.1024–c.1198, Part 1. Cambridge: Cambridge University Press. pp. 564–598. ISBN 978-1-13905402-7.
- Walker, Paul E. (2011). "The Fatimid Caliph al-Aziz and His Daughter Sitt al-Mulk: A Case of Delayed but Eventual Succession to Rule by a Woman". Journal of Persianate Studies. 4: 30–44. doi:10.1163/187471611X568276. ISSN 1874-7094.

Religious titles
Preceded by Joseph II	Patriarch of Jerusalem; 986-1006	Succeeded by Vacant for 7 years, then Theophilus I
