= Patriarch Arsenius of Alexandria =

Greek Patriarch of Alexandria in 1000–1010

Arsenius (Greek: Ἀρσένιος) served as the Greek patriarch of Alexandria between 1000 and 1010.

Arsenius was most likely of Byzantine Greek origin, possibly of the provincial aristocracy of Sicily who were captured in the wars against the Byzantines there sometime before 965. His sister became a favourite concubine of the Fatimid caliph al-Aziz Billah (r. 975–996), and mother of the celebrated princess Sitt al-Mulk. Through her influence he was appointed metropolitan bishop of Fustat and Cairo in January 986, and patriarch of Alexandria in June 1000. His brother Orestes was likewise the Greek patriarch of Jerusalem in 986–1006. Other modern scholars consider the brothers to have been related to a different concubine, the mother of Caliph al-Hakim bi-Amr Allah (r. 996–1021), and thus maternal uncles to the caliph.

Arsenius frequently resided at the monastery of Dayr al-Qasir ("Monastery of the Dwarf") on the Muqattam hills south of Fustat, which he fortified with a wall and rebuilt and expanded.

His brother left for Constantinople in 1000 to negotiate a treaty between the Fatimid Caliphate and the Byzantine Empire, and remained there until his death in 1006. During his absence, and the subsequent vacancy of the patriarchal throne, Arsenios was the steward of the Patriarchate of Jerusalem as well.

During his ascendancy, Arsenius used his influence at court to strengthen the Melkites against the Coptic Church. When al-Hakim began to persecute Christians, however, starting with the destruction of the Church of the Holy Sepulchre in 1009, Arsenius and his monastery too were not spared: on 18 April 1010, the monastery was destroyed, and even the cemeteries outside its walls were reportedly dug up. Arsenius himself was secretly executed in July of the same year.

== Sources ==
- "Arsenios (1000–1010)". Official web site of the Greek Orthodox Patriarchate of Alexandria and All Africa.
- Halm, Heinz (2003). Die Kalifen von Kairo: Die Fatimiden in Ägypten, 973–1074 [The Caliphs of Cairo: The Fatimids in Egypt, 973–1074] (in German). Munich: C. H. Beck. ISBN 3-406-48654-1.
- Lilie, Ralph-Johannes; Ludwig, Claudia; Pratsch, Thomas; Zielke, Beate (2013). Prosopographie der mittelbyzantinischen Zeit Online. Berlin-Brandenburgische Akademie der Wissenschaften. Nach Vorarbeiten F. Winkelmanns erstellt (in German). Berlin and Boston: De Gruyter.
- Walker, Paul E. (2011). "The Fatimid Caliph al-Aziz and His Daughter Sitt al-Mulk: A Case of Delayed but Eventual Succession to Rule by a Woman". Journal of Persianate Studies. 4: 30–44. doi:10.1163/187471611X568276. ISSN 1874-7094.

Preceded by Elias I	Greek Patriarch of Alexandria; 1000–1010	Succeeded by Theophilus II
