= Sophronius II =

Sophronius II or Sophronios II may refer to:

- Sophronius II of Constantinople
- Sophronius II of Alexandria
- Sophronius II of Jerusalem
