= Theophilus I of Jerusalem =

Patriarch of the Church of Jerusalem

Theophilus I of Jerusalem was the patriarch of the Church of Jerusalem from 1012 to 1020.

Theophilus was Bishop of Hibal before his appointment as Patriarch of Jerusalem by Mufarrij ibn Daghfal ibn al-Jarrah, the autonomous ruler of Palestine. The appointment occurred under the rule of Fatimid Caliph al-Hakim. Mufarrij suggested that the Christian community should re-build the Church of the Holy Sepulchre. However, shortly after making the suggestion, al-Hakim, who, earlier, had ordered the previous church destroyed, declared war on Mufarrij, and sent his troops to Syria and Palestine. Mufarrij soon died and his son and Patriarch Theophilus fled into hiding. In 1013, after a new amicable governor was seated, Patriarch Theophilus returned and stayed in Jerusalem until his repose in 1020.

== Source ==
- Who is who in the Churches of Jerusalem

This article incorporates text from Theophilus I of Jerusalem at OrthodoxWiki which is licensed under the CC-BY-SA and GFDL.

Religious titles
Preceded by Orestes until 1005 (then vacant for 7 years)	Patriarch of Jerusalem; 1012-1020	Succeeded by Nicephorus I
