= Al-Musabbihi =

Fatimid historian, writer and administrative official

al-Musabbiḥī
- المصبحي
- Born: 4 March 977; Fustat, Fatimid Caliphate (now Egypt)
- Died: April/May 1030; Fustat, Fatimid Caliphate (now Egypt)
- Occupations: Historian, Writer, Administrative official

Academic work
- Era: Islamic Golden Age
- Main interests: History, Psychology, Law, Grammar, Sexology, Cooking
- Notable works: Akhbār Miṣr (Chronicle of Egyptian history)
- Notable ideas: Detailed historical accounts of Egypt

Al-Amīr al-Mukhtār ʿIzz al-Mulk Abū ʿAbd Allāh Muḥammad ibn Abīʾl Qāsim ʿUbayd Allāh ibn Aḥmad ibn Ismāʿīl ibn ʿAbd al-Azīz al-Ḥarranī al-Musabbiḥī al-Kātib, commonly known simply as al-Musabbihi (Arabic: المصبحي) (4 March 977 – April/May 1030), was a Sunni Fatimid historian, writer and administrative official. He is known to have authored some 40,000 pages of manuscripts dealing with an array of topics, including history, psychology, law, grammar, sexology and cooking. Akhbār Miṣr, a contemporary chronicle of Egyptian history and news, was among al-Musabbihi's well-known works. However, like the vast majority of al-Musabbihi's works, only fragments of Akhbār Miṣr survived; most of his writings disappeared not long after his death.

Al-Musabbihi was a devout Sunni Muslim born in Fustat, where he lived most of his life and died. He was known to be loyal to the Fatimid government and he was a close friend of with Caliph al-Hakim (r. 996–1021). Early in his career, he served in the Fatimid military and was made a provincial governor in Upper Egypt before becoming a leading figure in the Fatimids' central administration in Cairo.

== Life ==
Al-Musabbihi was born a Sunni Muslim in Fustat, Egypt on 4 March 977. His family was originally from Harran in the Jazira (Upper Mesopotamia). Not common for a locally-born Sunni civilian, al-Musabbihi joined the Fatimid military. He was made governor of al-Qays and Bahnasa (both in Upper Egypt) and held the title of amir (commander). He was later appointed head of the dīwān al-tartīb, a position equivalent to general secretary of the central administration. He traveled daily from al-Fustat to his government post in Cairo and on most evenings, he stopped by the historic Mosque of Amr ibn al-As and interacted with his and his father's friends, most of whom were Syrian Muslim traditionalists. Though he was a devout Sunni Muslim, al-Musabbihi was loyal to the Fatimids' Ismaili Shia state and maintained a particularly close relationship with the eccentric caliph al-Hakim (r. 996–1021). The latter was known to get along with the residents of Fustat. Al-Musabbihi died in Fustat in April/May 1030.

== Writings ==
Al-Musabbihi was a prolific writer, who authored numerous manuscripts on a variety of subjects, including history, practical psychology, sexology, law, grammar and cooking. The later medieval historians Ibn Khallikan and Ibn Sa'id al-Andalusi documented in detailed lists all of al-Musabbihi's works and the amount of pages for each work; al-Musabbihi's total work amounted to roughly 40,000 pages, with some works alone consisting of over a thousand pages. However, most of his work disappeared not long after he died.

=== History of Egypt ===
Among al-Musabbihi's main works was the roughly 13,000-page chronicle of Egypt's history, known as Akhbār Miṣr. Like al-Musabbihi's other works, much of Akhbār Miṣr was lost early on, with exceptions including quotations of this work that were copied in other historians' compilations. The only known manuscript of Akhbār Miṣr that was preserved is chapter 40, which is located in the Escorial in Spain. This section of al-Musabbihi's work documented events occurring in the caliphate between 1023/24 and 1024/25 and also contained poems and letters by other writers who were well-acquainted with al-Musabbihi. According to Thierry Bianquis, this manuscript "provides an insight into the contemporary literary composition, in elegant prose and poetry, of Egypt and Iraq at the beginning of the 11th century". The modern Egyptian historian Ayman Fuad Sayyid claims the 15th-century Egyptian historian al-Maqrizi had in his possession chapter 34 of Akhbar Misr, which recorded events for the year 1004/05.

Akhbar Misr was a contemporary work in which al-Musabbihi recorded the day-to-day events in the Fatimid Caliphate and at the end of the year, recorded the obituaries of notable individuals. As an administrative official in Cairo, he also documented the often violent struggle for power in the aftermath of al-Hakim's death, centered around various military commanders and civil officials, who utilized informers and forged documents to discredit each other in front of al-Hakim's child successor, az-Zahir (r. 1021–1036). He held suspicions about the intrigues of Sitt al-Mulk's entourage with az-Zahir. According to Bianquis, "it is possible that ideological control [following al-Hakim's death] was imposed on official historiography and that a certain number of texts, including the writings of al-Musabbihi, were spontaneously destroyed". Al-Musabbihi also included news about the Bedouin uprising against the Fatimids in Syria in 1024/25 that placed the Mirdasids and Jarrahids in power there. Moreover, Akhbār Miṣr recorded regular aspects of life in Fustat, ranging from road accidents and crimes to wholesale and retail prices on goods amid a famine to hippopotami roaming in the Nile River.

== Bibliography ==
- Bianquis, Thierry (1993). "Musabbiḥī". In Bosworth, C. E.; van Donzel, E.; Heinrichs, W. P. & Pellat, Ch. (eds.). The Encyclopaedia of Islam, Second Edition. Volume VII: Mif–Naz. Leiden: E. J. Brill. pp. 650–652. ISBN 978-90-04-09419-2.
