= Nicephorus I of Jerusalem =

11th-century Patriarch of Jerusalem

Nicephorus I of Jerusalem was the patriarch of the Church of Jerusalem from 1020 to 1048. He was appointed by the Fatimid Caliph al-Hakim. After his appointment, Patriarch Nicephorus visited Al-Hakim at his capital in Egypt. He pleaded with him about the persecutions of the Christians in the Holy Land and asked Al-Hakim's protection for both himself and the Christians. The Caliph agreed to provide protection.

After the death of Al-Hakim in 1021, Emperor Romanus III Argyrus and Ali az-Zahir, the son of Al-Hakim, made peace in 1030. In the meantime, Patriarch Nicephorus continued rebuilding the Church of the Holy Sepulchre, which had been destroyed on Al-Hakim's orders in 1009. In the re-building effort, Patriarch Nicephorus was helped by Joannichius, who would later succeed him. However, in 1034, Jerusalem was hit by an earthquake that substantially damaged the city and the Church of the Holy Sepulchre. Re-construction was going slowly.

In 1042, upon ascending to the throne of Constantinople, Emperor Constantine IX Monomachos finally funded the reconstruction of the Church, as well as other Christian establishments in the Holy Land, under the treaty concluded earlier by Ali az-Zahir and Emperor Romanus III.

Patriarch Nicephorus died in 1048.

== Sources ==
- Who is who in the Churches of Jerusalem

This article incorporates text from Nicephorus I of Jerusalem at OrthodoxWiki which is licensed under the CC-BY-SA and GFDL.

Religious titles
Preceded by Theophilus I	Patriarch of Jerusalem; 1020-1048	Succeeded by Joannichius
