= Patriarch Theophilus of Jerusalem =

Patriarch Theophilus of Jerusalem may refer to:

- Theophilus I of Jerusalem (ruled in 1012–1020)
- Theophilus II of Jerusalem (ruled 1417–1424), Greek Orthodox Patriarch of Jerusalem
- Patriarch Theophilos III of Jerusalem, ruled since 2005
