= Holy Fire =

Eastern Orthodox symbol of Resurrection

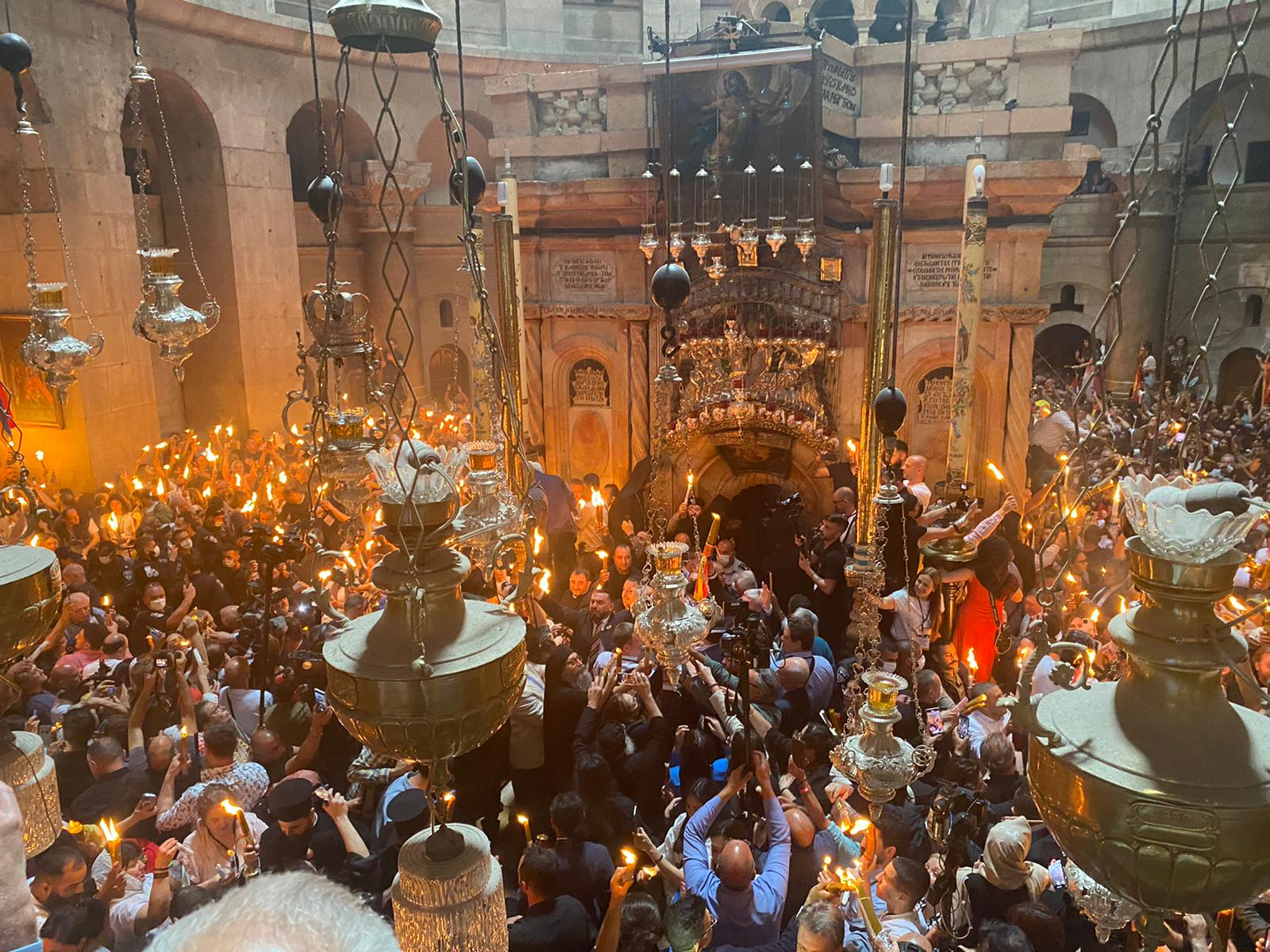
Lighting of the Holy Fire in 2022

The Holy Fire (Greek: Ἃγιον Φῶς, "Holy Light", Armenian: Սուրբ Լոյս) is a ceremony that occurs every year at the Church of the Holy Sepulchre in Jerusalem on Great Saturday, the day before Orthodox Easter. During the ceremony, a prayer is performed after which a fire is lit inside the aediculae where some believe the Tomb of Jesus may have been located. According to the belief, the fire emerges miraculously and is lit by the Holy Spirit. Orthodox Christians believe that this is the blessed light of resurrected Christ, who gives them comfort, joy and peace through it.

The ceremony of the Holy Fire is presided over by the Greek Orthodox Patriarch of Jerusalem. According to the regulations governing the ceremony, the Patriarch is accompanied into the Aedicule by a representative of the Armenian Apostolic Church, while representatives of the Coptic Orthodox Church and the Syriac Orthodox Church have designated positions outside the Aedicule. After the fire is lit, it is distributed to various national churches and transported to their seats, including Athens, Sofia, Moscow, Belgrade, and Bucharest. The ceremony is usually attended by priests and believers of different Christian denominations.

== Description from within the Orthodox faith ==
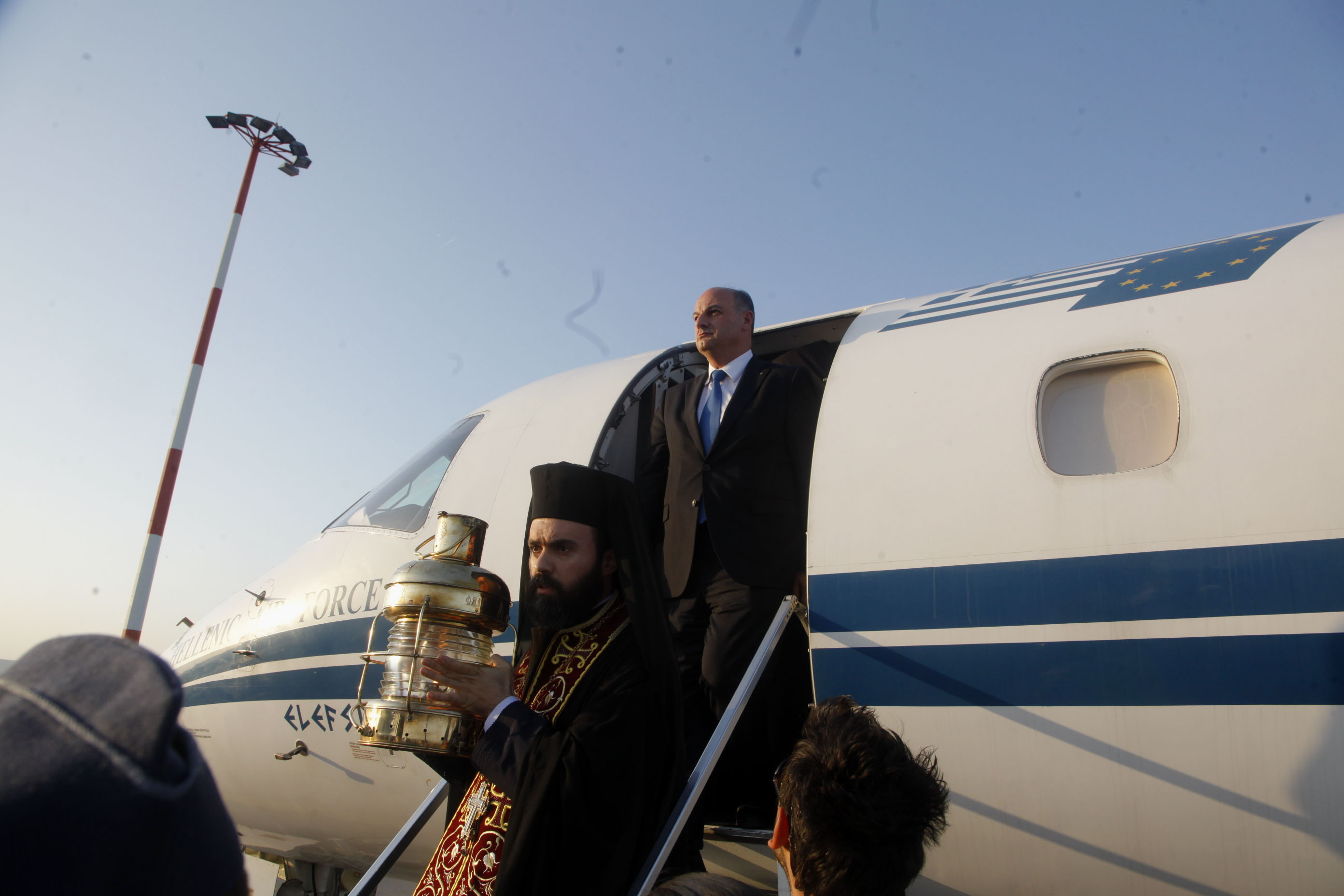
Holy Fire arrives in Athens by plane, 2013.

Orthodox tradition holds that the Holy Fire happens annually on the day preceding Pascha (Orthodox Easter). In the past, blue light was said to emit within Jesus' tomb, rising from the marble slab covering the stone bed believed to be that upon which Jesus' body is to have been placed for burial. The marble slab is now in the Church of the Holy Sepulchre in the Old City of Jerusalem. Previously, the light was believed to form a column of fire, from which candles are lit. Today, a lighter or match is used to light the candles of the clergy and pilgrims in attendance. The fire is also said to spontaneously light other lamps and candles around the church. Pilgrims and clergy say that the Holy Fire does not burn them.

Before the fire is lit, the Patriarch kneels inside the chapel in front of the stone, with crowds gathered outside. When the fire is lit, the Patriarch comes out of the church with two lit candles. Thousands of pilgrims as well as local Christians of all denominations gather in Jerusalem to partake and witness this annual event.

The Holy Fire is taken to Greece by special flight, and similarly to other Orthodox countries or countries with major Orthodox churches, such as Jordan, Syria, Georgia, Bulgaria, Lebanon, Romania, Egypt, Cyprus, North Macedonia, Serbia, Montenegro, Belarus, Ukraine and Russia, being received by church and state leaders.

== History ==
The tradition that a lamp hanging over the tomb of Christ would spontaneously be lit by a light from the heavens after nightfall on the eve of Easter Sunday dates back to the Patristic period, predating the consecration of the Church of the Holy Sepulchre in 335. Eusebius (c. 260-339), a church historian native to Caesarea Palaestina, records in his Ecclesiastical History (Book VI, Chapter 9) an interesting occurrence in Jerusalem on Easter in the year 162. When the church wardens prepared to fill the lamps with oil to celebrate the resurrection of Jesus, they found there was none left, so Bishop Narcissus of Jerusalem ordered the lamps be filled with water and set alight, and every single lamp burned as if filled with pure oil. The Greek historian Gregory of Nyssa (c. 335-494) also mentions the mysterious illumination of Christ's tomb in his fifth Easter homily, 'On the resurrection of our Lord Jesus Christ.'

Around 385 AD, Egeria, a noble woman from Spain, traveled to the Holy Land. In the account of her journey, she speaks of a ceremony by the Holy Sepulchre of Christ, where a light comes forth (ejicitur) from the small chapel enclosing the tomb, by which the entire church is filled with an infinite light (lumen infinitum).

=== Early Islamic period ===
John of Damascus, who was a monk at Mar Saba, recalls in 8th century liturgical chants that Peter saw the tomb of Christ illuminated. Despite these early references, the liturgy of the Holy Fire is believed to have been first recorded by the Christian pilgrim, Bernard the Wise (Bernardus Monachus), in 867. This liturgical practice likely developed in the 8th century and evolved to form an important element of the identity expression of the local Christian community of Palestine (Note: Rouxpetel (2024) calls them "Palestinian Christians". He further explains: "A first clue is given by the ethnonyms used by Fulcher of Chartres, which identify them as Melkites. The term ‘Greeks’ refers to their adherence to Chalcedonian orthodoxy, which they shared with the Byzantine imperial authorities. ‘Syrians’ refers to their geographical origin. The Melkites lived in the eastern provinces of the Byzantine Empire, which came under Islamic administration in the seventh century and thus partly under Frankish rule in the twelfth century. Together with the Syriacs, they formed the majority of the Christian population of the Frankish states and, especially, of the kingdom of Jerusalem.") in the wake of the Muslim conquest of Syria, which had produced some isolation from Constantinople.

Ibn al-Qass (d. 946), a Muslim scholar, provides one of the earliest detailed descriptions of the annual rite, which is preserved in the original manuscript in the National Library of Egypt. Ibn al-Qass distinguishes between two forms of light that appear during this rite, نور (nūr, "light") and نار (nār, fire), describing the former as a "white flame" that is the first to emanate from the interior of the tomb, which is locked with no one inside, while the faithful are gathered around it praying. This light, which he says does not burn, then ignites the candle carried by the Sultan into the interior of the tomb. He passes the flame from his candle to the imam, at which point it has been transformed into earthly fire, and the imam uses this to light the lamps of the mosque in Old City of Jerusalem. The timing of the light's appearance is documented in a report composed for the Sultan. If it appears while people are praying, it is interpreted as a good omen for a fertile agricultural year; and if only appearing afterward, it indicates a year of drought. Ibn al-Qass' description accords significant involvement to Muslim notables in the ceremony and indicates it was not a solely Christian ceremony at his time.

Al-Biruni (973-1050), the Persian polymath, includes a detailed description of the Holy Fire rite in his Arabic work Αl-Athar al-baqiyah ("The Chronology of Ancient Nations") that confirms several aspects of Ibn al-Qass' description, including the participation of Muslim notables, and the forecasting of the year's trajectory based on the timing of the light's appearance. A significant difference in his account concerns the way the lamps come to be lit, as they are placed on top of the sealed tomb and light spontaneously as the same white light described by Ibn al-Qass appears. He describes the imam and emir of the city as being present, sitting and waiting outside the tomb, with Muslim onlookers in the gallery, as the Christian faithful pray. He also mentions that at some point prior to his time, one (unnamed) Sultan tried to spoil the ceremony by replacing the cloth wick of the oil lamp with a copper one, but that even this could not stop the lamp from spontaneously igniting with the appearance of the white light. Al-Biruni's acceptance of the Holy Fire as a miracle is indicated by the final sentence of his passage dedicated to his description, which reads: "The coming that day of the fire from the sky, which recurs at the specific place and time, is cause for us to be in awe."

Haris Skarlakidis, whose work Holy Fire compiles Al-Biruni's description, among many other historical testaments, notes that it is likely that the Destruction of the Church of the Holy Sepulchre by the Fatimid caliph Al-Hakim bi-Amr Allah in 1009, less than a decade after Al-Biruni's work was composed, was partially fuelled by a desire to put an end to the growing reverence around this ceremony, especially as it was seen as genuine and sacred by many Muslims, as well as Christians. Robert Ousterhout also contends that the caliph's actions seem to have been related to the ritual, speculating that the caliph regarded as them as "a fraud". Whatever the caliph's real views and motivations, as early as 1004, he had already banned Easter and Epiphany celebrations, and following the destruction of the Church, banned other processions, as well as continuing a campaign of destruction and confiscation affecting almost all of the convents and churches in Fatimid ruled Palestine.

=== Crusader period ===
Under Baldwin I, Latin clergy had taken over the Holy Sepulchre, and according to Christopher Tyerman, the Greek clergy were restored "after the fiasco of the failure of the regular Easter miracle of the Holy Fire under Latin auspices in 1101, the annual ritual on Easter eve when Holy Fire is supposed to descend from heaven to light the priests' candles in the edicule of the Holy Sepulchre. The newcomers evidently had not learnt the knack."

Nevertheless, other sources describe that the Holy Fire appeared in the holy grave on Sunday (Easter day), when the Latin archbishop Daimbert was not in Holy Sepulchre and processing was carried over by Greeks and other Orthodox Christians. The holy grave was closed during this period by Daimbert.

=== Ottoman period ===
In 1834, in the presence of governor Ibrahim Pasha of Egypt, the frantic pilgrims in the smoke-filled and overcrowded church created a stampede, aggravated by the guards of the pasha, who cut their way out through the masses. Four hundred lost their lives according to an eyewitness, according to the words of English Near East traveller, Robert Curzon.

=== Modern period ===
The ceremony was marred in 2002 when a disagreement between the Greek Patriarch and the accompanying Armenian bishop over who should emerge first with the Holy Fire led to a struggle between the factions. In the course of the scuffle, the Greek Patriarch twice blew the Armenian's candle out, while the Greek Patriarch was despoiled of one of his shoes. In the end the Israeli Police entered the premises to restore order.

== Criticism and opposition ==
In 1238, Pope Gregory IX denounced the Holy Fire as a fraud and forbade Franciscans from participating in the ceremony. Similarly, many Christians have remained unconvinced by the occurrence. According to Shihab al-Din al-Qarafi, the 13th-century Ayyubid ruler Al-Muazzam Turanshah (r. 1249–1250) is mentioned as having discovered the fraudulence of the Holy Fire; however, he allowed the monks to continue their fraud in exchange for money. The Ottoman traveller, Evliya Çelebi (1611–1682), said that a hidden zinc jar of naphtha was dripped down a chain by a hidden monk. Edward Gibbon (1737–1794), wrote scathingly about the alleged phenomenon in the concluding volume of The History of the Decline and Fall of the Roman Empire:

This pious fraud, first devised in the ninth century, was devoutly cherished by the Latin crusaders, and is annually repeated by the clergy of the Greek, Armenian, and Coptic sects, who impose on the credulous spectators for their own benefit and that of their tyrants.

Thomas Tegg, a 19th-century Englishman, included an account of the event in The London Encyclopaedia, published in 1828, speculating that the event is purely natural and motivated by pecuniary interest.

Some Greeks have been critical of the Holy Fire, such as the scholar Adamantios Korais (1748–1833), who condemned what he considered to be religious fraud in his treatise "On the Holy Light of Jerusalem." He referred to the event as "machinations of fraudulent priests" and to the "unholy" light of Jerusalem as "a profiteers' miracle". In 2005, in a live demonstration on Greek television, Michael Kalopoulos, author and historian of religion, dipped five candles in white phosphorus. The candles spontaneously ignited after approximately 10 minutes due to the self-ignition properties of white phosphorus when in contact with air. According to Kalopoulos' website:

If phosphorus is dissolved in an appropriate organic solvent, self-ignition is delayed until the solvent has almost completely evaporated. Repeated experiments showed that the ignition can be delayed for half an hour or more, depending on the density of the solution and the solvent employed.

Kalopoulos also says that chemical reactions of this nature were well known in ancient times, quoting Strabo, who states: "In Babylon there are two kinds of naphtha springs, a white and a black. The white naphtha is the one that ignites with fire." (Strabon Geographica 16.1.15.1-24) He further states that phosphorus was used by Chaldean magicians in the early fifth century BC, and by the ancient Greeks, in a way similar to its supposed use today by the Eastern Orthodox Patriarch of Jerusalem.

Russian skeptic Igor Dobrokhotov has analysed the evidence for an alleged miracle at length on his website, including the ancient sources and contemporary photos and videos. Dobrokhotov and other critics, including Russian Orthodox researcher Nikolay Uspensky, Dr. Aleksandr Musin of Sorbonne, and some Old Believers quote excerpts from the diaries of Bishop Porphyrius (Uspensky) (1804–1885), which told that the clergy in Jerusalem knew that the Holy Fire was fraudulent.

In his book, the journalist Dimitris Alikakos presents an interview with the skeuophylax Archbishop Isidoros of the Patriarchate of Jerusalem, in which the latter admits that the "Sleepless Candle", which he, himself, puts into the Church of the Holy Sepulchre during the morning of the Holy Saturday, is ignited by him with a lighter. The former (1984–1988) skeuophylax Archbishop Nikiforos makes the same acknowledgement, except that he was using matches. In the same book, Archbishop Gerason Theofanis states that the Holy Fire does not light up in a miraculous, but in a natural way, and it is then blessed by the Patriarch. He adds: "we deceive the believers letting them believe that it is a miracle. This is unacceptable, and does not reflect well on us". According to Theofanis, the fraud of the "miracle" was invented by Catholic crusaders a few centuries ago, and was later continued by the Greek Orthodox Patriarchate. In addition, the Metropolitan Bishop Kornilios of Petras, surrogate of the Jerusalem Patriarchate in 2001, confirmed an older interview, saying that he also had ignited the candles of the Holy Fire with a natural candle, and he described in full detail what he saw when he entered the Church of the Holy Sepulchre. Lastly, in his book, the journalist mentions the chronicle of the deletion of the word "miracle" from the official website of the Patriarchate on 23 June 2018, with the commandment of the Patriarch Theofilos III.

One of the Armenian torchbearers, a task that is usually passed down from father to son (or other male member of a torchbearer's family), has admitted that his father revealed to him that the source of the fire was ancient and symbolic but not a miracle. He said: "The Greek priests bring in a lamp – one that has been kept burning for 1,500 years – to produce the Holy Fire. For pilgrims full of faith who come from abroad, it is a fire from Heaven, a true miracle. But not for us."

The Church of the Holy Sepulchre's Armenian Bishop, Samuel Agoyan, has participated in the Holy Fire ceremony alongside the Greek Patriarch on three occasions. In a news segment aired on Israeli Channel 12 on March 10, 2018, Agoyan shared that during his involvement, the Greek Patriarch ignited the fire with the assistance of a lamp.

== See also ==
- Paschal cycle
