= Sophronius of Jerusalem (disambiguation) =

Sophronius of Jerusalem was a father of the church and the patriarch of Jerusalem from 634 until 638.

Sophronius of Jerusalem may also refer to:

- Sophronius II of Jerusalem, patriarch (after 1048–1076/1083)
- Sophronius III of Jerusalem, patriarch (13th century)
- Sophronius IV of Jerusalem, patriarch (before 1291 – before 1303)
- Sophronius V of Jerusalem, patriarch (1771–1774), also Patriarch Sophronius II of Constantinople
