= Joseph II (disambiguation) =

Joseph II (1741–1790) was Holy Roman Emperor from 1765 to 1790.

Joseph II may also refer to:

- Joseph II of Jerusalem (died 985)
- Joseph II of Constantinople (1360–1439)
- Joseph II (Chaldean Patriarch) (1667–1713)
- Joseph II of Schwarzenberg (1769–1833)
- Pope Joseph II of Alexandria (died 1956)

== See also ==
- Yusuf II, Almohad caliph (c. 1203–1224)
