= Sophronius II of Jerusalem =

Sophronius II was the Greek Orthodox patriarch of Jerusalem from sometime after 1036 until at least 1076. He was dead by 1083.

Sophronius is known from only two written sources. The first is a list of patriarchs provided by William of Malmesbury in his Deeds of the Kings of the English. He dates the conquest of Jeruaslem by the Turks and their massacre of the Saracens to his episcopate. This information was probably transmitted to England by crusaders in the early 12th century. In the early 13th century, Alberic of Trois-Fontaines, relying on William of Malmesbury and a misreading of William of Tyre's History of Deeds Done Beyond the Sea, dated the conquest to 1059. The chronicler Ibn al-Athir puts the original Turkoman conquest under Atsiz ibn Uwaq in the year 1070–1071, but as Jerusalem was briefly regained by the Fatimids it had to be reconquered by Atsiz in 1076. It was on the second occasion that he massacred the Fatimid garrison.

The second written source is the surviving diptychs of the patriarchate, which were maintained as late as the 13th century. Whereas William has Sophronius succeeding Nicephorus I, in the diptychs there is an intervening bishop, Joannicius, not known from any other source. Both sources agree that he was succeeded by Euthymius I. Nicephorus was patriarch in 1036, when reconstruction of the Church of the Holy Sepulchre (destroyed in 1009) was completed. Euthymius was patriarch by 1083.

In the 20th century, English archaeologists discovered a lead seal of Sophronius in Winchester. On one side of the seal is depicted the Harrowing of Hell and on the other side is Sophronius' name and title: "Sophronius by the mercy of God Patriarch of Jerusalem". A second seal has also been found. The second seal is in very poor condition and may be a contemporary forgery. According to Donald Nicol, it may be that Sophronius' seal was brought to Winchester by a returning English pilgrim. Philip Grierson considers this unlikely, arguing that it probably came to England attached to an original letter from Sophronius, perhaps confirming a penitential pilgrimage, authenticating a relic or seeking prayers for the church in Jerusalem.

Two further written sources mention Sophronius, but their authenticity is suspect. A 15th-century forgery, the Pseudo-Ingulfian Historia Croylandensis, claims that Abbot Ingulf of Crowland travelled to Jerusalem with the Great German Pilgrimage of 1064–1065, where the pilgrims were greeted upon their arrival by Sophronius with cymbals and a light show. Although Ingulf did go on a pilgrimage to Jerusalem, this account contains numerous anachronisms and mistakes. The name of the patriarch was probably cribbed from William of Malmesbury and no value can be placed in its connecting Sophronius (or Ingulf) with the Great German Pilgrimage. Although the Historia Croylandensis is apocryphal, it is plausible that Sophronius was patriarch in 1064–1065.

The other questionable source is a copy of a charter of donation made by a pilgrim from the Rouergue in 1053. According to the document, Odilus, son of Rudolph, donated a tenth of all his property to the Holy Sepulchre for the sake of his soul and that of his wife, Caecilia. Sophronius was the patriarch who received the donation.

== Sources ==
- Biddle, Martin (1999). The Tomb of Christ. Sutton Publishing.
- Gil, Moshe (1997). A History of Palestine, 634–1099. Cambridge University Press.
- Grierson, Philip (1985). "The Dates of Patriarch Sophronius II of Jerusalem (post 1048–1076/1083)". Revue des études byzantines. 43: 231–235.
- Grierson, Philip (2023). "Byzantine Seals". In Martin Biddle (ed.). The Winchester Mint and Coins and Related Finds from the Excavations of 1961–71. Archaeopress. pp. 680–688.
- Laurent, Vitalien (1964). "Un sceau inédit du patriarche de Jérusalem Sophrone II trouvé à Winchester". Numismatic Circular. 72: 49–50.
- Nicol, Donald M. (1974). "Byzantium and England". Balkan Studies. 15 (2): 179–203. ISSN 2241-1674.
