= Taqarrub =

Egyptian court slave

Taqarrub (died 1024) was an Egyptian court slave. She was the personal slave and confidant of princess-regent Sitt al-Mulk, and was active as her spy.

A victim of the slave trade, she was sold to the Fatimid harem, where she was selected to become the personal servant of al-Sayyida al-Aziziyya, the Christian Byzantine-Sicilian favorite slave concubine of Caliph al-Aziz Billah. When her enslaver died, she became the property and personal attendant of her former enslavers daughter, princess Sitt al-Mulk.

Taqarrub eventually became the personal favorite and confidant of Sitt al-Mulk, who became the de facto regent in 1021. As a non-Muslim slave, she was not subjected to the sex segregated seclusion of the Fatimid harem but had greater amount of free mobility, being able to move about outside of the harem, in the city and between the different royal palaces. Sitt al-Mulk used Taqarrub as her personal information agent, and she is described as the chief spy of Sitt al-Mulk and the de facto chief of her information agency. When Sitt al-Mulk became regent and became more careful of who she trusted, Taqarrub is described as one of her few confidants. As a person, Taqarrub is described as thorough, good humoured and well mannered.

Taqarrub was well awarded for her position as favorite and left a fortune on her death in 1024. She willed her fortune to the slave girl al-Maliha, but it was confiscated by the crown.
