= Nicodemus of Mammola =

10th-century Calabrian saint

Saint Nicodemus of Mammola
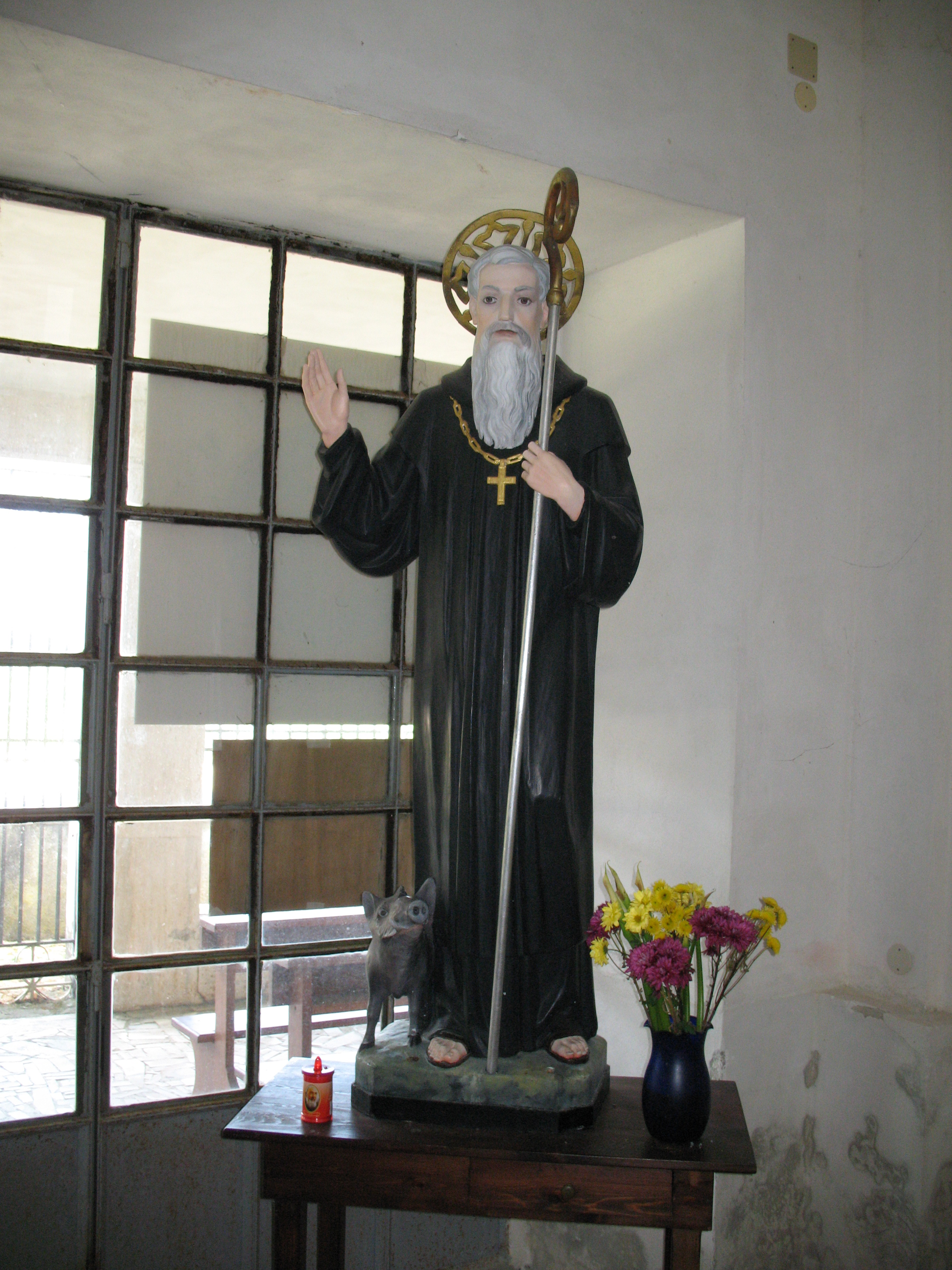
- Venerated in: Catholic Church
- Feast: March 12, March 25
- Patronage: Mammola

Saint Nicodemus of Mammola (or of Cirò) (Italian: San Nicodemo da Cirò) (ca. 900—March 25, 990 AD) is venerated as a saint in Calabria. His exact place of birth is unknown but has been identified as Ypsicron (present-day Cirò). Nicodemus’ parents were named Theophanus and Pandia, and they entrusted their son's spiritual education to a priest named Galato (Galatone). Early on, Nicodemus was attracted to the monastic life, and wished to join the ascetics who had established themselves in the zone known as the Mercurion, on the cliffs of the Pollino in Calabria.

He was at first refused entry into the community by the austere abbot Saint Fantinus (Fantino), who did not think Nicodemus could endure the penances and mortifications, but eventually the abbot relented. The reputation for holiness and austerity of these Calabrian monks, whose number included Saint Nilus of Rossano (San Nilo di Rossano), was such that they received praise by Orestes, patriarch of Jerusalem.

Eventually, Nicodemus withdrew to Mount Cellerano (or Kellerano, today San Nicodemo) in the area known as Locride, where his fame attracted a new community of monks there. This community was threatened by Muslim raids, and so Nicodemus relocated to Gerace and thence to Mammola, where a monastery was later established. He died at an advanced age on March 25, 990.

== Veneration ==
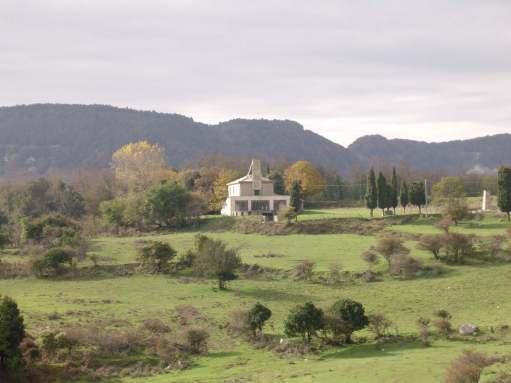
Sanctuary of San Nicodemo, Mammola.

Miracles were reported at Nicodemus’ tomb, and he was considered a saint. In 1080, under the Normans, the small oratory on the site was transformed into a larger church. The monastery at Mammola was also restored and privileges and assets were granted to it. Nicodemus' relics were translated to a new church at Mammola in 1580. Nicodemus was proclaimed patron of the city in 1630, and the feast day was established as March 12.
