= Joseph II of Jerusalem =

Joseph II of Jerusalem was the patriarch of the Church of Jerusalem from 981 to 983. Little is known of his life. It was during his episcopate that Sadaqah Ibn Bishr, the Patriarchal syncellus, was able to complete the renovation of the Church of the Holy Sepulchre that had been damaged by fire during riots in 966.

Joseph was a philosopher and a physician as well as a generous almsgiver.

In 985, he, like Christodulus II earlier, died in Cairo.

Religious titles
Preceded by Thomas II until 978 (then vacant)	Patriarch of Jerusalem; 981-983	Succeeded by Orestes
