= Isa ibn Nasturus ibn Surus =

Isa ibn Nasturus ibn Surus was a Coptic Egyptian scribe who served as vizier of the Fatimid Caliphate in 993–996 under al-Aziz Billah. He was executed by Caliph al-Hakim in 1000.

== Sources ==
- al-Imad, Leila S. (1990). The Fatimid Vizierate (979-1172). Berlin: Klaus Schwarz Verlag. ISBN 3-922968-82-1.

Preceded by Ja'far ibn al-Furat	Vizier of the Fatimid Caliphate; 993–996	Succeeded by al-Hasan ibn Ammar
