= Ibn al-Qass =

Iranian mystic and scholar (894–946)

- ابن القاص

Personal life
- Born: 894 Unknown
- Died: 946 Tarsus (in present-day Turkey)
- Resting place: Shambūq cemetery
- Era: 10th century
- Main interest(s): Fiqh, Usul al-Fiqh
- Notable work: Adab al-Qadi

Religious life
- Religion: Islam
- Jurisprudence: Shafi'i
- Movement: Sunni
- Profession: Mysticism and Shafi'i school

Muslim leader
- Teacher: Abu al-'Abbas ibn Surayj
- Students: Abu 'Ali al-Zajjaji

Abul Abbas Ahmad ibn Abi Ahmad al-Tabari known as Ibn al-Qass (894–946) was an Iranian mystic and Shafi'i scholar, judge and preacher of Tarsus. It is mentioned in the book Siyar A'lam al-Nubala' said about him that Imam, the jurist and judge.

== Books ==
- Dala'il al-qibla, Arabic manuscript was also published in Frankfurt in 1987 by Prof. Fuat Sezgin
- Judge etiquette
