= Al-Quda'i =

Muḥammad ibn Salāma al-Quḍā'ī

Personal life
- Born: Abū 'Abdallāh Muḥammad ibn Salāmah ibn Ja'far al-Quḍā'i
- Died: 1062 Fustat, Egypt
- Known for: Light in the Heavens, The Treasury of Virtues
- Occupation: Judge, preacher and historian

Religious life
- Religion: Islam

Muḥammad ibn Salāma al-Quḍā'ī (died 454/1062) was a Shafi'i Sunni judge, preacher, and historian belonging to the Arab tribe of Quda'a. He was Iranian by birth, and later lived, worked, and died in Egypt.

Al-Quḍā'ī is known as the author of a seven important works and several others, most important of which are Light in the Heavens and The Treasury of Virtues, which are collections of sermons, hadiths, sayings and other transmitted teachings of Muhammad and of Ali, respectively. One of his original manuscripts has been preserved, a prophetic biography.

== Career ==
Al-Quḍā'ī was a scribe in the chancery under the vizier Ali ibn Ahmad al-Jarjara'i (died 1045). Born in Baghdad, he was the scribe, some say deputy, of the vizier. He was in the chancery at the same time as the scholar al-Mu'ayyad fi'l-Din al-Shirazi (died 1078). He served under the Fatimids as a judge over the Sunni population. He performed the Hajj in 1053. In 1055, he made a journey to Byzantium as emissary of the caliph.

He earned great respect for his scholarship, particularly regarding hadith, and many hadith works include him as one of their transmitters. The Shafiʿi jurist Abu Tahir al-Silafi (died 1180) said of him, "His fame absolves me from lengthy expositions... he is counted among the trustworthy and reliable transmitters." According to his student Ali ibn Makula, "He was a master of many different sciences... I do not know anyone in Egypt who approaches his stature."

== Work ==
Apart from his work on Muhammad, al-Quḍā'ī also wrote a terse history of the prophets and caliphs. He said in the introduction that he had observed brevity, but that it was "amply sufficient for entertainment and conversation." In some cases, his history of a caliph would give little more than a short character sketch, the names of his wives and children, and names of officials during his rule.

Al-Quḍā'ī's history of the Fatimids was used by al-Maqrizi and others in later works. His description of Fustat before its decline and ruin after his death was a key resource for al-Maqrizi in understanding the former topography of the city. He also wrote a pamphlet that contained some of the best-known Maliki laws.

His book of the parables and teachings of the Prophet, a hadith collection, was widely read. Four Morisco versions from Spain are known, three from Almonacid. One is in Arabic, one only in aljamiado and two are bilingual.

His work on the Prophet's life has not been examined. It was the basis for a work by Shīrawayh al-Daylamī that was criticized by ibn Taymiyyah for fanciful and adulatory statements about Muhammad, which indicates that the work by al-Quḍā'ī was also concerned more with the Prophet as an exemplary man than as a religious and political leader.

== Bibliography ==
His recorded works include:

- The Blazing Star - a collection of sayings ascribed to Muhammad
- A Treasury of Virtues - a collection of saying by Ali
- Al-Qudai's History - prophets and caliphs up to the caliph al-Zahir
- The merits of al-Shāfi'ī - on the founder of the legal school (lost)
- Compendium of Teachers - list of hadith sources used by al-Quḍā'ī (lost)
- A topography of Cairo
- Qu'ran Commentary (lost)
- The Preacher's Pearl and the Worshiper's Treasure (possible authorship)
- Details of Reports and Gardens of Lessons - wisdom sayings (possible authorship)
