= Destruction of the Church of the Holy Sepulchre =

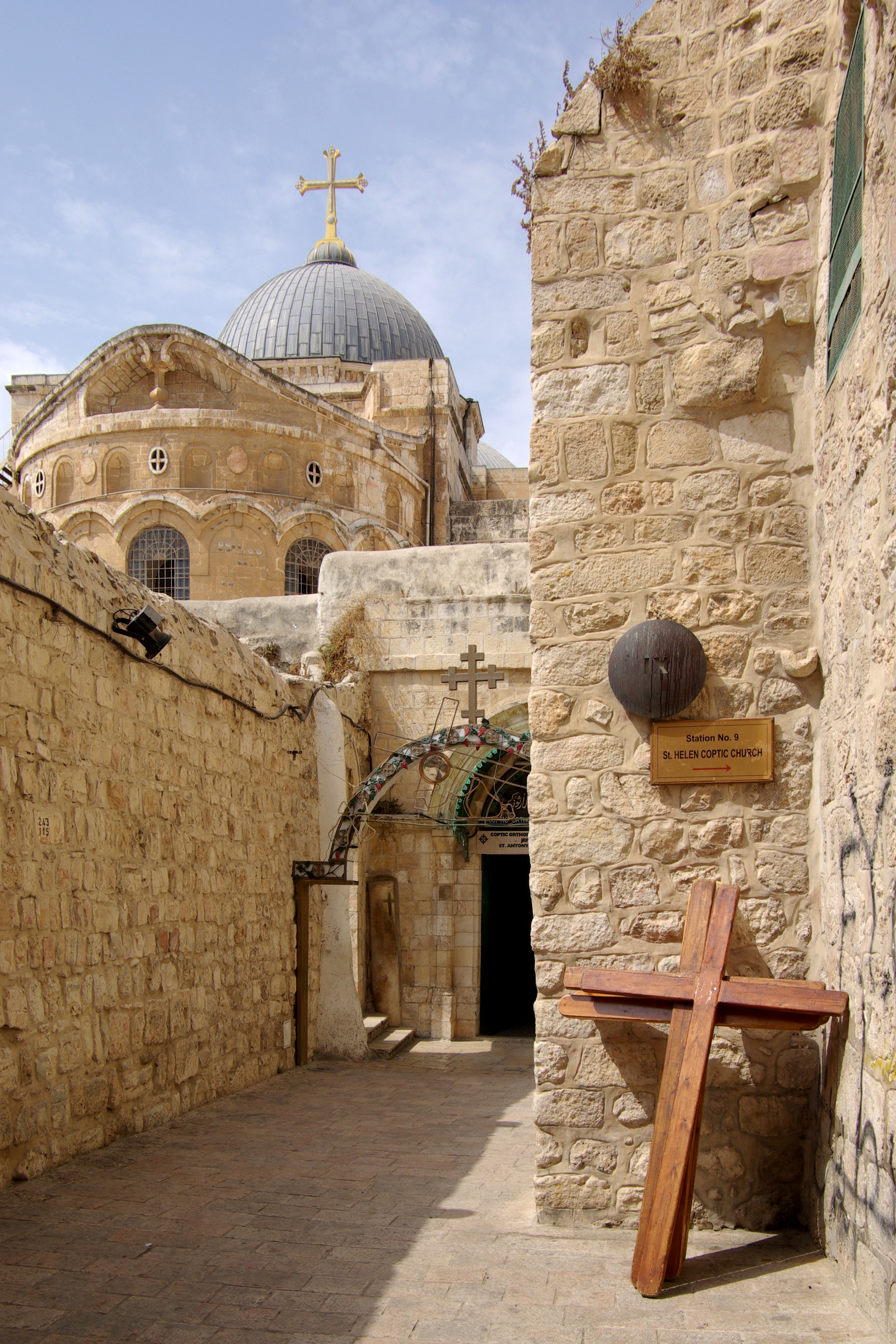
Ninth Station outside the Church of the Holy Sepulchre

The Church of the Holy Sepulchre, other churches, synagogues, Torah scrolls and other non-Muslim religious artifacts and buildings in and around Jerusalem, were destroyed starting on 28 September 1009 on the orders of the Fatimid Caliph Al-Hakim bi-Amr Allah, known by his critics as "the mad Caliph" or "Nero of Egypt". His son, the Fatimid Caliph Al-Zahir, allowed the Byzantines to rebuild the Church of the Holy Sepulchre in 1027–28. The construction of a much diminished ensemble was wrapped up by 1048. This was the second of the two times the church was seriously damaged, the first being in 614 during the Byzantine–Sasanian War of 602–628.

== First desecration ==
The church was set aflame by the Persian Sasanians during the conquest of Jerusalem in 614, as were many churches that suffered from destruction. The conquest had also resulted in the seizure of important Christian treasures and relics from the city, including the relic traditionally identified as the True Cross which was taken to the Sasanid territory.

A diagram of the Church of the Holy Sepulchre showing traditional site of Calvary and the Tomb of Jesus

== Prelude to the second desecration ==
At Easter in 1008, Al-Hakim started tightening controls on religious freedoms in Jerusalem, forbidding Christians from making their annual Palm Sunday procession from Bethany. Al-Hakim had a demonstrated distaste for the religious practice of both Christians and Jews in the city of Jerusalem.

== Holy Sepulchre destruction ==
On 29 September 1009, Al-Hakim ordered a governor of Ramla called Yarukh to demolish the area around Constantine's original Church of the Holy Sepulchre. Yarukh, along with his son Yusuf, Al-Husayn ibn Zahir al-Wazzan and Abu'l-Farawis Al-Dayf, were among those who began destroying various buildings. Some Christians believe the Church of the Holy Sepulchre is built on the site of Calvary or Golgotha, where Jesus was crucified, near a rock-cut room that Helena and Macarius identified as the location of the resurrection. The destruction was chronicled by Yahya ibn Sa'id of Antioch who noted it "cast down as far as the foundations" and the rock cut tomb was demolished in the attempt to "cause all trace of it to disappear". All sacred remains and holy relics were "completely annihilated". Iron hammers were ineffectual against the bedrock foundations of the tomb, so they resorted to burning it with fire.

== Wider desecration ==
The desecration was not only carried out on Christian sites in and around Jerusalem. In campaigns of 1011 and 1013–14, Al-Hakim continued his campaign of destruction against Jewish synagogues and Torah scrolls along with churches all over Syria. Unlike other Fatimids, Al-Hakim launched persecutions against dhimmis that lasted throughout his reign. Christians were made to wear crosses and Jews forced to wear wooden blocks around their necks. He only stopped for fear of retaliatory attacks on mosques in Christian lands.

== European reaction ==
When the news reached Europe, Christians were horrified; Pope Sergius IV sent a circular letter to all churches, calling for a holy fight in the Middle East, and expulsion of Muslims from the Holy Land. The events would later be recalled by Pope Urban II, in his preaching for the Crusade at Clermont. Although the crusades happened almost a century after the desecration (and were motivated by various other complex political intrigues), with the church rebuilt and pilgrimages from Europe resuming during that period, it was still very much in the public mind as a cause. It was considered so by William of Tyre.

Adémar de Chabannes wrote about the events, drawing associations between Al-Hakim (who is considered important to the Druze faith and self-proclaimed himself to be the representative of the Mahdi) and the Antichrist, blaming the Jews for inspiring his desecration of the Holy Sepulchre. Rodulfus Glaber also wrote, circa 1040, a history of the events blaming French Jews from Orléans, claiming that they had sent a message to the caliph via a Jew disguised as a pilgrim. The message was said to have been hidden inside a hollow staff, and urged the caliph to destroy the sepulchre lest Christians take over his empire otherwise. Rodulfus portrayed Al-Hakim as gullible, and firmly cast blame on the Jews. This led to outbreaks of antisemitism and violence against Jews across Europe; King Robert II of France ordered forced conversions, and the Holy Roman Emperor Henry II expelled Jews from Mainz, condemning Judaism as heresy.

== Arabic chroniclers ==
Al-Qalanisi and Al-Djawizi suggested that Al-Hakim was angered by the supposed miracle of the Holy Fire, which had been reported as early as the 9th century. Taqi al-Din Ahmad ibn 'Ali al-Maqrizi suggested that it was a fraudulent miracle caused by the use of black elder and quicksilver. Bar Hebraeus and Severus ibn al-Muqaffa report accounts of a Christian monk named John who had become disenchanted with the patriarch of Jerusalem, and had informed the caliph of the fraud to disparage him. Severas notes the patriarch was arrested at the time of the sepulchre's destruction and Adémar confirms he was killed. The patriarch of Jerusalem who was secretly put to death over the matter was Arsenius, also a patriarch of Alexandria and apparently an uncle of Al-Hakim.

== Motivations ==
Al-Hakim's motivations for the desecration are unclear and have been variously attested. John J. Saunders states that his anti-Christian policies were intended to mitigate the discontent aroused by his grandfather's liberal attitude towards non-Muslims. There were also suspicions of Christians colluding with Bedouin tribes to undermine Fatimid power. It was possibly in retaliation for Byzantine attacks. In Master of the Age, historian Paul E. Walker writes that in the popular imagination of the era, Al-Hakim's actions were interpreted by some Muslims as "doing what a Muslim leader should do" by destroying the pre-Islamic cultural heritage as part of a policy seen to be "commanding the good and forbidding the bad". William of Tyre's account claimed that Al-Hakim had been born to a Christian mother, and that he desecrated Jerusalem in order to dispel suspicions of Christian allegiance. Some note Al-Hakim's shifting religious allegiances finally starting a new Abrahamic religion (Druze). Other sources simply posit that he was mentally disturbed.
