= Al-Zahir li-I'zaz Din Allah =

Fatimid caliph and Isma'ili Imam from 1021 to 1036

al-Zahir li-I'zaz Din Allah الظاهر لإعزاز دين الله
- Caliph; Amir al-Mu'minīn
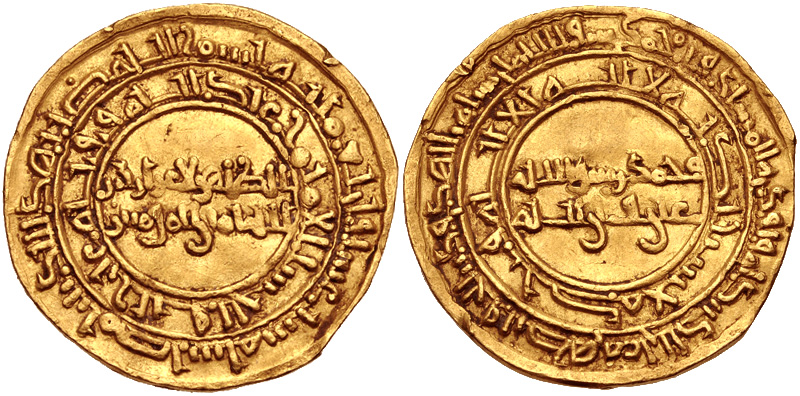
- Gold dinar of al-Zahir

Imam–Caliph of the Fatimid Caliphate
- Reign: 1021–1036
- Predecessor: al-Hakim bi-Amr Allah
- Successor: al-Mustansir Billah
- Born: 26 June 1005; Cairo, Fatimid Egypt
- Died: 13 June 1036 (aged 30); Cairo, Fatimid Egypt
- Spouse: Rasad, amongst others
- Issue: al-Mustansir Billah
- Dynasty: Fatimid
- Father: al-Hakim bi-Amr Allah
- Mother: Amīna Ruqayya (concubine)
- Religion: Isma'ili Shia Islam

Abū al-Ḥasan ʿAlī ibn al-Ḥākim (Arabic: أبو الحسن علي ابن الحاكم; 20 June 1005 – 13 June 1036), better known with his regnal name al-Ẓāhir li-Iʿzāz Dīn Allāh (Arabic: الظاهر لإعزاز دين الله, lit. 'He Who Appears Openly to Strengthen the Religion of God'), was the seventh Imam–caliph of the Fatimid dynasty (1021–1036). Al-Zahir assumed the caliphate after the disappearance of his father al-Hakim bi-Amr Allah.

== Biography ==
At the time of al-Hakim's disappearance on 14 February 1021, his sister, Sitt al-Mulk, took the reins of power. She disregarded the previous appointment of a cousin, Abd al-Rahim ibn Ilyas, as heir apparent by al-Hakim, and instead raised al-Hakim's 16-year-old son Ali to the throne. Ali received the public oath of allegiance on 28 March, with the regnal name al-Zāhir li-Iʿzāz Dīn Allāh. His rival, Abu'l-Qasim, was recalled from Damascus, where he was serving as governor, to Cairo, where he died—reportedly by suicide—a few months later.

Until her death in February 1023, the government was conducted by Sitt al-Mulk, who according to historian Thierry Bianquis proved "a true stateswoman". He was the first Fatimid monarch to actively shift the responsibility of governing onto his officials, inaugurating a trend that would eventually lead to the complete political impotence of the Fatimid caliphs.

Under this regime, the Fātimid state slipped into crisis - in Egypt, famine and plague led to anarchy in the years 1023–1025, and in Palestine and Syria, there was a revolt amongst the Sunni Bedouin (1024–1029). The coalition of rebels was fragmented by Fātimid diplomacy, after which General Anushtakin al-Dizbari was able to defeat it militarily.

Meanwhile, in 1028 one of the governing circle, ʻAlī ibn Ahmad Jarjarai, was able to eliminate his colleagues and take over the office of vizir, which he managed to retain until 1045. He enjoyed good relations with the Byzantine Empire, even though the suzerainty over Aleppo was constantly disputed, occasionally coming to arms. To improve relations with Byzantine and the Christian subjects of the Fatimid realm, the rebuilding of the Church of the Holy Sepulchre, destroyed in 1009, was authorised under his caliphate in a treaty with the Byzantine Emperor Romanus III. Actual building work, funded by the Byzantines, was not undertaken until 1042.

Al-Zahir is credited with supporting a full-scale rehabilitation of Al-Aqsa islamic structures following the 1033 earthquake, the destroyed the Qibli (Al-Aqsa) Mosque was reconstructed with an elaborate mosaic program, and the Dome of the Rock was repaired, he also rebuilt Jerusalem's city walls.

=== Persecution of Druze ===
For the next seven years, the Druze faced extreme persecution by the new caliph, al-Zahir, who wanted to eradicate the faith completely. This was the result of a power struggle inside of the Fatimid empire in which the Druze were viewed with suspicion because of their refusal to recognize the new caliph as their Ismaili Imam. Many spies, mainly the followers of al-Darazi, joined the Muwahhidun movement in order to infiltrate the Druze community. The spies set about agitating trouble and soiling the reputation of the Druze. This resulted in friction with the new caliph who clashed militarily with the Druze community. The clashes ranged from Antioch to Alexandria, where tens of thousands of Druze were slaughtered by the Fatimid army. The largest massacre was at Antioch, where 5,000 prominent Druze were killed, followed by that of Aleppo. As a result, the faith went underground, in hope of survival, as those captured were either forced to renounce their faith or be killed. Druze survivors "were found principally in southern Lebanon and Syria". In 1038, two years after the death of al-Zahir, the Druze movement was able to resume because the new leadership that replaced him had friendly political ties with at least one prominent Druze leader.

=== Death and succession ===
The period of his Imamate was fourteen years. After ʻAlī died of the plague 13 June 1036, his son became the eighth caliph under the regnal name of al-Mustansir.

== See also ==
- Family tree of Muhammad#Family tree linking prophets to Imams
- List of Ismaili imams
- List of rulers of Egypt

== Sources ==
- Bianquis, Thierry (1989). Damas et la Syrie sous la domination fatimide (359-468/969-1076): essai d'interprétation de chroniques arabes médiévales. Deuxième tome (in French). Damascus: Institut français de Damas. ISBN 978-2-35159131-4.
- Bianquis, Thierry (2002). "al-Ẓāhir li-Iʿzāz Dīn Allāh". In Bearman, P. J.; Bianquis, Th.; Bosworth, C. E.; van Donzel, E. & Heinrichs, W. P. (eds.). The Encyclopaedia of Islam, Second Edition. Volume XI: W–Z. Leiden: E. J. Brill. pp. 391–392. doi:10.1163/1573-3912_islam_SIM_8080. ISBN 978-90-04-12756-2.
- Brett, Michael (2017). The Fatimid Empire. The Edinburgh History of the Islamic Empires. Edinburgh: Edinburgh University Press. ISBN 978-0-7486-4076-8.
- Canard, Marius (1965). "D̲j̲arrāḥids". In Lewis, B.; Pellat, Ch. & Schacht, J. (eds.). The Encyclopaedia of Islam, Second Edition. Volume II: C–G. Leiden: E. J. Brill. pp. 482–485. OCLC 495469475.
- Cappel, Andrew J. (1994). "The Byzantine Response to the ʿArab (10th–11th Centuries)". Byzantinische Forschungen. 20. A. Hakkert: 113–132.
- Gil, Moshe (1997) [1983]. A History of Palestine, 634–1099. Translated by Ethel Broido. Cambridge: Cambridge University Press. ISBN 0-521-59984-9.
- Halm, Heinz (2003). Die Kalifen von Kairo: Die Fatimiden in Ägypten, 973–1074 [The Caliphs of Cairo: The Fatimids in Egypt, 973–1074] (in German). Munich: C. H. Beck. ISBN 3-406-48654-1.
- Kennedy, Hugh (2004) [1986]. The Prophet and the Age of the Caliphates: The Islamic Near East from the 6th to the 11th Century (Second ed.). Harlow: Longman. ISBN 978-0-582-40525-7.
- Lev, Yaacov (2003). "Turks in the Political and Military Life of Eleventh-Century Egypt and Syria". In Hidemitsu, Kuroki (ed.). The Influence of Human Mobility in Muslim Societies. Kegan Paul. pp. 43–62. ISBN 0710308027.

al-Zahir li-I'zaz Din Allah Fatimid dynasty Born: 20 June 1005 Died: 13 June 1036
Regnal titles
Preceded by al-Hakim bi-Amr Allah	Fatimid Caliph; 13 February 1021 – 13 June 1036	Succeeded by al-Mustansir Billah
Shia Islam titles
Preceded by al-Hakim bi-Amr Allah	Imam of Isma'ilism; 13 February 1021 – 13 June 1036	Succeeded by al-Mustansir Billah
