= Al-Hakim bi-Amr Allah =

6th Fatimid caliph (r. 996–1021) and 16th Ismaili Imam

al-Hakim bi-Amr Allah الحاكم بأمر الله
- Caliph; Amir al-Mu'minīn
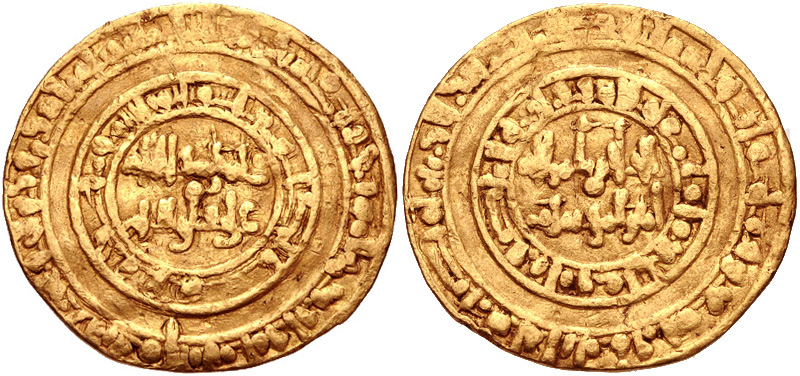
- Gold dinar of al-Hakim minted in 391 AH (1000/1001 CE)

Imam–Caliph of the Fatimid Caliphate
- Reign: 14 October 996 – 13 February 1021
- Predecessor: al-Aziz Billah
- Successor: al-Zahir li-I'zaz Din Allah
- Born: al-Mansur; 13 August 985; Cairo, Fatimid Egypt
- Issue: al-Zahir li-I'zaz Din Allah; Sitt Misr
Names
- Abu 'Ali al-Mansur al-Ḥākim bi-Amr Allāh
- Dynasty: Fatimid
- Father: al-Aziz Billah
- Religion: Ismaili Shia Islam
- Disappeared: 13 February 1021 (aged 35); Mokattam, Cairo, Fatimid Egypt

Abu Ali al-Mansur (Arabic: أبو علي المنصور, romanized: Abū ʿAlī al-Manṣūr; 13 August 985 – 13 February 1021), better known by his regnal name al-Hakim bi-Amr Allah (Arabic: الحاكم بأمر الله, romanized: al-Ḥākim bi-Amr Allāh, lit. 'The Ruler by the Order of God'), was the sixth Fatimid caliph and 16th Ismaili imam (996–1021). Al-Hakim is an important figure in a number of Shia Ismaili sects, such as the world's 15 million Nizaris and 1–2 million Musta'lis, in addition to 2 million Druze.

Histories of al-Hakim can prove controversial, as conflicting views of his life and legacy exist. Historian Paul Walker writes "Ultimately, both views of him, the mad and despotic tyrant (like Germanic and Roman despots) irrationally given to killing those around him on a whim, and the ideal supreme ruler, divinely ordained and chosen, whose every action was just and righteous, were to persist, the one among his enemies and those who rebelled against him, and the other in the hearts of true believers, who, while perhaps perplexed by events, nonetheless remained avidly loyal to him to the end." Appraisals of the more controversial accounts of al-Hakim's life and rule have earned him such monikers as "the Nero of Egypt", and "the Mad Caliph".

== Background and family ==
Born in 985 CE in Cairo, Abu 'Ali al-Mansur was the first Fatimid ruler to have been born in Egypt. Abu 'Ali al-Mansur had been proclaimed as heir-apparent (wali al-'ahd) in 993 CE and succeeded his father al-Aziz Billah (975–996) at the age of eleven, on 14 October 996, with the caliphal title of al-Hakim Bi-Amr Allah. Al-Ḥākim is reported to have had blue eyes flecked with reddish gold.

=== Lineage ===
Al-Ḥākim was born on Thursday, 3 Rabi' al-awwal in AD 985 (AH 375). His father, caliph al-'Azīz bil-Lāh, had two consorts. One was an umm al-walad who is only known by the title as-Sayyidah al-'Azīziyyah or al-'Azīzah (d. 385/995). She was a Melkite Christian whose two brothers were appointed patriarchs of the Melkite Church by Caliph al-'Azīz. Different sources say either one of her brothers or her father was sent by al-'Azīz as an ambassador to Sicily.

As-Sayyidah al-'Azīzah is considered to be the mother of Sitt al-Mulk, one of the most famous women in Islamic history, who had a stormy relationship with her half-brother al-Ḥākim and may have had him assassinated. Some, such as the Crusader chronicler William of Tyre, claimed that al-'Azīzah was also the mother of Caliph al-Ḥākim, though most historians dismiss this. William of Tyre went so far as to claim that al-Ḥākim's destruction of the Church of the Holy Sepulchre in 1009 was due to his eagerness to disprove taunts that he was a Christian born of a Christian woman. By contrast, the chronicler al-Musabbihi recounts that in 981, al-Ḥākim's Muslim mother sought the aid of an imprisoned Islamic sage named ibn al-Washa and asked him to pray for her son who had fallen ill. The sage wrote the entire Qur'an in the inner surface of a bowl and bade her wash her son out of it. When al-Ḥākim recovered, she demanded the release of the sage in gratitude. Her request was granted and the sage and his associates were freed from prison.

Druze sources claim that al-Ḥākim's mother was the daughter of 'Abdu l-Lāh, one of al-Mu'izz li-Din Allah's sons and therefore al-'Azīz's niece. Historians such as Delia Cortese are critical of this claim:

[I]t is more likely that this woman was in fact a wife of al-Hakim, rather than his mother. It could be argued that the Druzes' emphasis on al-Hakim's descent from an endogamic union served the doctrinal purpose of reinforcing the charisma genealogically transmitted with the "holy family", thereby enhancing the political and doctrinal status they bestow upon al-Hakim.

The only direct textual testimony towards the identity of al-Ḥākim's mother comes from the Coptic source the History of the Patriarchs of Alexandria. It states that she was a Melkite Christian concubine, and that she intervened with al-Aziz Billah to appoint her brother Arsenius as Melkite cosmopolitan of Cairo and Fustat. However, this Melkite concubine is unlikely to be the same woman as as-Sayyidah al-'Azīzah. Despite the latter's notability, there is no mention of al-Ḥākim in the chronicles' detailed report on her death in December 995, and a Melkite report from 1009 mentions the Caliph's still living mother. The text's suggestion that al-Ḥākim had a Melkite mother may have been influenced by the conflict between Egyptian Christians in that period, as the Copts could have intended to use her alleged involvement in politics to explain their own problems.

=== Consort and issue ===
The mother of al-Hakim's heir Ali al-Zahir li-I'zaz Din Allah was the umm al-walad Amīna Ruqayya, daughter to the late prince Abd Allah, son of al-Mu'izz. Some see her as the same as the woman in the prediction reported by al-Hamidi which held "that in 390/1000 al-Hakim would choose an orphan girl of good stock brought up [by?] his father al-Aziz and that she would become the mother of his successor." While the chronicler al-Maqrizi claims that al-Hakim's stepsister Sitt al-Mulk was hostile to Amīna, other sources say she gave her and her child refuge when they were fleeing al-Hakim's persecution. Some sources say al-Hakim married the jariya (young female servant) known by the title as-Sayyidah but historians are unsure if this is just another name for Amīna.

Besides al-Zahir, al-Hakim had a daughter named Sitt Misr (d. 455/1063) who was said to be a princess of generous patronage and a noble character.

== Reign ==
In 996, al-Ḥākim's father Caliph al-'Azīz began a trip to visit Syria (which was held by the Fatimids only by force of arms and was under pressure from the Byzantines). The Caliph fell ill at the beginning of the trip at Bilbeis and lay in sickbed for several days. He suffered from "stone with pains in the bowels." When he felt that his end was nearing he charged Qadi Muhammad ibn an-Nu'man and General Abū Muhammad al-Hasan ibn 'Ammar to take care of al-Ḥākim, who was then only eleven. He then spoke to his son. Al-Ḥākim later recalled the event:

"I found him with nothing on his body but rags and bandages. I kissed him, and he pressed me to his bosom, exclaiming: "How I grieve for thee, beloved of my heart," and tears flowed from his eyes. He then said: "Go, my master, and play, for I am well." I obeyed and began to amuse myself with sports such as are usual with boys, and soon after God took him to himself. Barjawan [the treasurer] then hastened to me, and seeing me on the top of a sycamore tree, exclaimed: "Come down, my boy; may God protect you and us all." When I descended he placed on my head the turban adorned with jewels, kissed the ground before me, and said: "Hail to the Commander of the faithful, with the mercy of God and his blessing." He then led me out in that attire and showed me to all the people, who kissed the ground before me and saluted me with the title of Khalif."

On the following day, he and his new court proceeded from Bilbays to Cairo, behind the camel bearing his father's body, and with the dead Caliph's feet protruding from the litter. They arrived shortly before evening prayer and his father was buried the next evening next to the tomb of his predecessor al-Mu'īzz. Al-Ḥākim was sworn in by Barjawan, a "white eunuch whom al-'Azīz had appointed as Ustad 'tutor'."

Because it had been unclear whether he would inherit his father's position, this successful transfer of power was a demonstration of the stability of the Fatimid dynasty. Al-Hakim's father had intended the eunuch Barjawan to act as regent until al-Hakim was old enough to rule by himself. Ibn 'Ammar and Qadi Muhammad ibn Nu'man were to assist in the guardianship of the new caliph.

Nevertheless, the Kutama Berbers seized the chance to recover their dominant position in the state, which had eroded under al-Aziz due to the influx of Turkish and Daylamite mercenaries from the Islamic East (the Mashāriqa, "Easterners"). They compelled the underage al-Hakim to dismiss the Christian vizier 'Īsa ibn Nestorius (who was executed shortly after) and appoint their leader Ibn Ammar to head the government, with the title of wāsiṭa ("intermediary") rather than full vizier. At the time the office of sifāra "secretary of state" was also combined within that office. Ibn 'Ammar then took the title of Amīn ad-Dawla "the one trusted in the empire". This was the first time that the term "empire" was associated with the Fatimid state. Ibn Ammar's rule quickly descended into a Berber tyranny: he immediately began staffing the government with Berbers, who engaged in a virtual pillaging of the state coffers. The Berbers' attempts to exclude the other interest groups from power—not only the Turks and the other ethnic contingents of the army, but also the civilian bureaucracy, whose salary was cut—alienated not only the Mashāriqa, but alarmed Barjawan as well. Barjawan contacted the Fatimid governor of Damascus, the Turk Manjutakin, and invited him to march onto Egypt and depose Ibn Ammar. Manjutakin accepted, but was defeated by Ibn Ammar's troops under Sulayman ibn Ja'far ibn Falah at Ascalon and taken prisoner. Barjawan however soon found a new ally, in the person of the Kutama leader Jaysh ibn Samsam, governor of Tripoli, whom Ibn Falah dismissed and replaced with his own brother. Jaysh and Barjawan gathered a following of other dissatisfied Berber leaders, and launched an uprising in Cairo in October 997. Ibn Ammar was forced to flee, and Barjawan replaced him as wāsiṭa.

During his predominance, Barjawan managed to balance the two factions, fulfilling the demands of the Mashāriqa while taking care of the Kutama as well. In this vein, he pardoned Ibn Ammar and restored him his monthly salary of 500 gold dinars. After Bajarwan's murder on 26 March 1000, however, Caliph al-Hakim assumed the reins of government and launched a purge of the Fatimid elites, during which Ibn Ammar and many of the other Kutama leaders were executed. To ensure his own power, Hakim limited the authority and terms of office of his wasitas and viziers, of whom there were more than 15 during the remaining 20 years of his caliphate.

=== Internal unrest and groups ===
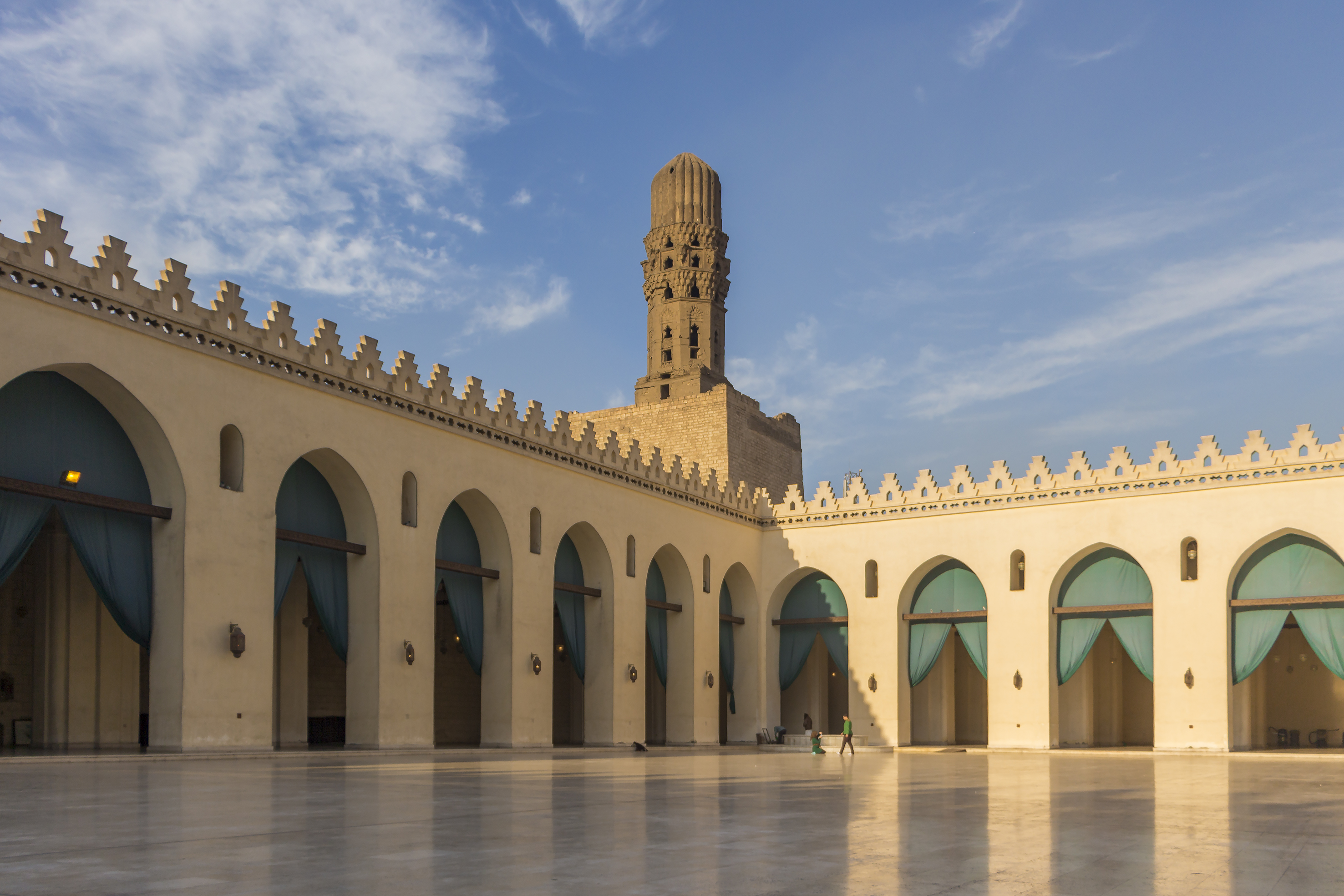
al-Hakim Mosque located in Islamic Cairo, on the east side of al-Muʿizz Street, just south of Bab al-Futuh (the northern old city gate)

Al-Hakim's reign was characterized by a general unrest. The Fatimid army was troubled by a rivalry between two opposing factions, the Turks and the Berbers. Tension grew between the Caliph and his viziers (called wasītas), and near the end of his reign, the Druze movement, a religious sect that deified al-Hakim as God manifest, began to form. Members of that sect were reported to address prayers to al-Hakim, whom they regarded as "a manifestation of God in His unity."

=== The Baghdad Manifesto ===
Alarmed by the expansion of the Fatimid dominion, the 'Abbasid caliph al-Qadir of Baghdad adopted retaliatory measures to halt the spread of Ismailism within the very seat of his realm. In particular, in 1011 he assembled a number of Sunni and Twelver Shiite scholars at his court and commanded them to declare in a written document that Hakim and his predecessors lacked genuine descent from Ali and Fatima. This so-called Baghdad Manifesto was read out in Friday mosques throughout the 'Abbasid domains accusing the Fatimids of Jewish ancestry (see List of converts to Islam). In addition, because of al-Hakim's alleged Christian mother, he was accused of being over-sympathetic to non-Muslims, giving them more privileges than they should have been given under Islamic rule. Such accusations were manifested through poetry criticizing the Fatimids. Qadir also commissioned several refutations of Ismaili doctrines, including those written by the Mu'tazili 'Ali b. Sa'id al-Istakri (1013).

=== Foreign affairs ===
Hakim confronted numerous difficulties and uprisings during his relatively long reign. While he did not lose any important territories in North Africa, the Ismaili communities there were attacked by Sunni fighters led by their influential Maliki jurists. Relations between the Fatimids and the Qarmatians also remained hostile. On the other hand, Hakim's Syrian policy was successful as he managed to extend Fatimid hegemony to the emirate of Aleppo.

Al-Hakim upheld diplomatic relations between the Fatimid Empire and many different countries. Skillful diplomacy was needed in establishing friendly, or at least neutral relations with the Byzantine Empire, which had irredentist goals in the early 11th century.

=== Disappearance and succession ===
In the final years of his reign, al-Hakim displayed a growing inclination toward asceticism and withdrew for meditation regularly. On the night of 12/13 February 1021 at the age of 35, al-Hakim left for one of his regular nocturnal meditation journeys to the Mokattam hills on the outskirts of Cairo but failed to return. A search found only his horse and bloodstained garments. His disappearance has remained a mystery.

Modern historians have assessed whether al-Hakim's sister Sitt al-Mulk may have had a hand in his disappearance, but no historic evidence has emerged that would implicate her. Al-Mulk would lead moves to declare her nephew al-Zahir li-I'zaz Din Allah as his father's successor as imam-caliph. The heir al-Hakim had designated was removed from court and al-Mulk was appointed regent for her 16-year-old nephew. After al-Zahir came of age, al-Mulk assumed positions within his administration until her death in 1023.

== al-Hakim and Ismailism ==
Al-Hakim maintained a keen interest in the organization and operation of the Fatimid Ismaili da'wa (preaching) centred in Cairo. Under his reign it was systematically intensified outside the Fatimid dominions, especially in Iraq and Persia. In Iraq, the da'is now concentrated their efforts on a number of local amirs and influential tribal chiefs with whose support they aimed to uproot the Abbasids. Foremost among the Fatimid da'is of this period operating in the eastern provinces was Hamid al-Din Kirmani, the most accomplished Ismaili theologian-philosopher of the entire Fatimid period. The activities of Kirmani and other da'is soon led to concrete results in Iraq: in 1010 the ruler of Mosul, Kufa and other towns acknowledged the suzerainty of Hakim. The 16th Fatimid imam, caliph al-Hakim bi-Amr Allah (996–1021) ordered his da'i, Harun ibn Muhammad in Yemen, to give decisions in light of Da'a'im al-Islam only.

In 1013 he completed the construction of al-Jāmiʻ al-Anwar begun by his father. Commonly known as "Hākim's Mosque", over time it fell into ruin. In the 1970s, the Dawoodi Bohras, an Ismaili Shia sect, under the leadership of Mohammed Burhanuddin, restored the then-dilapidated mosque, using new building methods and materials while maintaining as many of the architectural and artistic features as possible. Their attempts received strong criticism from some academics, conservators, and art historians who saw the effort as constructing "a new building" rather than restoration.

=== House of Knowledge ===
In the area of education and learning, one of Hakim's most important contributions was the founding in 1005 of the Dār al-ʿIlm (House of Knowledge) in Cairo. A wide range of subjects ranging from the Qur'an and hadith to philosophy and astronomy were taught at the Dār al-ʿIlm, which was equipped with a vast library. During his rule, al-Hakim provided paper, ink, pens and inkstands free of charge to all those who studied there. Access to education was made available to the public and many Fatimid da'is received at least part of their training in this major institution of learning which served the Ismaili da'wa (mission) until the downfall of the Fatimid dynasty. For more than 100 years, Dār al-ʿIlm distinguished itself as a center of learning where astronomers, mathematicians, grammarians, logicians, physicians, philologists, jurists and others conducted research, gave lectures and collaborated. All were welcomed, and it remained unfettered by political pressures or partisan influences.

=== Sessions of Wisdom ===
Hakim made the education of the Ismailis and the Fatimid da'is a priority; in his time various study sessions (majalis) were established in Cairo. Hakim provided financial support and endowments for these educational activities. The private 'wisdom sessions' (majalis al-hikma) devoted to esoteric Ismaili doctrines and reserved exclusively for initiates, now became organized so as to be accessible to different categories of participants. Al-Hakim himself often attended these sessions which were held at the Fatimid palace. The name majalis al-hikma is still used by the Druze, Nizari and Taiyabi Ismailis as the name of the building in which their religious assembly and worship is carried, often abbreviated as Majlis (session).

He would allow women to attend the house of knowledge to study so they could teach other women and their children, learning a wide range of subjects from Islam to philosophy.

=== Druze ===
Al-Hakim is a central figure in the history of the Druze religion, whose eponymous founder ad-Darazi proclaimed him as the incarnation of God in 1018. Hamza ibn Ali ibn Ahmad is considered the founder of the Druze and the primary author of the Druze manuscripts, he proclaimed that God had become human and taken the form of man, al-Hakim bi-Amr Allah.

== Interreligious relationships ==
According to the religious scholar Nissim Dana, al-Hakim's relationship with other monotheistic religions can be divided into three separate stages.

=== First period ===
From 996 to 1006 when most of the executive functions of the Khalif were performed by his advisors, the Shiite al-Hakim "behaved like the Shiite khalifs, who he succeeded, exhibiting a hostile attitude with respect to Sunni Muslims, whereas the attitude toward 'People of the Book' – Jews and Christians – was one of relative tolerance, in exchange for the jizya tax."

In 1005, al-Hakim ordered a public posting of curses against the first three Caliphs (Abu Bakr, Umar and Uthman) and against Aisha, wife of Muhammad, for denying the caliphate to Muhammad's cousin and son-in-law ʿAlī, who according to Shia beliefs, was the rightful prophetic successor.

According to historian Nissîm Dānā, al-Hakim ordered that "curses were registered against the warrior Muawiyah I, founder of the Umayyad Caliphate, and against others in the inner circle of Muhammad from the Sahabah - the compatriots of Muhammad in the way of Islam." This was in accordance with Shia practice, as laid out by Muslim scholar Ayatollah Haydari: "the followers of Ahl al-Bayt [Shias] say 'O Allah curse all of the Banu Umayya'." The Shia maintain that out of hatred for ʿAlī, Muʿawiyah ordered the Talbiyah not be said (as it was promoted by ʿAlī) and ordered people to curse him (Saʿd ibn Abi Waqqas refused to do so). The Shia hold that Muʿawiyah and all of the Umayyad caliphs (with the possible exception of Umar II) were Nasibi who "are the hypocrites for whom hatred of ʿAlī is their religion...They don't just hate ʿAlī, but they worship Allah and seek closeness to Him by hating ʿAlī."

After only two years of posting the curses, al-Hakim ended the practice. During this era, al-Hakim ordered that the inclusion of the phrase as-salāh khayr min an-nawm "prayer is preferable to sleep", which followed fajr prayer, be stopped – he saw it as a Sunni addition. In its place he ordered that ḥayyi ʿalā khayr al-ʿamal "come to the best of deeds" should be said after the summons was made. He further forbade the use of two prayers – Salāt at-Tarāwih and Salāt ad-Duha as they were believed to have been formulated by Sunni sages.

==== Religious minorities ====
In 1004 al-Hakim decreed that the Christians could no longer celebrate Epiphany or Easter. He also outlawed the use of wine (nabidh) and even other intoxicating drinks not made from grapes (fuqa) to both Muslims and non-Muslims alike. This produced a hardship for both Christians (who used wine in their religious rites) and Jews (who used it in their religious festivals).

In 1005, al-Hakim ordered that Jews and Christians follow ghiyār "the law of differentiation" – in this case, the mintaq or zunnar "belt" (Greek ζωνάριον) and imāmah "turban", both in black. In addition, Jews must wear a wooden calf necklace and Christians a heavy iron cross. In the public baths, Jews must replace the calf with a bell. In addition, women of the People of the Book had to wear two different coloured shoes, one red and one black. These remained in place until 1014 and were thematised and protested by the Arab Christian poet Sulayman al-Ghazzi in his diwan.

Following contemporary Shiite thinking, during this period al-Hakim also issued many other restrictive ordinances (sijillat). These sijillat included outlawing entrance to a public bath with uncovered loins, forbidding women from appearing in public with their faces uncovered, and closing many clubs and places of entertainment.

=== Second period ===
From 1007 to 1012 "there was a notably tolerant attitude toward the Sunnis and less zeal for Shiite Islam, while the attitude with regard to the 'People of the Book' was hostile." On 18 October 1009, al-Hakim ordered the destruction of the Holy Sepulchre and its associated buildings, apparently outraged by what he regarded as the fraud practiced by the monks in the "miraculous" Descent of the Holy Fire, celebrated annually at the church during the Easter Vigil. The chronicler Yahia noted that "only those things that were too difficult to demolish were spared." Processions were prohibited, and a few years later all of the convents and churches in Palestine were said to have been destroyed or confiscated. It was only in 1042 that the Byzantine Emperor Constantine IX undertook to reconstruct the Holy Sepulchre with the permission of al-Hakim's successor.

=== Third period ===
Al-Hakim ultimately allowed the unwilling Christian and Jewish converts to Islam to return to their faith and rebuild their ruined houses of worship. Indeed, from 1012 to 1021 al-Hakim

became more tolerant toward the Jews and Christians and hostile toward the Sunnis. Ironically he developed a particularly hostile attitude with regard to the Muslim Shiites. It was during this period, in the year 1017, that the unique religion of the Druze began to develop as an independent religion based on the revelation (Kashf) of al-Hakim as divine.

While it is clear that Hamza ibn Ali was the Caliph's chief dāʿī, there are claims that al-Hakim believed in his own divinity. Other scholars disagree with this assertion of direct divinity, particularly the Druze themselves, noting that its proponent was ad-Darazi, who (according to some resources) al-Hakim executed for shirk. Letters show that ad-Darazi was trying to gain control of the Muwahhidun movement and this claim was an attempt to gain support from the Caliph, who instead found it heretical.

== In literature ==
The story of al-Hakim's life inspired (presumably through Antoine Isaac Silvestre de Sacy) the French author Gérard de Nerval (1808–1855) who recounted his version of it ("Histoire du Calife Hakem": History of the Caliph Hakem) as an appendix to his Voyage to the Orient (1851).

He is a major character in The Prisoner of Al-Hakim by American novelist Bradley Steffens, which recounts the ten-year imprisonment of Ibn al-Haytham under al-Hakim's rule.

A fictional version of al-Hakim is presented in Robert E. Howard's posthumously published short story "Hawks over Egypt".

The novel "The Sleeper in the Sands" by the English author and popular historian Tom Holland contains another fictional adaptation of the figure of al-Hakim.

=== Sobriquet in Western literature ===
In Western literature he has been referred to as the "Mad Caliph". This title is largely due to his erratic and oppressive behavior concerning religious minorities under his command, as historian Hunt Janin relates: al-Hakim "was known as the 'Mad Caliph' because of his many cruelties and eccentricities"; his persecution of Christians is seen as a contributing factor to the Crusades, as he not only forbade pilgrimage to the Holy Land but also ordered the demolition of the Church of the Holy Sepulchre in Jerusalem in 1009. The church was reconstructed by his son and successor al-Zahir, with historian Michael Bonner pointing out that the term is also used due to the dramatic difference between al-Hakim and his predecessors and successors and also points out that such persecution is an extreme rarity in Islam during this era. "In his capital of Cairo, this unbalanced (and, in the view of most, mad) caliph raged against the Christians in particular.... On the whole such episodes remained exceptional, like the episodes of forced conversion to Islam." Historian Michael Foss also notes this contrast: "For more than three hundred and fifty years, from the time when the Caliph Omar made a treaty with the Patriarch Sophronius until 1009, when mad al-Hakim began attacks on Christians and Jews, the city of Jerusalem and the Holy Land were open to the West, with an easy welcome and the way there was no more dangerous than a journey from Paris to Rome.... Soon [after al-Hakim] the panic was over. In 1037 al-Mustansir came to an amicable agreement with Emperor Michael IV."

As one prominent journal has noted, al-Hakim has attracted the interest of modern historians more than any other member of the Fatimid dynasty because:

"His eccentric character, the inconsistencies and radical shifts in his conduct and policies, the extreme austerity of his personal life, the vindictive and sanguinary ruthlessness of his dealing with the highest officials of his government coupled with an obsession to suppress all signs of corruption and immorality in public life, his attempted annihilation of Christians and call for the systematic destruction of all Christian holy places in the middle east culminating in the destruction of the most holy Church of the Resurrection in Jerusalem, his deification by a group of extremist Isma'ili missionaries who became the forerunners and founders of the Druze religion, [which] all combine to contrast his reign sharply with that of any of his predecessors and successors and indeed of any Muslim ruler.... The question is to what extent his conduct can be explained as rationally motivated and conditioned by the circumstances rather than as the inscrutable workings of an insane mind."

The claim that al-Hakim was mad and the version of events around him is disputed as mere propaganda by some scholars, such as Willi Frischaue, who states: "His enemies called him the 'Mad Caliph' but he enhanced Cairo's reputation as a centre of civilization." The writing of historian Heinz Halm attempts to dispel "those distorted and hostile accounts, stating that the anti-Fatimid tradition tried to make a real monster of this caliph", while P.J. Vatikiotis writes that, "[al-Hakim's] persecution of Christians and Jews and the legislation enacted for that purpose between 1004 and 1020 seem to have been a policy with a justifiable purpose."

== See also ==
- Family tree of Muhammad
- List of Egyptians
- List of Ismaili imams
- List of people who disappeared mysteriously (pre-1910)
- Lists of rulers of Egypt
- Al-Hakim Mosque

== Sources ==
- Bianquis, Thierry (1986). Damas et la Syrie sous la domination fatimide (359–468/969–1076): essai d'interprétation de chroniques arabes médiévales. Tome premier (in French). Damascus: Institut français de Damas. ISBN 978-2-35159130-7.
- Brett, Michael (2001). The Rise of the Fatimids: The World of the Mediterranean and the Middle East in the Fourth Century of the Hijra, Tenth Century CE. The Medieval Mediterranean. Vol. 30. Leiden: Brill. ISBN 9004117415.
- Daftary, Farhad (1990). The Ismāʿı̄lı̄s: Their History and Doctrines (First ed.). Cambridge: Cambridge University Press. ISBN 978-0-521-37019-6.
- Halm, Heinz (2003). Die Kalifen von Kairo: Die Fatimiden in Ägypten, 973–1074 [The Caliphs of Cairo: The Fatimids in Egypt, 973–1074] (in German). Munich: C. H. Beck. ISBN 3-406-48654-1.
- Kennedy, Hugh (2004) [1986]. The Prophet and the Age of the Caliphates: The Islamic Near East from the 6th to the 11th Century (Second ed.). Harlow: Longman. ISBN 978-0-582-40525-7.
- Lev, Yaacov (1987). "Army, Regime, and Society in Fatimid Egypt, 358–487/968–1094". International Journal of Middle East Studies. 19 (3): 337–365. doi:10.1017/S0020743800056762. JSTOR 163658. S2CID 162310414.
- Vatikiotis, Panayiotis J. (1957). The Fatimid Theory of State. Lahore: Orientalia Publishers – via books.google.com.
- Walker, Paul E. (2009). Caliph of Cairo: Al-Hakim bi-Amr Allah, 996 - 1021. Cairo: American Univ. in Cairo Press. ISBN 978-9774163289.

al-Hakim bi-Amr Allah Fatimid dynasty Born: 13 August 985 Died: 12 February 1021
Regnal titles
Preceded by al-Aziz Billah	Fatimid Caliph; 14 October 996 – 12 February 1021	Succeeded by al-Zahir li-I'zaz Din Allah
Shia Islam titles
Preceded by al-Aziz Billah	Imam of Isma'ilism; 14 October 996 – 12 February 1021	Succeeded by al-Zahir li-I'zaz Din Allah
