= Corfiot Maltese =

Ethnic minority in Greece

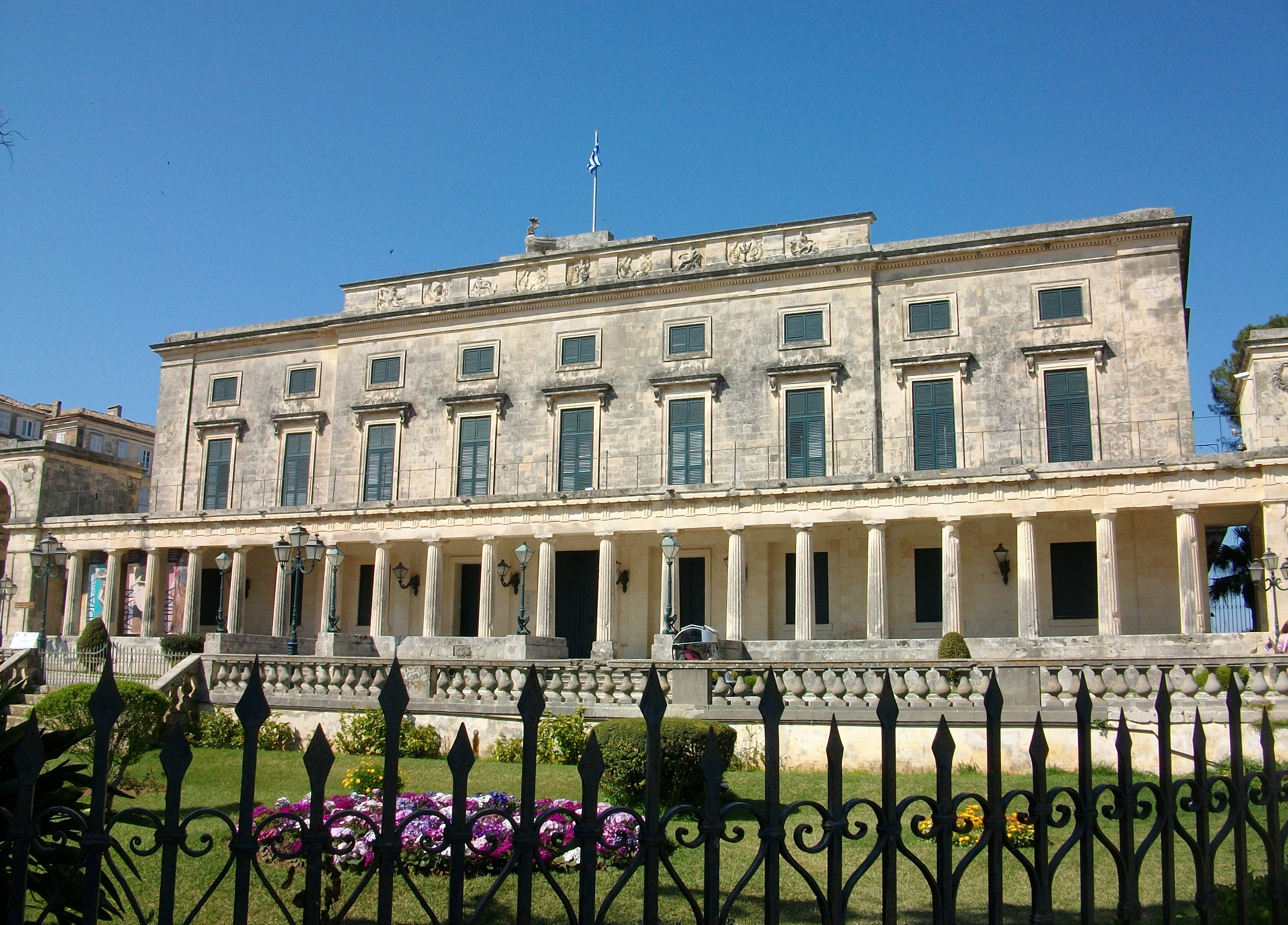
The Palace of St. Michael and St. George, built in Maltese limestone in Corfu town in 1819-1824. The sculptural elements of the palace are the work of the Maltese sculptors Vincenzo and Ferdinando Dimech, as well as the Corfiot sculptor Pavlos Prosalentis.

The Corfiot Maltese are a population from the Greek island of Corfu (Kerkyra) with ethnic and religious ties to the islands of Malta. A large community of descendants of Maltese is still present in Corfu. In the case of the Maltese Corfiot, who lost knowledge of the Maltese language in favour of Greek in the first half of the 20th century, religious confession remained the strongest identity marker. Maltese Corfiots today make up 2/3 of the local Catholic community.

== History ==
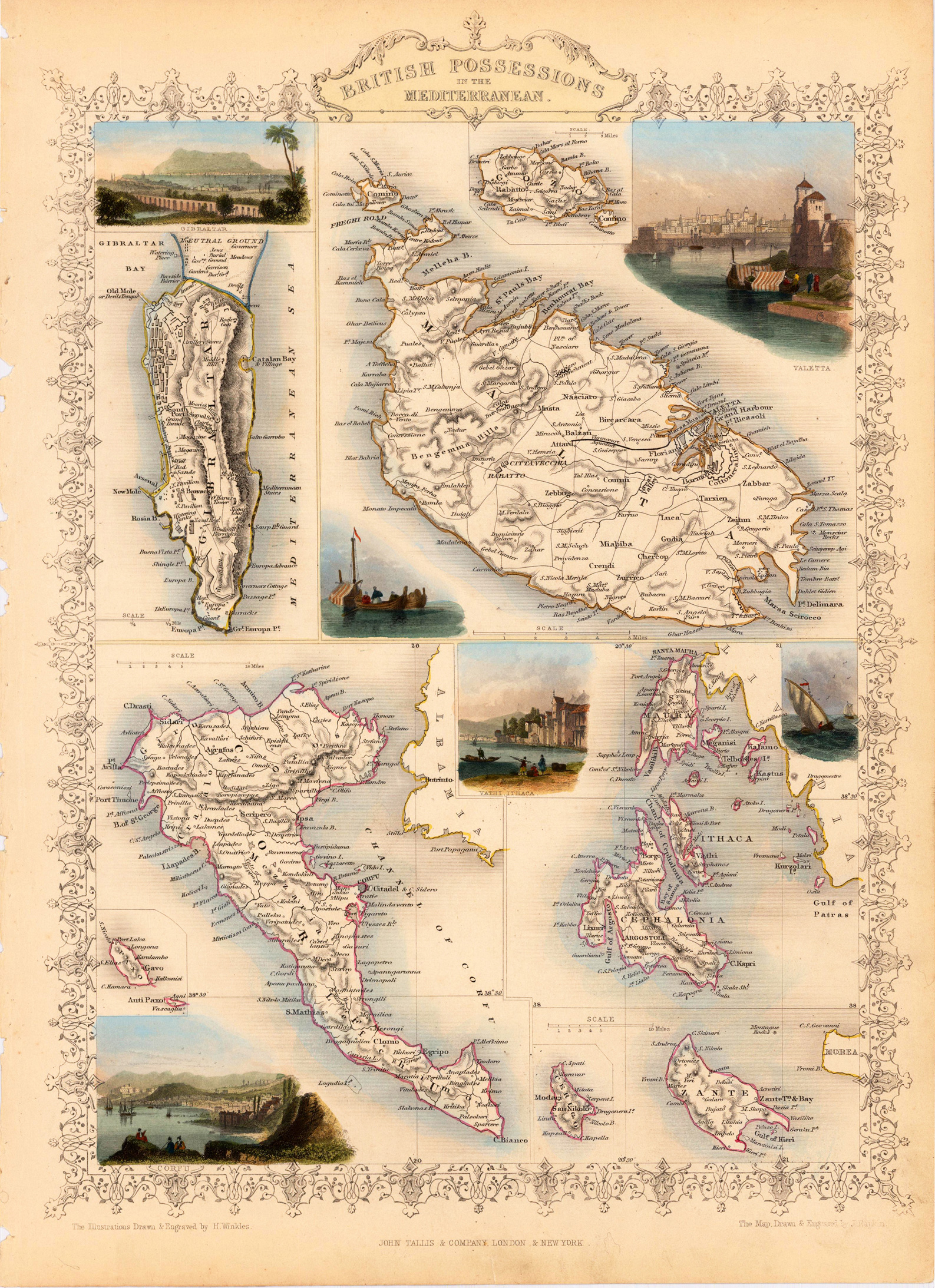
1851 John Tallis's map of British Possessions in the Mediterranean, including Corfu and Malta

=== 19th century ===
With the institution of the United States of the Ionian Islands in 1815, the British authorities encouraged immigration from Malta, as well as from Sicily and southern Italy, to the newly-acquired Greek islands. These were mainly "financial immigrants, political exiles, specialised craftmen and artists in the service of the British forces, as well as experienced farmers". The organised migration, which was aimed at "redeveloping society" in Corfu and Kefalonia, was particularly supported by the Great Lord Commissioner (and Governor of Malta) Thomas Maitland (1816-1823). The British invited married stonemasons so that their work would be continued by their children, and as a consequence 80 people (40 families from 1815 until 1860) were transported to Corfu.

When building the Palace of St. Michael and St. George in Corfu town in 1819-1824, despite local prejudice, the British colonial administration called on Maltese builders, including the sculptors Vincenzo and Ferdinando Dimech, to work along architect Sir George Whitmore as specialised crafters of the Maltese limestone. The Maltese craftsmen also supervised the construction of public buildings, cisterns and fortifications in Corfu town. The Maitland Monument (Rotunda) was also built in Maltese limestone in 1821.

In September 1826, around 278 farmers from Gozo landed at Argostoli in Kefalonia, following a request of the island's governor Charles James Napier to Malta's governor Lord Hastings, who had agreed to it following assurances that the migration project would be self-funded and not a burden on the treasury. Migrant Maltese, who could not afford any travel or settlement expenses, were supported by private benefactors such as the Marquis Vincenzo Bugeja and the Greek Maltese merchant Giovanni di Nicolò Pappaffy. Yet, once in Kefalonia, Maltese migrants faced social isolation and economic deprivation. In February 1829, Corfu's Commissioner Frederic Adam wrote to Napier asking why the Maltese immigrants had decreased in number, lived in poverty, and complained about hostility from Kefalonians. The latter, in turn, wrote to Adam that, while they had been promised competent farmers, with few exceptions they found "lazy, ignorant, uneducated, dirty, sick and maladjusted people who seemed like a flock of sheep, abandoned by a foreign country into their own community". Given the situation, two years later in 1831 all Maltese were moved from Kefalonia to Corfu to strengthen the local community.

Despite being Roman Catholic, in the 19th century the Maltese could not count upon the assistance of the Archdiocese of Corfu, which was mainly concerned with the more affluent Italian community living in Corfu town. Only few visiting priests from Malta came from time to time to Corfu to administer sacrament, particularly during Lent. Also to cope with this situation, the Corfiot Maltese gathered in the Britannia self-help association ("Associazione di mutuo soccorso fra i sudditi inglesi residenti a Corfu denominata BRITANNIA").

The Maltese remained the most socially disadvantaged group in Corfu. They lived in the outskirts of town, in two rural communities called Maltezika (from Malta) and Cozzella (from Gozo), where they were the first to cultivate sweet potatoes and pear trees, and to rear rabbits. Yet, while they were paid up to a third of a farmer's wage (when not paid in-kind with basic staples), they were accused of stealing jobs from the Corfiots. It took decades for the Maltese to achieve social inclusion in Corfiot society. At the 1888 international exposition in Athens, several Maltese Corfiot cultivators won awards for their production. Angelo Farrugia and Dionisio Laferla pioneered photography in Corfu, and Farrugia was also acknowledged as bookbinder to the Greek royal court. Social progress was the main aim of Spiro Gauci, who in 1887 co-founded with Thomas Powers and directed the Workers' Fraternity. Other distinguished Maltese Corfiots of the late 19th century included:

- the brothers Lorenzo, Peter and Francis Camilleri, actors and composers;
- Francis Caruana, composer and conductor;
- Alexander Grech and Alexander Buttigieg, musicians and composers;
- Peter Caruana and Francis Schembri, conductors;
- the famous trumpet player Bonello;
- Emilio Camilleri, later a member of the parliament of Malta;
- Toni Spiteri, art critic and writer

Corfiot Maltese were particularly devout to St Spiridion, whose cult was already popular in Malta, taking part in the Saint's processions with the traditional torches. In 1862, Schembri printed in Corfu a leaflet with the hymn to the patron saint of the island, St Spiridion: Cronicla in onore del glorioso taumaturgo Santo Spiridione Vecovo di Trimitunte e protettore di Corcira scritta dal Dr. Sacerdote Francesco Saverio Schembri, Maltese (Corcira tip. Jonia di Spiridione ed. Arsenio fratelli Cao, 1862, p.8).

While the first merchant with a Maltese name is recorded in Corfu already in 1802, in 1824 there were 25 men and women working for the British administration; the same year Lorenzo Tabone was the first Maltese to appeal to the Senate and obtain the title of Citizen of the Ionian State. Only in 1828, the number of Maltese in the archipelago has grown to 508, and to 804 in 1832. Maltese emigration to these islands practically ceased when they were returned to Greece in 1864. By the end of the century, in 1891, there were 1,673 Maltese in Greece, of which 928 in Corfu.

After the union of Corfu with Greece in 1864, several Corfiot Maltese families, especially the Atzopardis (Azzopardi), moved to Cardiff, Wales; some of them returned to Corfu in the 1920s, and remain known as the Cardiff Corfiots. In the late 19 century, some Corfiot Maltese resettled in Smyrna in Asia Minor, joining the local Maltese community while retaining their British passports. They left after the 1922 fire.

=== 20th century ===
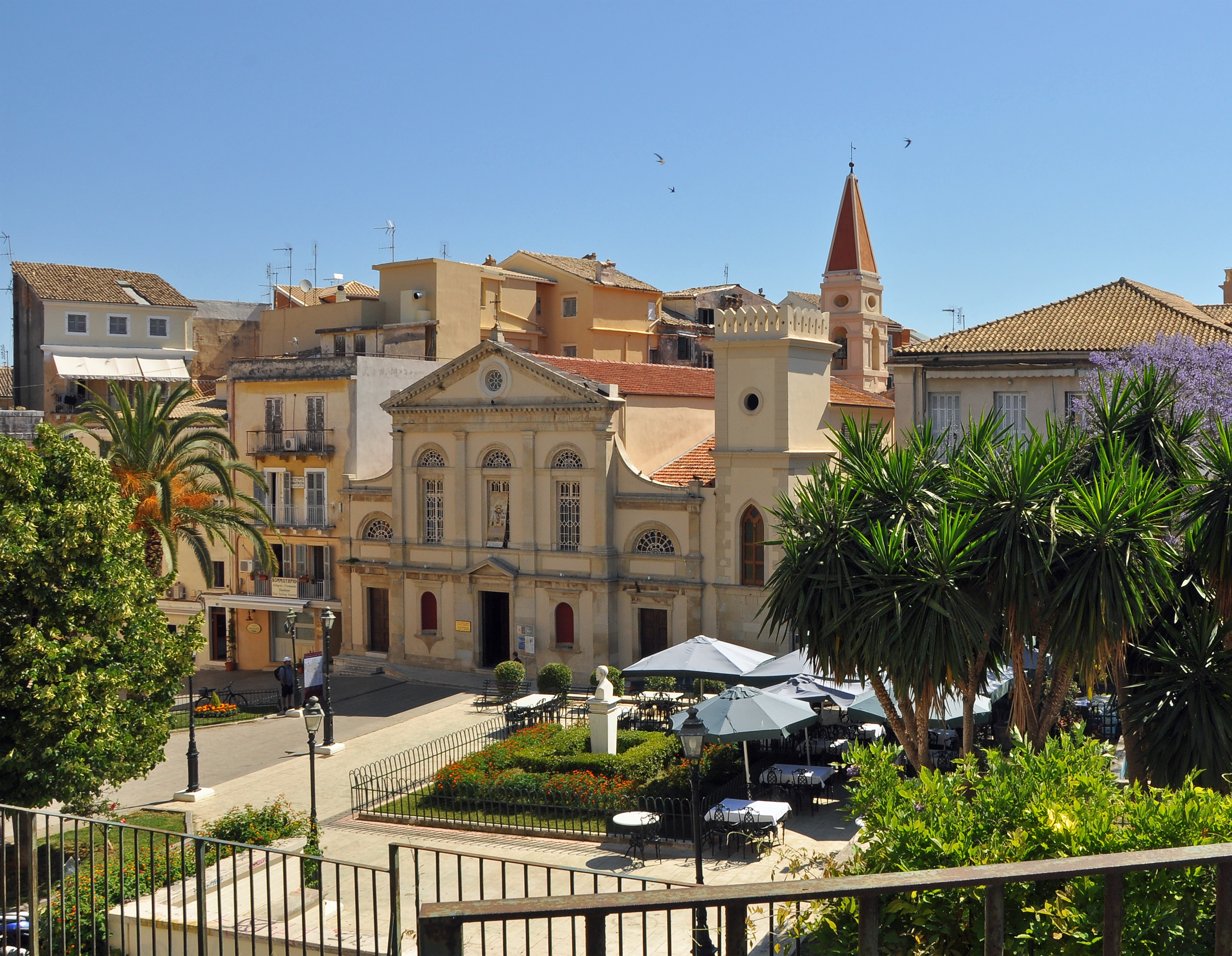
Corfu's Cathedral of Saint James and Saint Christopher

In 1901, there were almost one thousand people in Corfu who considered themselves to be ethnic Maltese. In Cephalonia, the number was 225. There were another hundred Maltese spread among the other lesser islands of the Ionian Group.

In Cozzella, the Franciscan Sisters of Malta (headed by the Gozitan Mother Margherita De Brincat) opened a convent and a school in 1907, which operated till 1961. The Franciscan school was pivotal in fostering the language shift among the Corfiot Maltese, and their social assimilation in the Greek-speaking society of Corfu. the Society of Greek Catholics of Corfu, founded in the early 1920s, represented one more step of integration of the Catholic community in the Greek society.

The first resident spiritual guide for the Maltese Corfiot was Father Domenico Darmanin (1843-1919), a Corfiot Maltese himself, who had previously served at the Archdiocese of Syros, and who served as Bishop of Corfu from 1912 till his death.

In 1923, there were some 1,200 ethnic Maltese in Corfu, but many of them spoke either Greek or the local Corfiot dialect, which still bore traces of the Venetian occupation of the island. Because of this Venetian connection, Fascist propagandists tried to build up an irredentist case for Corfu. Guido Puccio wrote in Tribuna, a leading Roman newspaper on 12 September 1923, that the Maltese element in Corfu could be used as an instrument to further Italian claims on that island. The Italian navy bombarded and briefly occupied Corfu in the Corfu incident of August-September 1923.

In 1926, all Corfu-born Maltese who had not become British citizens were asked to register with the municipality and acquire Greek citizenship, or they would be expelled from the islands. In 1930, the Maltese in Corfu had their own priest who looked after their welfare while he kept useful contacts with the ecclesiastical and civil authorities in Malta. That priest was the Rev. Spiridione Cilia, who had been born in Corfu of Maltese parents and became the parish priest of the Maltese community.

In 1940, when the Italian Army occupied Corfu once again, the 2,500 well-integrated Maltese Corfiots could not be prey of fascist propaganda. Corfu was then occupied by the Nazi German army in 1943; following heavy Allied bombardment, in April 1944 the Nazi occupiers decided to intern all British citizens present in Greece, including the Corfiot Maltese. Yet, following consultation with the former British Consul, the Nazis realised that the consistent Maltese Corfiot community (562 British citizens) was mainly composed of merchants and farmers, had little command of English language and had mainly obtained British citizenship by inheritance. In May 1944, the Nazi command in Ioannina advised the Corfu commander to deport the Corfiot Maltese to labor camps in Germany. This decision was never carried due to the course of the war. The Nazis did exterminate up to 2,000 Corfiot Jews, deported to Auschwitz, before retreating to the mainland by October 1944. During the war the main church of the Maltese Catholic community in Corfu town, the Cathedral of Saint James and Saint Christopher, was burned down together with its archives. It was later rebuilt in simple Latin style.

After the war, a number of Maltese families abandoned Corfu and settled in Cardiff, Wales, to work in the industrial zone there. They founded the Saint Spiridion" Association of Corfiot and All-Greek Roman Catholics, retaining strong links with Corfu and the Franciscan Sisters. There are around 500 Catholic Corfiots in the Cardiff area today.

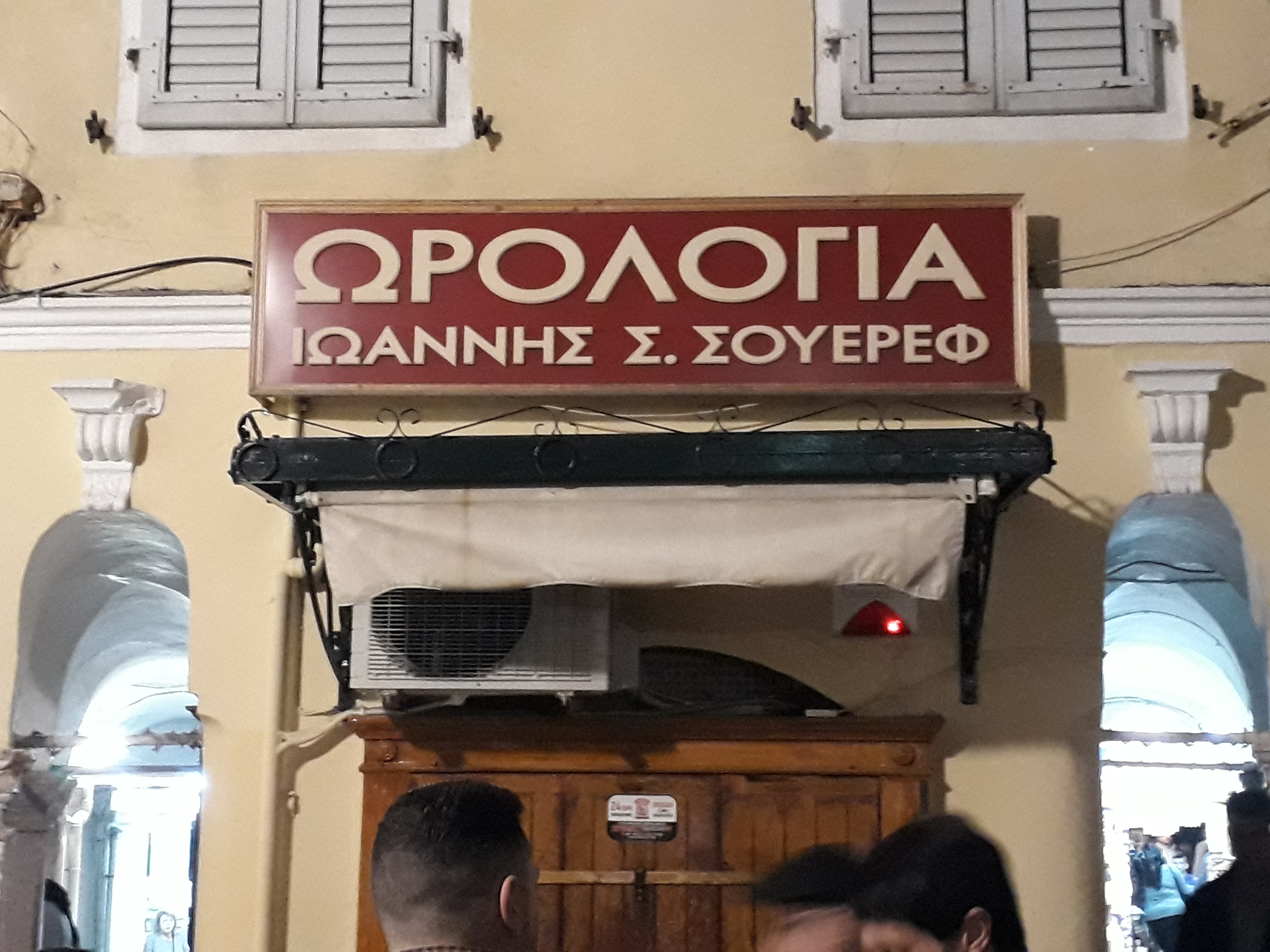
A shop in the Old Town belonging to a Mr Ioannis Soueref (Xuereb)

=== 21st century ===
The Corfiot Maltese community currently numbers 3,500 people in the entire island. They constitute the center of the Catholic community of Corfu, but not one among them continues to speaks the Maltese language. Typical Maltese Corfiot surnames include Psailas (Psaila), Spiteris (Spiteri), Atzopardis (Azzopardi), Soueref (Xuereb), Sakkos (Sacco) and Michalef (Micallef).

The former mayor of the city of Corfu, Sotiris Micalef, is of Maltese descent. Maltese Corfiot Yannis Spiteris, O.F.M. Cap., was the Roman Catholic archbishop of Corfu, Zakynthos and Cephalonia from 2003 till 2020.

Since 2011, the Maltese Corfiot Spiros Gaoutsis (Gauci) is honorary consul of Malta in Corfu. In 2012, an exhibition was held at the Palace entitled "Maltese in Corfu".

== See also ==
- Corfiot Italians

== Bibliography ==
- Price, Charles. Malta and the Maltese: a study in nineteenth century migration. Georgia House. Melbourne, 1954.
- Spiros Gautsis (Gauci), The Chronicle of the Maltese Sisters in Corfu, Corfu, 2007.
- Photini Karlafti-Moutratidi, Aspects de la vie economique a’ Corfou au milieu du 17eme siècle, Athenes, 2005.
- Amalia Plaskasoviti, Language and identity in migrant context: Attitudes of the members of the Maltese community of Corfu towards their ethnic language and heritage
