= Ottavio Bandini =

17th-century Roman Catholic cardinal

His Eminence Ottavio Bandini
- Cardinal-Bishop of Ostia e Velletri
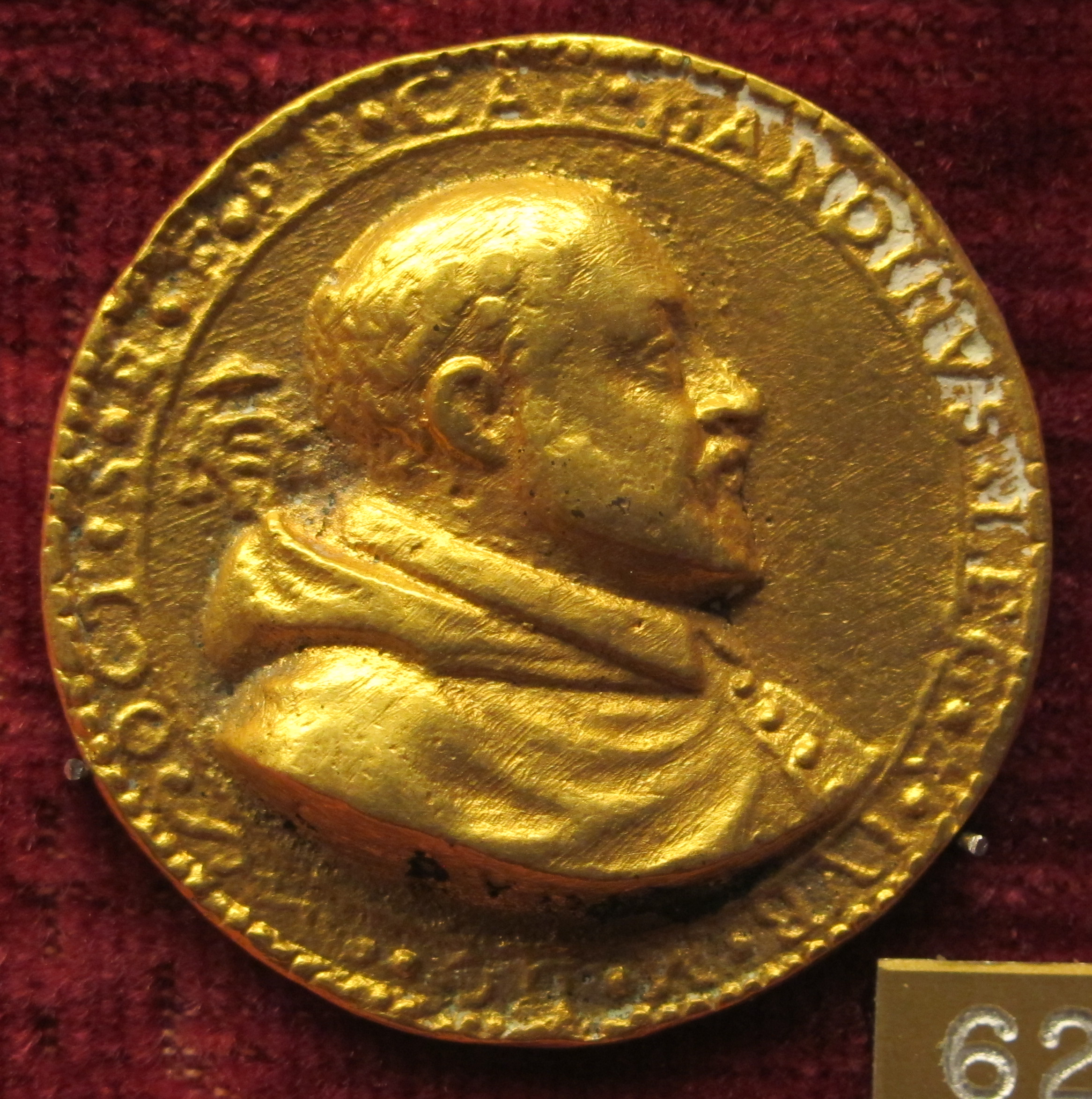
- Church: Catholic Church

Orders
- Consecration: 25 June 1595 by Alessandro Ottaviano de' Medici

Personal details
- Born: 25 October 1558 Florence, Italy
- Died: 1 August 1629 (aged 70) Rome, Italy
- Coat of arms

Ottavio Bandini (1558–1629) was a Roman Catholic cardinal.

== Biography ==
On 25 June 1595, he was consecrated bishop by Alessandro Ottaviano de' Medici, Archbishop of Florence, with Ludovico de Torres, Archbishop of Monreale, and Gian Francesco Biandrate di San Giorgio Aldobrandini, Bishop of Acqui, serving as co-consecrators.

He died on August 1, 1629, at the age of 70, and was buried in the Chapel of the Assumption in the Basilica of San Silvestro al Quirinale.

== Episcopal succession ==
Episcopal succession of Ottavio Bandini

While bishop, he was the principal consecrator of:

- Orazio Capponi, Bishop of Carpentras (1596);
- Bernardino Morra, Bishop of Aversa (1598);
- Gregorio Servanzi, Bishop of Trevico (1604);
- Angelo Rocca, Titular Bishop of Thagaste (1605);
- Ottavio Viale, Bishop of Saluzzo (1608);
- Cosimo della Gherardesca, Bishop of Colle di Val d'Elsa (1613);
- Antonius de Pozega, Bishop of Scardona (1613);
- Franciscus Boncianni, Archbishop of Pisa (1613);
- Carlo Bornio, Titular Bishop of Coronea and Coadjutor Bishop of Castro di Puglia (1614);
- Baccio Gherardini, Bishop of Fiesole (1615);
- Giovanni Collesius, Bishop of Albania (1615);
- Cosimo de' Bardi, Bishop of Carpentras (1616);
- Benedetto Bragadin, Archbishop of Corfù (1618);
- Filippo Salviati (bishop), Bishop of Sansepolcro (1619);
- Lorenzo Azzolini, Bishop of Ripatransone (1620);
- Ottavio Corsini, Titular Archbishop of Tarsus and Apostolic Nuncio to Florence (1621);
- Agostino Solaro di Moretta, Bishop of Fossano (1621);
- Pietro Dini, Archbishop of Fermo (1621);
- Benedikt Orsini, Bishop of Lezhë (1621);
- Pietro Budi, Bishop of Sapë (1621);
- Fabio Lagonissa, Archbishop of Conza (1622);
- Ascanio Castagna, Bishop of Isola (1622);
- Giulio del Pozzo, Bishop of Accia and Mariana (1622);
- Fulgenzio Gallucci, Titular Bishop of Thagaste (1623);
- Giovanni Battista Deti, Bishop of Albano (1623);
- Lorenzo Campeggi, Bishop of Cesena (1624);
- Francesco Nori, Bishop of San Miniato (1624);
- Pietro Massarecchius, Archbishop of Bar (1624);
- Paolo Torelli, Archbishop of Rossano (1624);
- Giacomo Theodoli, Archbishop of Amalfi (1625);
- Gerolamo Maria Zambeccari, Bishop of Alife (1625);
- Giovanni Battista Rinuccini, Archbishop of Fermo (1625);
- Ferdinando Bruno, Bishop of Lacedonia (1625);
- Carlo Emmanuele Pio di Savoia, Bishop of Albano (1627);

and the principal co-consecrator of:

- Pietro Aldobrandini, Archbishop of Ravenna (1604); and
- Ascanio Colonna, Cardinal-Bishop of Palestrina (1606).

Catholic Church titles
Preceded by Sigismondo Zanettini	Archbishop of Fermo; 1595–1606	Succeeded by Alessandro Strozzi
Preceded by Filippo Spinola	Cardinal-Priest of Santa Sabina; 1596–1615	Succeeded by Giulio Savelli
Preceded by Francesco Maria Bourbon Del Monte Santa Maria	Cardinal-Priest of San Lorenzo in Lucina; 1615–1621	Succeeded by Bartolomeo Cesi
Preceded by Francesco Maria Bourbon Del Monte Santa Maria	Cardinal-Bishop of Palestrina; 1621–1624	Succeeded by Andrea Baroni Peretti Montalto
Preceded by Antonio Maria Gallo	Prefect of the Congregation of Bishops and Regulars; 1622–1627	Succeeded by Gasparo Carpegna
Preceded by Francesco Sforza	Cardinal-Bishop of Porto e Santa Rufina; 1624–1626	Succeeded by Giovanni Battista Deti
Preceded by	Prefect of the Congregation of Ecclesiastical Immunity; 1626–1629	Succeeded by Vitaliano Borromeo (cardinal)
Preceded by Francesco Maria Bourbon Del Monte Santa Maria	Cardinal-Bishop of Ostia e Velletri; 1626–1629	Succeeded by Giovanni Battista Deti
