= Cleto Bellucci =

Italian prelate

- Archbishop of Archdiocese of Fermo (emeritus)
- Church: Roman Catholic Church
- See: Archdiocese of Fermo
- In office: 1976 - 1997
- Predecessor: Norberto Perini
- Successor: Benito Gennaro Franceschetti
- Previous post: Coadjutor archbishop of the Archdiocese of Fermo

Orders
- Ordination: 27 January 1946
- Consecration: 14 May 1969 by Carlo Confalonieri

Personal details
- Born: 23 April 1921 Ancona, Italy
- Died: 7 March 2013 (aged 91) Fermo, Italy

Cleto Bellucci (23 April 1921 – 7 March 2013) was an Italian Prelate of Roman Catholic Church.

== Biography ==
Cleto Bellucci was born in Ancona, Italy and ordained a priest on 27 January 1946. Bellucci was appointed auxiliary archbishop of the Diocese of Taranto on 15 March 1969, as well as titular bishop of Melzi and ordained bishop on 14 May 1969. Bellucci was appointed Coadjutor bishop to the Archdiocese of Fermo on 9 July 1973, and succeeded Norberto Perini after his retirement on 21 June 1976. Bellucci retired as archbishop of Fermo on 18 June 1997. He died on 7 March 2013 after being rushed to the hospital in Fermo that day from his home.
