= Fermo chasuble of St. Thomas Becket =

Garment belonging to Thomas Becket

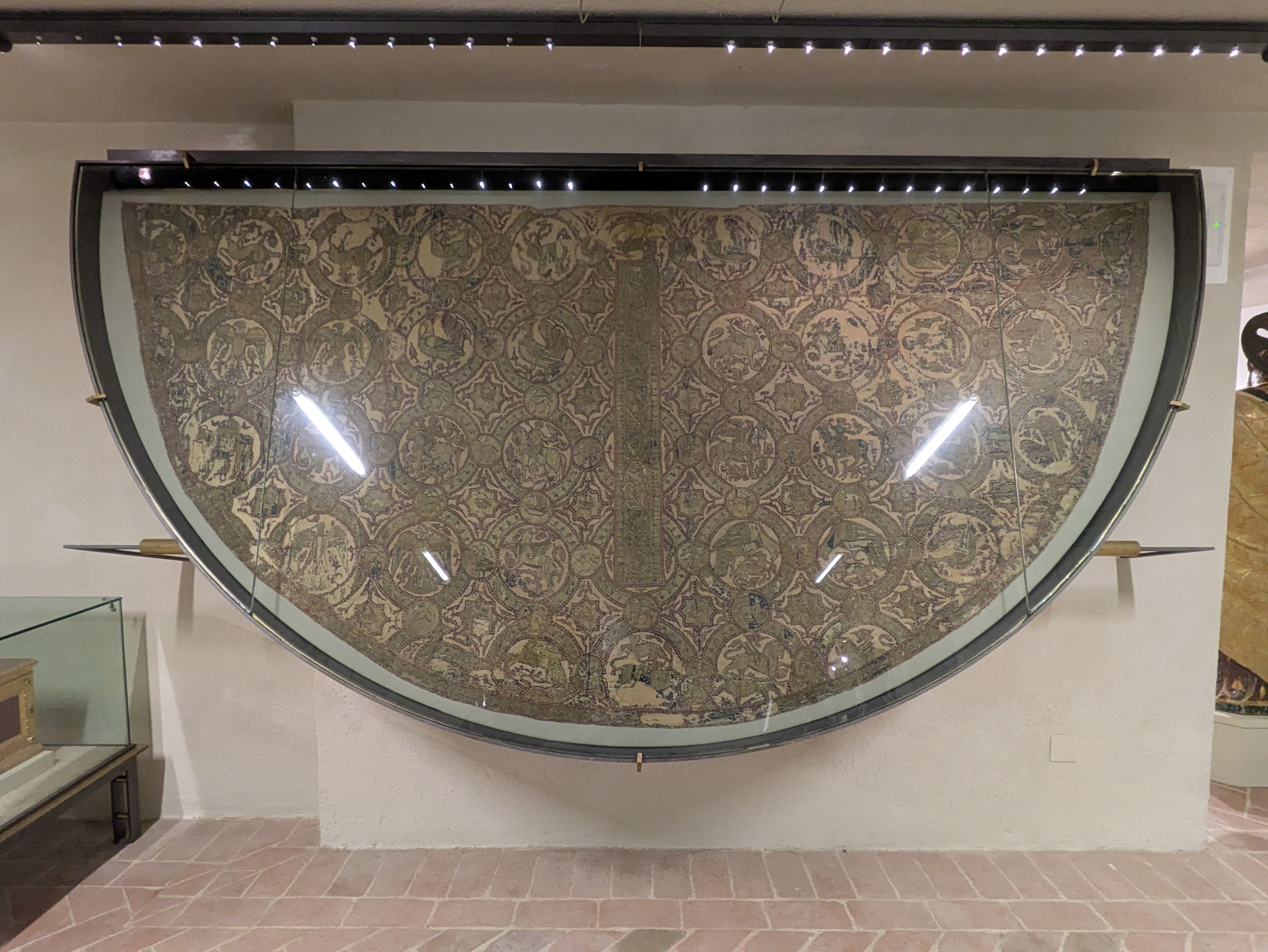
Fermo chasuble of St. Thomas Becket

The Fermo chasuble of St. Thomas Becket is a garment belonging to Thomas Becket, Archbishop of Canterbury from 1162 until his murder in 1170.

On display at the Museo Diocesano in Fermo, the chasuble is among the possessions of the treasury of the Fermo Cathedral (Duomo di Fermo). It was donated by Presbitero, bishop of Fermo (1184–1201), who, scholar David Storm Rice suggests, had received it from Thomas Becket himself, when they were both students at the Studium of Bologna. Other sources dispute this claim, and instead suggest that the chasuble was donated by the Cult of Saint Thomas as they passed through Fermo. The textile is one few surviving from the medieval period, and is believed to one of the oldest examples of Islamic embroidery used for a Christian purpose. This textile also serves as evidence to corroborate a coexistence between the Middle East and Europe during the medieval period. Most modern knowledge of the chasuble is credited to the efforts of Professor of Islamic Art and Architecture at the University of London, David Storm Rice and textile conservator, Sigrid Müller Christensen, through their collaborative research efforts in the 1950s.

== History ==
=== Background ===
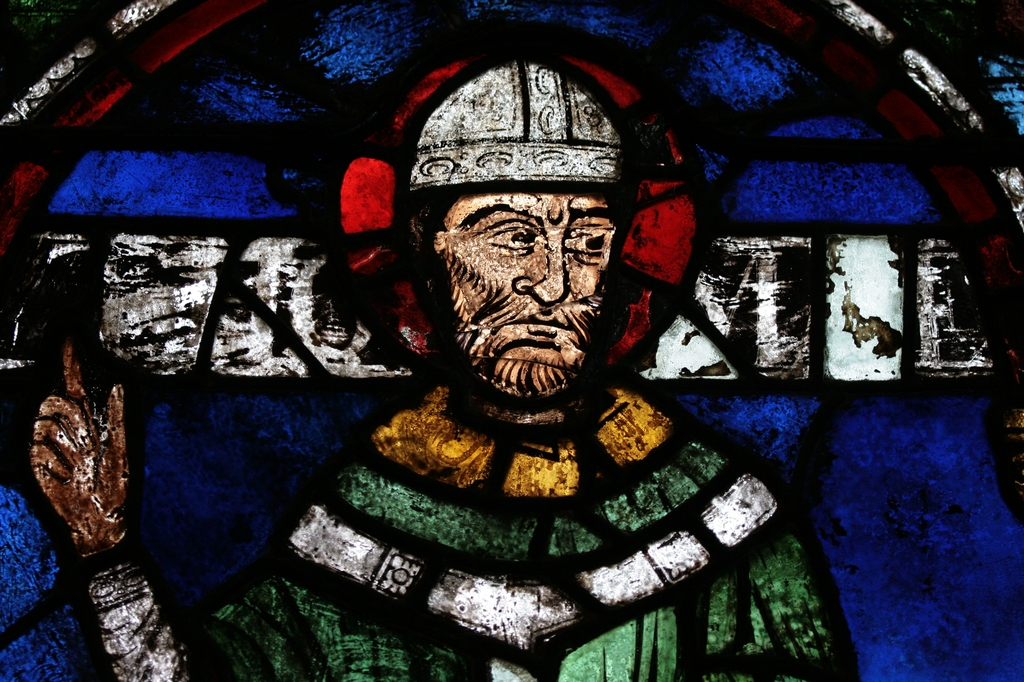
Stained glass window of Thomas Becket in Canterbury Cathedral

St. Thomas Becket was born in December 1118 to devout Catholic merchant parents in Cheapside, London. As an adult, he began his work as an accountant for three years. He was then introduced to Archbishop Theobald and joined his household. During his time there, he and the Archbishop became close, and he was sent to study civil and canon law in Italy and France. In 1154, he was appointed the Archdeacon of Canterbury and, three months later, King Henry II appointed him chancellor. As chancellor he grew close with the king and was known for living a lavish, expensive lifestyle. However, after being elected Archbishop of Canterbury a year after Theobald's death in 1161, he became very pious and began disagreeing with the king on many issues. Their relationship became quarrelsome to the point that King Henry II exiled him between November 1164 and December 1170. At the end of his exile, four knights, inspired by the words of King Henry, killed him on December 29, 1170. Three years later, he was canonized by Pope Alexander III.

=== After Becket's death ===
It is said that after his burial at Canterbury Cathedral, miracles began taking place at the site. According to John of Salisbury, a friend of St. Thomas and one of his biographers, paralytics, blind, deaf, and mute people, and lepers were cured and the dead were resurrected at St. Thomas’ burial site. These accounts inspired the Knights of Saint Thomas - whose followers would later become the Knights Hospitaller - to found a church and hospital dedicated to Thomas Becket. Large numbers of pilgrims began traveling to Canterbury to pray or be healed.

The chasuble is said to have been a relic, as it was supposedly the garment in which Becket was buried in 1170; however, other sources dispute whether the textile was even fashioned into the chasuble during Becket's lifetime. Simon-Cahn provides evidence that the chasuble may have been created after Becket's death to emulate the chasuble he was buried in, and this garment gained notoriety from the Cult of Saint Thomas Becket, which was increasing in size at that time. The exact provenance of the garment is unknown, but it appeared in Fermo, Italy as a reliquary under the rebuilding of the cathedral in Fermo under Bishop Presbitero.

== Description ==
Originally preserved inside a wooden box decorated in gold with gemstones, the semi-circular chasuble is 1.6 m high and has a circumference of 5.41 m. It is made of light-blue and white silk and decorated in gold and red thread embroidery. The embroidery consists of 34 large roundels interlinked with smaller roundels and eight-pointed stars. The large roundels on the outside of the garment show representations of peacocks, two winged lion griffins, four eagle griffins, frontal eagles with spread wings, confronted birds, confronted winged lions, some rapacious birds atop gazelles, a winged sphinx, and fragments of other animals. There are also representations of elephants with howdahs, one with women inside; four groups of turbaned hunters holding falcons seated on horses with rabbits below, and two enthroned men flanked by musicians and other attendants, all of which portray scenes of the Princely Cycle, a common theme in Islamic art. An oblong panel with a lavish scroll contains this Kufic inscription: "In the name of Allah the Merciful, the Compassionate, the kingdom is Allah's...greatest blessing, perfect health and happiness to its owner...in the year 510 in Mariyya".

The chasuble is constructed from a textile which has been concluded once served a different purpose. Thirty-eight different panels fashion the chasuble, and are arranged in a patchwork manner to construct the bell-shaped garment. The chasuble is made up of different parts sewn together with red silk; some portions were sewn before the embroidery process, others afterwards, making the embroidery itself discontinuous. There is also no clear border to the textile. Potential original uses for the textile have been suggested as a canopy or tent cloth.

== Arabic inscriptions ==
Due to age, deterioration, and differences of interpretation, the exact translation of the Arabic on this textile is unknown. A majority of the supposed Arabic script on the chasuble is indecipherable, due to the style of calligraphy and the degradation of the silk and embroidery. Historians and translators that have worked on the chasuble do agree on the religious undertones of the written Arabic, specifically the recurrence of the written word الله, Allah. There is also evidence to suggest the presence of pseudo-Arabic script, common at the time in art objects attempting to appear worldly. The Arabic script is written in a floriated Kufic calligraphy style, common to the Fatimid era. However, historian Isabella Dolezeal accredits the creation of the original textile to a workshop in Islamic Spain, and historian David Jacoby credits at least one panel of the textile to Almeria, Spain specifically. This in part with the animal imagery commonly found during the Fatimid and Norman periods, eastern Mediterranean, and Central Asia, and the object eventual presence in Fermo, supports the evidence of a globally connected Middle Ages.

Shalem's book on the chasuble includes a chapter on the Arabic Inscription, with a translation by Mohamed Adb el-Rahim. His version includes the Bismillah prayer from the Quran, but the remainder of his translation is contested due to anachronistic and a-geographical language factors. Dolezeal also suggests that due to the specific style of the Arabic calligraphy, it is unclear if the writing on the fabric registered to the Christians that issued the chasuble as Arabic script.

== Studies ==
The chasuble is a major example of the process of the Christianisation of an Islamic textile; this Arabic inscription on the chasuble allows scholars to ascribe the textile to a laboratory working during the Islamic period in Spain. The Christianisation process is proven both by the fact that the textile became a garment used in Christian liturgy and by its association with the worship of Thomas Becket as a saint and martyr, which spread all over Europe during the 13th century.

Early modern research done on the chasuble is somewhat limited, and looks primarily at the garment for its basic elements- cloth, silk, embroidery. Professor David Storm Rice, from University of London, studied the chasuble extensively and was the first to detect and decipher the inscription on the textile. Working together from 1958 to 1960 with textile historian Sigrid Müller-Christensen, they compiled what is known today as the Fermo File, which is now stored in the archives of the Bavarian National Museum. This report includes physical and historical research on the chasuble. Müller-Christensen was responsible for creating the first modern rendering of the Chasuble in 1973, and her diagrams are still the primary resource when analyzing the chasuble.

Furthermore, due to its importance and exceptional state of preservation, the chasuble has undergone thorough analysis by the art historian Avinoam Shalem with the publication of his book, The Chasuble of Thomas Becket: A Biography, in 2017, who studied the textile and its history in collaboration with the Bruschettini Foundation, Germano Liberati, Birgitt Borkopp-Restle, Regula Schorta, Miriam Ali-de-Unzaga, Ariane Dor, David Jacoby, Ursula Nilgen, and Marta Jaro.

== Bibliography ==
- Butts, E. L.; Cutts, E. L. (1875). "The History of the Eucharistic Vestments". The Art Journal. 1: 50–53. doi:10.2307/20568632. JSTOR 20568632.
- Dolezalek, Isabelle, Arabic Script on Christian Kings: Textile Inscriptions on Royal Garments, De Gruyter, Berlin/Boston, 2017
- Jacoby, David (2004). "Silk Economics and Cross-Cultural Artistic Interaction: Byzantium, the Muslim World, and the Christian West". Dumbarton Oaks Papers. 58: 197–240. doi:10.2307/3591386. JSTOR 3591386..
- Knowles, Michael David. "St. Thomas Becket." Encyclopædia Britannica, Encyclopædia Britannica, Inc., 7 June 2019, www.britannica.com/biography/Saint-Thomas-Becket.
- Neci̇Poğlu, Gülru (2015). "The Scrutinizing Gaze in the Aesthetics of Islamic Visual Cultures: Sight, Insight, and Desire". Muqarnas Online. 32: 23–61. doi:10.1163/22118993-00321p04..
- Payne, Alina, Dalmatia and the Mediterranean: Portable Archaeology and the Poetics of Influence, Brill, Leiden, 2014
- Shalem, Avinoam, The Chasuble of Thomas Becket, a biography, Hirmer Publishers, 2016
- Simon-Cahn, Annabelle, The Fermo Chasuble of St. Thomas Becket and Hispano.Mauresque Cosmological Silks: some speculations on the adaptive reuse of textiles, Muqarnas, Vol. 10, Essays in Honor of Oleg Grabar (1993), pp. 1–5
- Slocum, Kay Brainerd (2018). The Cult of Thomas Becket. doi:10.4324/9781315102870. ISBN 9781315102870. S2CID 192075170.
