= Arsenius of Corfu =

Greek saint

Saint Arsenios of Kerkyra
- Icon of SS. Spyridon and Arsenios from a chapel in Kerkyra

Archbishop of Corfu
- Died: c. 959
- Resting place: Cathedral of Saint James and Saint Christopher
- Honored in: Eastern Orthodox Church, Roman Catholic Church
- Canonized: Pre-Congregation
- Feast: 19 January

Arsenius (Arsenios) of Corfu, also known as Arsenius of Kerkyra, (died c.959) is one of the principal patron saints of Corfu along with Spyridon.

== Life ==
Orthodox tradition states that Arsenius was born in Bethany near Jerusalem. He entered religious life as a monk at the age of twelve and completed his studies in Seleucia. After being ordained a priest, he went to Constantinople, where the Patriarch Tryphon entrusted him with some positions in the diocese. He led a strict ascetic life, and was a highly educated man and renowned spiritual writer. However certain Catholic sources say that he was a native of Constantinople and a convert from Judaism.

In 933 Tryphon's successor, Theophylat, appointed Arsenius bishop of Corfu. That same year, the city, led by Arsenius, withstood a Saracen attack. Diocese of Kerkyra received the status of an Archdiocese, and Arsenius became its first Archbishop.

He was very assiduous in prayer and in ancient times in Corfu there was a cave where, according to tradition, Arsenio used to retire and spend the nights praying. He put the sacrament of the blessing of oil together in its present form. Returning from a journey to Constantinople, he fell seriously ill and died at Corinth in the year 959. His body was transported to Corfu and buried in the church of SS. Peter and Paul. The saints remains are now preserved at the Cathedral of Saint James and Saint Christopher.

There is a small Byzantine church dedicated to St. Arsenius at Gimari. The feast day of Arsenius is January 19.
