= Filippo de Angelis =

Italian cardinal (1792–1877)

His Eminence Filippo de Angelis
- Archbishop of Fermo
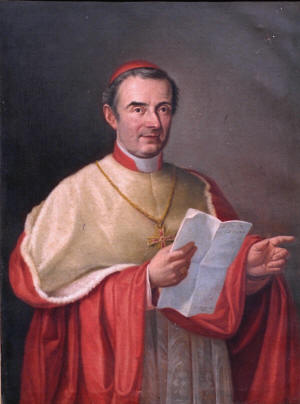
- Portrait.
- Church: Roman Catholic Church
- Archdiocese: Fermo
- See: Fermo
- Appointed: 27 January 1842
- Term ended: 8 July 1877
- Predecessor: Gabriele Ferretti
- Successor: Amilcare Malagola
- Other posts: Cardinal-Priest of San Lorenzo in Lucina (1867–77); Camerlengo of the Apostolic Camera (1867–77); Protopriest (1867–77)
- Previous posts: Titular Bishop of Leuca (1826–30); Titular Archbishop of Carthage (1830–38); Apostolic Nuncio to Portugal (1832–38); Archbishop-Bishop of Montefiascone (1838–42); Archbishop-Bishop of Corneto (1838–42); Cardinal-Priest of San Bernardo alle Terme (1839–67)

Orders
- Consecration: 23 July 1826 by Pietro Francesco Galleffi
- Created cardinal: 13 September 1838 (in pectore); 8 July 1839 (revealed) by Pope Gregory XVI
- Rank: Cardinal-Priest (1839–77)

Personal details
- Born: Filippo de Angelis; 16 April 1792 Ascoli Piceno, Papal States
- Died: 8 July 1877 (aged 85) Fermo, Kingdom of Italy
- Buried: Fermo Cathedral
- Parents: Vincenzo de Angelis; Maria Alvitreti
- Education: Pontifical Academy of Ecclesiastical Nobles; La Sapienza University

Filippo de Angelis (16 April 1792 – 8 July 1877) was an Italian cardinal of the Roman Catholic Church who served as both archbishop of Fermo from 1842 and camerlengo from 1867 until his death. Angelis was elevated to the cardinalate in 1839.

== Life ==
Filippio de Angelis was born in Ascoli Piceno to a patrician family. He studied at the seminary in Ascoli Piceno before entering the Pontifical Academy of Ecclesiastical Nobles in Rome in 1816. He then attended Sapienza University of Rome, from where he obtained his doctorates in canon and civil law (22 July 1818), philosophy, and theology (25 September 1819).

After his ordination to the priesthood, Angelis was raised to the rank of Domestic Prelate and served as a professor at his alma mater of the Pontifical Academy of Ecclesiastical Nobles for many years. He was made a canon of the Liberian Basilica as well.

On 6 July 1826, Angelis was appointed Coadjutor Bishop of Montefiascone and Titular Bishop of Leuce by Pope Leo XII. Then he was Apostolic Visitor in Forlì.

He was consecrated as a bishop on 23 July 1827 by Cardinal Pietro Francesco Galleffi, with Archbishops Giuseppe della Porta Rodiani and Giovanni Sinibaldi serving as co-consecrators, in the church of Ss. Trinita a Montecitorio. In 1830 he was promoted to Titular Archbishop of Cartagine on 15 March and later named Nuncio to Switzerland on 23 April. He was named Nuncio to Portugal on 13 November 1832, but remained in Switzerland until April 1839 and never occupied the post in Portugal because Portuguese diplomatic relations with the Holy See were terminated shortly after his appointment.

Angelis was appointed Bishop of Montefiascone, with the personal title of "Archbishop", on 15 February 1838. Pope Gregory XVI secretly (in pectore) elevated him to the College of Cardinals in the consistory of the following 13 September, eventually publishing him as Cardinal Priest of S. Bernardo alle Terme. He was made Archbishop of Fermo on 27 January 1842 and later participated in the papal conclave of 1846, which selected Pope Pius IX.

On 20 September 1867, Angelis was named Chamberlain of the Holy Roman Church, or Camerlengo. He opted for the titular church of San Lorenzo in Lucina on that same date. Becoming Cardinal Protopriest (the longest-serving member of the order of Cardinal Priests) on the following 4 December, Angelis attended the First Vatican Council (1868-1870), of which he was made chief presiding officer on 30 December 1869.

He died in Fermo at the age of 85. At the time of his death, he was the oldest living cardinal. He is buried in Fermo.

== Bibliography ==
- Leti, Giuseppe (1902). Fermo e il cardinale Filippo de Angelis: (pagine de storia politica) (in Italian). Roma: Società editrice Dante Alighieri.

Catholic Church titles
Preceded by Pietro Ostini	Nuncio to Switzerland; 1830 – 1832	Succeeded by Tommaso Pasquale Gizzi
Preceded by Alessandro Giustiniani	Nuncio to Portugal; 1832 – 1838	Succeeded by Camillo di Pietro
Preceded by Gabriele Ferretti	Bishop of Montefiascone; 1838-1842	Succeeded by Nicola Mattei Baldini
Preceded by Gabriele Ferretti	Archbishop of Fermo; 1842-1877	Succeeded by Amilcare Malagola
Preceded by Lodovico Altieri	Camerlengo of the Holy Roman Church; 1867 – 1877	Succeeded by Gioacchino Pecci
