= François Colimon =

Haitian Roman Catholic prelate (1934–2022)

His Excellency François Colimon
- Bishop Emeritus of Port-de-Paix
- Archdiocese: Cap-Haïtien
- Installed: 22 February 1982
- Term ended: 1 March 2008
- Predecessor: Rémy Jérôme Augustin
- Successor: Pierre-Antoine Paulo
- Previous post: Coadjutor Bishop of Port-de-Paix (1978–1982)

Orders
- Ordination: 11 February 1962
- Consecration: 8 December 1978 by Luigi Conti

Personal details
- Born: 10 July 1934 Gonaïves, American-occupied Haiti
- Died: 4 November 2022 (aged 88) Port-au-Prince, Haiti

François Colimon (10 July 1934 – 4 November 2022) was a Haitian Roman Catholic prelate.

Colimon was born in Haiti and was ordained to the priesthood in 1962. He served as coadjutor bishop of the Roman Catholic Diocese of Port-de-Paix from 1978 to 1982 and then served as the bishop of the diocese from 1982 until his resignation in 2008.

Catholic Church titles
Preceded by Rémy Jérôme Augustin	Bishop of Port-de-Paix; 1982–2008	Succeeded by Pierre-Antoine Paulo
Preceded by —	Coadjutor Bishop of Port-de-Paix; 1978–1982	Succeeded by –
