= Antonios Grigorios Voutsinos =

Antonios Grigorios Voutsinos AA
- Archbishop of Corfu, Zakynthos, and Cephalonia
- Native name: Αντώνιος-Γρηγόριος Βουτσίνος
- Church: Catholic Church
- Archdiocese: Archdiocese of Corfu, Zakynthos, and Cephalonia
- In office: 29 May 1947 – 6 July 1952
- Predecessor: Leonard Brindisi
- Successor: Antonios Varthalitis
- Other post: Titular Archbishop of Aprus (1952-1968)
- Previous post: Bishop of Syros (1937-1947)

Orders
- Ordination: 11 May 1918
- Consecration: 25 July 1937 by Angelo Giuseppe Roncalli

Personal details
- Born: 8 May 1891 Galissas, Syros, Kingdom of Greece
- Died: 23 April 1968 (aged 76)

Antonios Grigorios Voutsinos (Greek: Αντώνιος Γρηγόριος Βουτσίνος; Italian: Antonio Gregorio Vuccino; 8 May 1891 – 23 April 1968) was born in Galissas, Syros of Greece. He was ordained a priest of the Assumptionists in 1918, appointed bishop of Syros and Milos, Greece in 1937, Archbishop of Corfu, Zante and Cefalonia in 1947 and Archbishop of Aprus in 1952. He died as archbishop emeritus in 1968.
