= Diocese of Port-de-Paix =

Roman Catholic diocese in Haiti

Coordinates: 19.9386°N 72.8291°W

Diocese of Port-de-Paix Dioecesis Portus Pacis Cathédrale de l'Immaculée Conception

Location
- Country: Haiti
- Ecclesiastical province: Province of Cap-Haïtien
- Metropolitan: Port-de-Paix

Statistics
- Area: 4,500 km^{2} (1,700 sq mi)
- Population: Total; Catholics: (as of 2004); 550,000; 330,000 (60%)
- Parishes: 17

Information
- Denomination: Roman Catholic
- Rite: Latin Rite
- Established: 3 October 1861 (163 years ago)
- Cathedral: Cathedral of the Immaculate Conception

Current leadership
- Pope: Leo XIV
- Bishop: Charles Peters Barthelus

The Roman Catholic Diocese of Port-de-Paix (French: Diocèse catholique romain de Port-de-Paix; Latin: Romano-Catholicae Dioecesis Portus-de-Paix), erected 3 October 1861, is a suffragan of the Archdiocese of Cap-Haïtien.

== Bishops ==
=== Ordinaries ===
- Paul-Marie Le Bihain, S.M.M. (1928–1935)
- Albert-Marie Guiot, S.M.M. (1936–1975)
- Rémy Augustin, S.M.M. (1978–1982)
- François Colimon, S.M.M. (1982–2008)
- Pierre-Antoine Paulo, O.M.I. (2008–2020)
- Charles Peters Barthelus (2020–present)

=== Coadjutor bishops ===
- Rémy Jérôme Augustin, S.M.M. (1966–1978)
- François Colimon, S.M.M. (1978–1982)
- Pierre-Antoine Paulo, O.M.I. (2001–2008)

== External links and references ==
- "Diocese of Port-de-Paix". Catholic-Hierarchy.
- GCatholic.org page for this diocese
