= Pierre-Antoine Paulo =

Catholic bishop (1944–2021)

Pierre-Antoine Paulo OMI
- Bishop of Port-de-Paix
- Church: Catholic Church
- Diocese: Diocese of Port-de-Paix
- In office: 1 March 2008 – 14 April 2020
- Predecessor: François Colimon
- Successor: Charles Peters Barthélus
- Previous post: Coadjutor Bishop of Port-de-Paix (2001-2008)

Orders
- Ordination: 20 December 1969
- Consecration: 14 October 2001 by François Gayot

Personal details
- Born: 23 March 1944 Camp-Perrin, Sud, Haiti
- Died: 4 February 2021 (aged 76)

Styles of Pierre-Antoine Paulo OMI
- Reference style: The Most Reverend
- Spoken style: Your Excellency
- Religious style: Monsignor
- Posthumous style: not applicable

Pierre-Antoine Paulo, OMI (23 March 1944 – 4 February 2021) was a Haitian prelate of the Roman Catholic Church. He served as Bishop of Port-de-Paix from 2008 to 2020.

== Biography ==
Pierre-Antoine Paulo was born in Camp Perrin, and traveled to the United States at age eighteen to enter the novitiate of the Missionary Oblates of Mary Immaculate in Colebrook, New Hampshire. He made his profession as a member of that Roman Catholic religious institute on 2 August 1963, and then furthered his studies in philosophy and theology at Rome.

Paulo was ordained to the priesthood on 4 July 1969, and did pastoral work following his return to Haiti. In 1976, he was assigned to the formation of future missionaries, serving as a novice master and superior of the scholasticate. Paulo was later named President of the Conference of Religious in Haiti and provincial superior of his religious institute in Haiti. In the latter office, he undertook missionary work in Colombia as well.

On 7 July 2001, Paulo was appointed Coadjutor Bishop of Port-de-Paix by Pope John Paul II. He received his episcopal consecration on the following 14 October from Archbishop François Gayot, SMM, with Archbishop Hubert Constant, OMI, and Bishop François Colímon, SMM, serving as co-consecrators.

Paulo succeeded Colímon as Bishop of Port-de-Paix upon the latter's resignation on 1 March 2008. He is the first member of the Oblates of Mary Immaculate to hold that post.

Pope Francis accepted his resignation as Bishop of Port-de-Paix on 14 April 2020.

Preceded by François Colimon, SMM	Bishop of Port-de-Paix; 2008–2020	Succeeded by Charles Peters Barthelus
