= Alessandro Borgia =

Italian bishop and archbishop

Most Reverend Alessandro Borgia
- Archbishop of Fermo
- Church: Catholic
- Diocese: Fermo
- Appointed: 20 November 1724
- Term ended: 14 February 1764
- Previous post: Titular Bishop of Nocera Umbra (1716–1724)

Personal details
- Born: 6 November 1682 Velletri, Papal States
- Died: 14 February 1764 (aged 81) Fermo, Papal States
- Parents: Clemente Erminio Borgia and Cecilia Borgia (née Carboni)
- Education: Sapienza University of Rome

Ordination history
History
Episcopal consecration
- Principal consecrator: Giovanni Battista Bussi
- Co-consecrators: Domenico Zauli, Silvius de Cavalieri
- Date: 12 July 1716

Alessandro Borgia (1682, Velletri – 1764, Fermo) was an Italian bishop and archbishop.

== Life ==
From a collateral patrician branch of Borgia family, he was the son of Don Clemente Erminio Borgia of Velletri (1640-1711) and Cecilia Carboni (1663-1739). He studied theology and letters at the "Sapienza" and in 1706 followed Monsignor Bussi to Cologne as secretary to the legation there, succeeding him as nuncio on Bussi's promotion to cardinal in 1712. He remained in northern Europe until 1714, when he was made governor of Assisi, in 1716 becoming bishop of Nocera Umbra. He wanted to go to China as a representative of the Holy See but – impressed by the differences arising in the Chinese rites between the Jesuit and Franciscan missionaries and the Chinese emperor he chose to stay in Italy. In 1724 he was made archbishop of Fermo, remaining in that diocese until the end of his life.

A scholar, he was in correspondence with Ludovico Antonio Muratori. Borgia also wrote a history of his birthplace e delle diocesi che ha retto. From 1728 to 1730 he also collected historical documents relating to the history of the Fermo archdiocese, forming the foundation of the diocesan archive of Fermo. Alessandro's nephew Stefano Borgia was put under his guardianship by Stefano's parents when the boy was nine years old, and Alessandro handed down his love of culture to him – Stefano edited Alessandro's works after the latter's death and also created the Museo Borgiano in Velletri.

== Works ==
- Cerimonie della messa solenne cavate dalle rubriche, sagri cerimoniali, e dalla più esatta prattica delle basiliche di Roma stampate per ordine di monsignor Alessandro Borgia arcivescovo, e prencipe di Fermo per commodo di tutta la sua diocesi ..., In Roma, mella stamperia di Generoso Salomone : a' spese di Gio. Lorenzo Barbiellini, 1745.
- Del Regno di Maria, omelie, In Velletri, per Cesare Sartori stampatore vesc. e pubblico, 1782.
- Della cristiana educazione de' figliuoli, omelia detta da Alessandro Borgia Arcivescovo, Principe di Fermo, Fermo, appresso il Lazzarini Stamp. Arciv., 1760.
- Della cristiana educazione de' figliuoli. Omelie dette da Alessandro Borgia ..., In Napoli, presso Giuseppe De Dominicis, 1776.
- Vita di san Geraldo vescouo, e protettore dell'inclita città di Velletri raccolta da diuersi autori, che ne trattano, e dedicata all'eminentiss. ... cardinale Alessandro Cybo ... da Alessandro Borgia, In Velletri, per Onofrio Piccini, 1698.
- Benedicti XIII romani pontificis ex ordine praedicatorum vita commentario excepta et Benedicto XIV dicata ab Alexandro Borgia ..., Romae, typis & sumptibus Bernabo & Lazzarini ad Fontem Trivii, 1741.
- Del regno di Maria. Omelie di monsignor Alessandro Borgia ... ridotte alle stampe da monsignore Stefano Borgia ..., In Como, appresso Francesco Scotti, 1785.
- Delle lodi del b. Benedetto XI Dell'Ordine dei Predicatori. Omelia Dell'Ill.mo, e R.mo Signore monsignor Alessandro Borgia arcivescovo, e principe di Fermo. Dedicata Al merito sempre grande dell'E.mo, e R.mo Principe il signor cardinale Vincenzo Ludovico Gotti dell'Ordine dei Predicatori, Fermo, per Dom. Ant. Bolis, e frat. stamp. priorali, arcivesc., e del S. Uffizio, 1740.
- Alessandro Borgia per la Dio grazia, e della Santa Sede apostolica arcivescovo, e prencipe di Fermo della Santità di Nostro Signore papa Clemente 12. prelato domestico, & assistente, Fermo, per Gio. Francesco de' Monti, e frat. stampatori arcivescovali, 1736 (editor)
- Indulto sopra il precetto di astenersi dalle opere servili in alcune feste, e riforma di varj abusi circa l'osservanza dello stesso precetto nelle domeniche, ed in altri giorni festivi dell'anno, Fermo, per Dom. Ant. Bolis, e frat. stamp. arcivescovili, 1746.
- Istoria della Chiesa, e città di Velletri descritta in quattro libri e dedicata all'eminentissimo e reverendissimo principe il sig. cardinale D. Bernardo Conti da Alessandro Borgia vescovo di Nocera, In Nocera, per Antonio Mariotti, stampator vescovale, 1723.
- Istruzzione per l'estirpazione delle bestemmie in vano il santissimo nome di Dio e de santi suoi, Fermo, per Gio: Francesco de Monti, e Frat.stamp. arcivesc. e Cam., 1746.
- Omelie dette da Alessandro Borgia arcivescovo e principe di Fermo in varie funzioni pontificali della stessa città ..., In Camerino, nella stamperia del Gabrielli, 1739.
- Omelie dette da Alessandro Borgia arcivescovo e principe di Fermo in varie funzioni pontificali nella stessa città dall'anno 1745. fino alla festa de' santi apostoli Pietro e Paolo del 1753, In Fermo, per Filippo, e Fabio Maria Lazzarini, 1757.
- Omelie di Alessandro Borgia arcivescovo e principe di Fermo in varie solennità, e funzioni pastorali mentre egli era vescovo di Nocera nell'Umbria ..., In Camerino, appo il Gabrielli per Giuseppe de Trinci, 1734.
- Sagre omelie di monsignore don Alessandro Borgia arcivescovo e principe di Fermo intorno all'augustissimo sagrificio dell'altare, In Perugia, presso Carlo Baduel, 1795.

== Sources ==
- A. Alfieri, LA CRONACA della Diocesi Nocerina nell'Umbria scritta dal suo vescovo Alessandro Borgia, Roma, Desclèe, 1910.
- Pignatelli, Giuseppe (1970). "BORGIA, Alessandro". Dizionario Biografico degli Italiani (in Italian). Vol. 12: Bonfadini–Borrello. Rome: Institute of the Italian Encyclopaedia. ISBN 978-88-12-00032-6.
