= Norberto Perini =

Italian prelate (1888–1977)

- Archbishop of the Archdiocese of Fermo
- Church: Roman Catholic Church
- Archdiocese: Fermo
- See: Archdiocese of Fermo
- Appointed: 22 October 1941
- Installed: 5 January 1942
- Term ended: 21 June 1976
- Predecessor: Ercole Attuoni
- Successor: Cleto Bellucci
- Previous post: Provost of Busto Arsizio

Orders
- Ordination: 7 July 1912 by Andrea Carlo Ferrari
- Consecration: 30 November 1941 by Ildefonso Schuster

Personal details
- Born: 6 June 1888 Carpiano, Province of Milan, Kingdom of Italy
- Died: 9 December 1977 (aged 89) Rho, Province of Milan, Italy

Norberto Perini (Carpiano, 6 June 1888 – Rho, 9 December 1977), was an Italian Catholic prelate who served as the bishop of the Archdiocese of Fermo from 1941 to 1976. He previously served as the Provost of Busto Arsizio, from 1935 to 1942.

== Early life ==
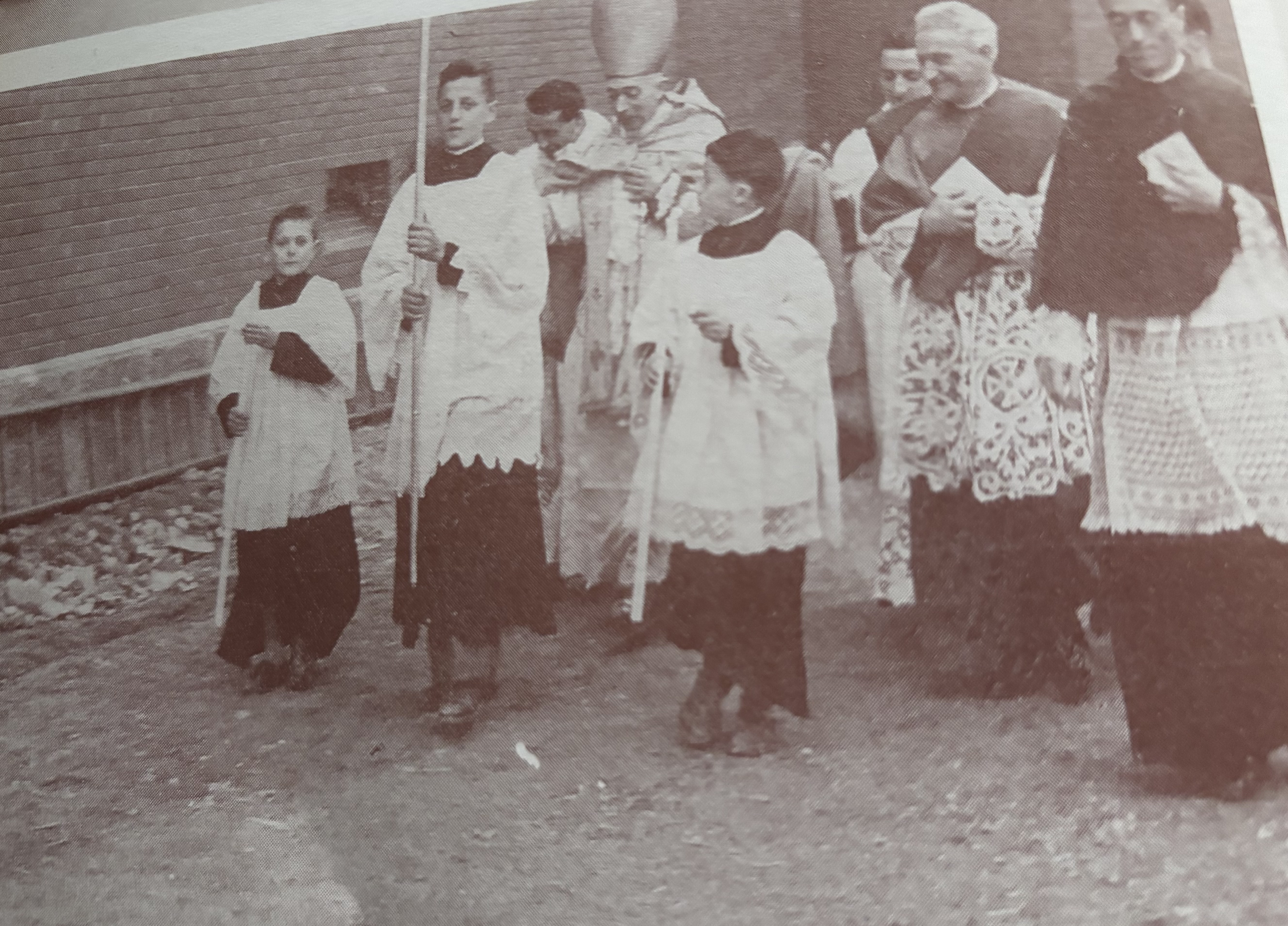
Ambrogio Gianotti (far right), Cardinal Schuster, and Perini (second from the right) during the consecration of the Church of St. Edward, Busto Arsizio

Norberto Perini was born on 6 June 188 in Carpiano, a comune in the province of Milan. He was one of 12 children, and his youngest brother was the senator Carlo Perini. He was ordained on 7 July 1912 by the then Archbishop of Milan, Cardinal Andrea Carlo Ferrari, in the Duomo of Milan. In 1935 he was appointed parish priest of the Basilica of San Giovanni Battista, Busto Arsizio, and Provost of Busto Arsizio, a position he held until 1942.

== Archbishop of Fermo ==
On 22 October 1941, Pope Pius XII appointed Perini as Archbishop of Fermo; succeeding Ercole Attuoni, who had died on 31 May 1941. On 30 November 1941 he received his episcopal ordination in the Basilica of San Giovanni Battista of Busto Arsizio by the Archbishop of Milan, Ildefonso Schuster, Enrico Montalbetti, Archbishop of Reggio Calabria, and Enrico Castelli, Bishop of Messene. On 5 January 1942 he officially assumed the role of Archbishop.

From 1952, he supported the initiatives undertaken by Don Ernesto Ricci and Maria Josefa Alhama y Valera, such as the founding of the Artigianelli del Sacro Cuore. He served as president of the Episcopal Commission for Cultural Activities for the Episcopal Conference of Italy. On 21 June 1976, Pope Paul VI accepted his resignation, submitted on grounds of reaching the age limit and health problems, from the pastoral leadership of the Archdiocese of Fermo; he was succeeded by Coadjutor Archbishop Cleto Bellucci.

Perini died on 9 December 1977, aged 89, in Rho.
