= Amilcare Malagola =

Italian Catholic cardinal

His Eminence Amilcare Malagola
- Archbishop of Fermo
- Church: Roman Catholic Church
- Archdiocese: Fermo
- See: Fermo
- Appointed: 21 September 1877
- Term ended: 22 June 1895
- Predecessor: Filippo de Angelis
- Successor: Roberto Papiri
- Other post: Cardinal-Priest of Santa Balbina (1893–95)
- Previous post: Bishop of Ascoli Piceno (1876–77)

Orders
- Ordination: 19 December 1863
- Consecration: 9 July 1876 by Filippo de Angelis
- Created cardinal: 16 January 1893 by Pope Leo XIII
- Rank: Cardinal-Priest

Personal details
- Born: Amilcare Malagola; 24 December 1840 Modena, Duchy of Modena and Reggio
- Died: 22 June 1895 (aged 54) Fermo, Kingdom of Italy
- Education: Pontifical Gregorian University; Pontifical Roman Athenaeum Saint Apollinare

Amilcare Malagola (24 December 1840 in Modena, Italy – 22 June 1895 in Modena, Italy) was a Cardinal of the Catholic Church, and was archbishop of Fermo 1877–1895.

He studied in Rome and gained doctorates in philosophy and theology in 1864.

He was made cardinal by Pope Leo XIII in 1893.

He founded the Philosophical Academy of St. Thomas Aquinas.
