= Pietro Dini =

Most Reverend Pietro Dini
- Prince Archbishop of Fermo
- Church: Catholic Church
- Archdiocese: Archdiocese of Fermo
- In office: 1621–1625
- Predecessor: Alessandro Strozzi
- Successor: Giovanni Battista Rinuccini

Orders
- Consecration: 9 May 1621 by Ottavio Bandini

Personal details
- Born: June 1578 Florence
- Died: August 1625 (aged 47) Fermo, Italy

Pietro Dini (born in Florence 1578 from Agostino Dini and Ginevra Bandini died Fermo 1625) was Consul of Crusca Academy in the year 1605, Referee of the Tribunal of the Apostolic Segnature and after a Catholic prelate who served as Archbishop of Fermo (1621–1625).

== Biography ==
On 19 April 1621, Pietro Dini was appointed during the papacy of Pope Gregory XV as Archbishop of Fermo. On 9 May 1621, he was consecrated bishop by Ottavio Bandini, Cardinal-Bishop of Palestrina, with Galeazzo Sanvitale, Archbishop Emeritus of Bari-Canosa, and Luca Alemanni, Bishop Emeritus of Volterra, serving as co-consecrators. He served as Archbishop of Fermo until his death in August 1625.

== Episcopal succession ==
While bishop, he was the principal co-consecrator of:

- Alexandre della Stufa, Bishop of Montepulciano (1623); and
- Lorenzo Campeggi, Bishop of Cesena (1624).

He also ordained Giulio Cesare Sacchetti (1623) to the priesthood.

Catholic Church titles
Preceded by Alessandro Strozzi	Archbishop of Fermo; 1621–1625	Succeeded by Giovanni Battista Rinuccini
