= Luigi Conti (archbishop of Fermo) =

Italian Roman Catholic archbishop (1941–2021)

- Archdiocese: Fermo
- See: Fermo
- Appointed: 13 April 2006
- Installed: 4 June 2006
- Term ended: 14 September 2017
- Predecessor: Benito Gennaro Franceschetti
- Successor: Rocco Pennacchio

Orders
- Ordination: 26 June 1965
- Consecration: 21 September 1996 by Pope John Paul II

Personal details
- Born: 30 May 1941 Urbania, Kingdom of Italy
- Died: 30 September 2021 (aged 80) Fermo, Italy

Luigi Conti (30 May 1941 – 30 September 2021) was an Italian prelate of the Catholic Church who was Archbishop of Fermo from 2006 to 2017.

== Biography ==
Luigi Conti was born on 30 May 1941 in Urbania, in the Province of Pesaro, Italy. He studied at the local seminary and the regional seminary in Fano and was ordained a priest on 26 June 1965. He earned his licentiate in theology at the Pontifical Lateran University in 1968. In 1978 he became a priest of the Diocese of Rome.

Pope John Paul II named him Bishop of Macerata-Tolentino-Recanati-Cingoli-Treia on 28 June 1996. He received his episcopal consecration on 21 September.

On 13 April 2006, Pope Benedict XVI appointed him Archbishop of Fermo.

On 3 June 2013, Pope Francis named him Apostolic Administrator of Ascoli Piceno, a position he filled until the installation of Giovanni D’Ercole as the new bishop there on 10 May 2014.

Pope Francis accepted his resignation as Archbishop of Fermo on 14 September 2017.
