= Alessandro Strozzi (archbishop of Fermo) =

Roman Catholic Prelate

Most Reverend Alessandro Strozzi
- Archbishop of Fermo
- Church: Catholic Church
- Archdiocese: Archdiocese of Fermo
- In office: 1606–1621
- Predecessor: Ottavio Bandini
- Successor: Pietro Dini

Personal details
- Died: 1621 Fermo, Italy

Alessandro Strozzi (died 1621) was a Roman Catholic prelate who served as Archbishop of Fermo (1606–1621).

== Biography ==
On 10 April 1606, he was appointed during the papacy of Pope Paul V as Archbishop of Fermo. He served as Archbishop of Fermo until his death in 1621. While bishop, he was the principal co-consecrator of Paolo Emilio Sfondrati, Bishop of Cremona (1607).

Catholic Church titles
Preceded by Ottavio Bandini	Archbishop of Fermo; 1606–1621	Succeeded by Pietro Dini
