= Giovanni Battista Rinuccini =

Roman Catholic archbishop and papal nuncio

- Archbishop of Fermo
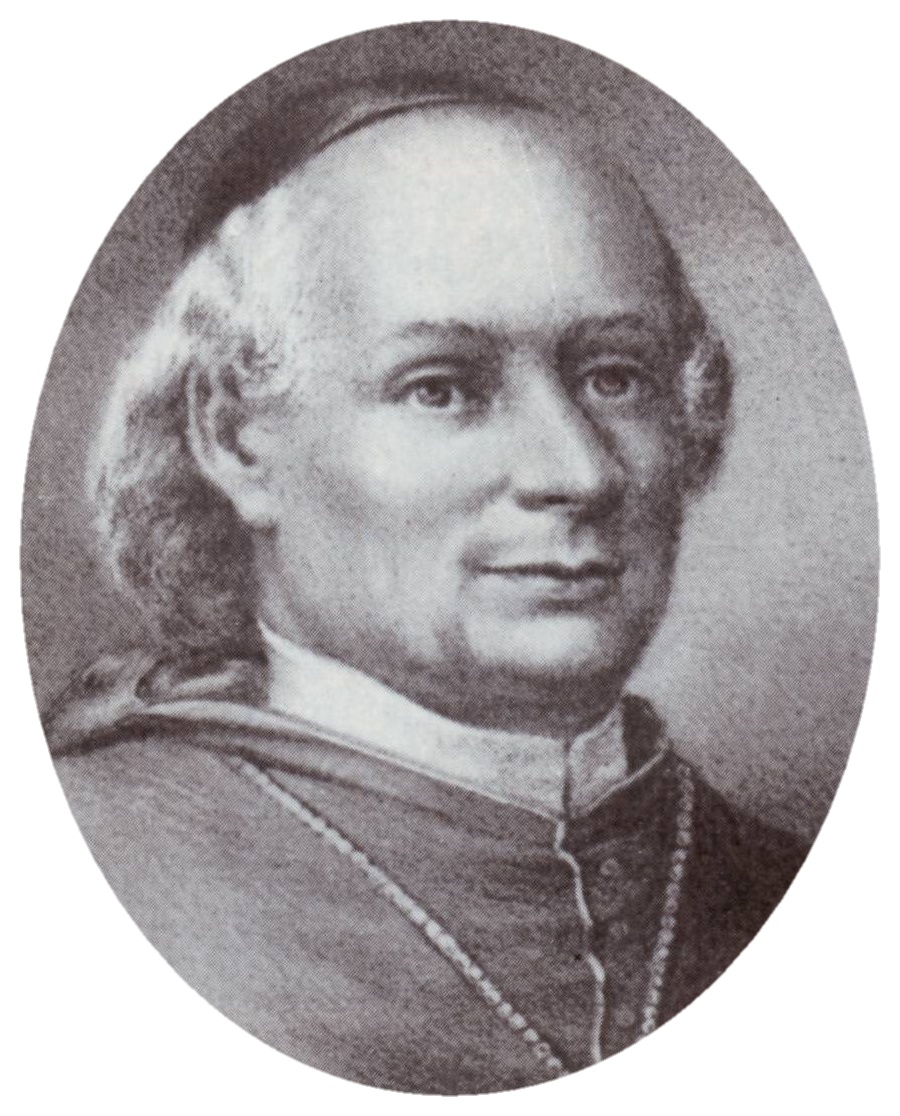
- Church: Catholic Church
- Archdiocese: Archdiocese of Fermo
- In office: 6 October 1625 – 13 December 1653
- Predecessor: Pietro Dini
- Successor: Carlo Gualterio
- Previous post: Apostolic Nuncio to Ireland (1645-1649)

Orders
- Ordination: 1642
- Consecration: 28 October 1625 by Ottavio Bandini

Personal details
- Born: 15 September 1592 Rome, Papal States
- Died: 13 December 1653 (aged 61) Fermo, March of Ancona, Papal States

Giovanni Battista Rinuccini (1592–1653) was an Italian Roman Catholic archbishop in the mid-seventeenth century. He was a noted legal scholar and became chamberlain to Pope Gregory XV. In 1625 Pope Urban VIII made him the Archbishop of Fermo in Italy. In 1645 Pope Innocent X sent him to Ireland as Papal Nuncio. He brought money and weapons to help the Confederate Irish in its conflict against the English Parliamentarians. Rinuccini became the dominant figure of the hard-line Clerical Faction of the Confederates refusing the alliance with the Irish Royalists.

== Early life ==
Rinuccini was born in Rome on 15 September 1592. He was the son of a Florentine patrician, his mother, Virginia di Pier Antonio Bandini was a sister of Cardinal Ottavio Bandini, who was bishop of Ostia and Velletri and dean of the Sacred College of Cardinals. Rinuccini was educated by the Jesuits in Rome and studied law at the Universities of Bologna and Perugia, in due course, he was ordained a priest, having at the age of twenty-two obtained his doctor's degree from the University of Pisa. He was accepted into the Accademia della Crusca, and Galileo Galilei proposed him for membership of the Accademia dei Lincei in 1616. Returning to serve his uncle at Rome, although a fever, perhaps malaria, permanently damaged his health, he won distinction as an advocate in the ecclesiastical courts, was named a camariere (chamberlain) by Pope Gregory XV and in 1625 became Archbishop of Fermo. In 1631 he carefully refused an offer to be made archbishop of Florence.

== Irish mission ==
On 15 September 1644 a new pope Pope Innocent X was elected. He decided to step up the help for the Irish Catholic Confederates. He sent Rinuccini as nuncio to Ireland to replace the envoy Friar Pierfrancesco Scarampi who had been sent to Ireland by his predecessor, the pope Urban VIII, in 1643.

=== Arrival ===
Rinuccini departed France from Saint-Martin-de-Ré near La Rochelle on 18 October 1645 on the frigate San Pietro and arrived in Kenmare, County Kerry, on 21 or 22 October 1645 with a retinue of twenty-six Italians, several Irish officers, and the Confederation's secretary, Richard Bellings. He proceeded to Kilkenny, the Confederate capital, where Mountgarret, the president of the Confederation, received him at the castle. Rinuccini spoke Latin to him, whereas all the official business of the Confederates was done in English. He asserted in his discourse that the object of his mission was to sustain the King, but above all to help the Catholic people of Ireland in securing the free and public exercise of their religion, and the restoration of the churches and church property to the Catholic Church.

Rinuccini had sent ahead arms and ammunition: 1,000 braces of pistols, 4,000 cartridge belts, 2000 swords, 500 muskets and 20,000 pounds of gunpowder. He arrived twelve days later with a further two thousand muskets and cartridge-belts, four thousand swords, four hundred braces of pistols, two thousand pike-heads, and twenty thousand pounds of gunpowder, fully equipped soldiers and sailors and 150,658 livres tournois to finance the Irish Catholic war effort. These supplies gave him a huge input into the Confederate's internal politics because the Nuncio doled out the money and arms for specific military projects, rather than handing them over to the Confederate government, or Supreme Council.

Rinuccini hoped that by doing so he could influence the Confederates' strategic policy away from making a deal with Charles I and the Royalists in the English Civil War and towards the foundation of an independent Catholic-ruled Ireland. In particular, Rinuccini wanted to ensure that churches and lands taken in the rebellion would remain in Catholic hands. This was consistent with what happened in Catholic-controlled areas during the Thirty Years' War in Germany. His mission can be seen as part of the Counter-Reformation in Europe. The Nuncio also had unrealistic hopes of using Ireland as a base to re-establish Catholicism in England. However, apart from some military successes such as the Battle of Benburb on 5 June 1646, the main result of Rinuccini's efforts was to aggravate the infighting between factions within the Confederates.

=== Faction fighting ===
The Confederates' Supreme Council was dominated by wealthy landed magnates, predominantly of "Old English" origin, who were anxious to come to a deal with the Stuart monarchy that would guarantee them their land ownership, full civil rights for Catholics, and toleration of Catholicism. They formed the moderate faction, which was opposed by those within the Confederation, who wanted better terms, including self-government for Ireland, a reversal of the land confiscations of the plantations of Ireland and establishment of Catholicism as the state religion. A particularly sore point in the negotiations with the English Royalists was the insistence of some Irish Catholics on keeping in Catholic hands the churches taken in the war. Rinuccini accepted the assurances of the Supreme Council that such concerns would be addressed in the peace treaty negotiated with Ormond, negotiated in 1646, now known as the First Ormond Peace.

However, when the terms were published, they granted only the private practice of Catholicism. Alleging that he had been deliberately deceived, Rinuccini publicly backed the militant faction, which included most of the Catholic clergy and some Irish military commanders such as Owen Roe O'Neill; on the other side there were the Franciscans Pierre Marchant, and later Raymond Caron. In 1646, when the Supreme Council tried to get the Ormond Peace ratified, Rinuccini excommunicated them and helped to get the Treaty voted down in the Confederate General Assembly. The Assembly had the members of the Supreme Council arrested for treason and elected a new Supreme Council.

=== Defeat ===
However, the following year, the Confederates' attempts to drive the remaining English (mainly Parliamentarian) armies from Ireland met with disaster at the battles of Dungans Hill on 8 August 1647 and Knocknanuss on 13 November 1647. As a result, the chastened Confederates hastily concluded a new deal with the English Royalists to try to prevent a Parliamentarian conquest of Ireland in 1648. Although the terms of this second deal were better than those of the first one, Rinuccini again tried to overturn the treaty. However, on this occasion, the Catholic clergy were split on whether to accept the deal, as were the Confederate military commanders and the General Assembly. Ultimately, the treaty was accepted by the Confederacy, which then dissolved itself and joined a Royalist coalition. Rinuccini backed Owen Roe O'Neill, who used his Ulster army to fight against his former comrades who had accepted the deal. The Nuncio tried in vain to repeat his success of 1646 by excommunicating those who supported the peace. However, the Irish bishops were split on the issue and so Rinuccini's authority was diluted. Militarily, Owen Roe O'Neill was unable to reverse the political balance; despairing of the Catholic cause in Ireland, Rinuccini left the country embarking on 23 February 1649 at Galway on the ship that had brought him to Ireland, the frigate San Pietro. In the same year, Oliver Cromwell led a Parliamentarian re-conquest of the country, after which Catholicism was thoroughly repressed. Roman Catholic worship was banned, Irish Catholic-owned land was widely confiscated east of the Shannon, and captured Catholic clergy were executed.

== Return to Italy and death ==
Rinuccini returned to Rome in November 1649 where he presented the Pope with a repport entitled "Relazione delle cose in Irlanda", which recounts his stay in Ireland in 36 chapters. (Note: Report in Italian The same in English) Rinuccini returned to his diocese in Fermo in June 1650. He died on 13 December 1653 in Fermo.

== Commentarius Rinuccinianus ==
Rinuccini had planned to write a detailed account of his mission after his return to Fermo and had asked two Irish Capuchin friars, Richard O'Ferrall and Robert O'Connell, to come to Fermo to help him with that task. After his death, the two Cupuchins wrote in Florence the work now called the Commentarius Rinuccinianus in five volumes. It stayed in manuscript form and would only be printed in 1949.

This account blames personal vainglory and tribal divisions for the Catholic disunity in Ireland. In particular, it blames the Old English for the eventual Catholic defeat. The Gaelic Irish, it claimed are more sincere Catholics, despite being less civilised.

== Literary works ==
Rinuccini wrote books on philosophy, rhetoric, history and geography. While he considered his religious writings his most important works, his most popular book was Il Cappuccino Scozzese (Italian pronunciation: [il kapputˈtʃiːno skotˈtseːze]) (The Scottish Capuchin), a fictionalised life of the Scottish monk George Leslie.
