= Antonios Varthalitis =

Antonios Varthalitis AA
- Archbishop of Corfu, Zakynthos, and Cephalonia
- Native name: Αντώνιος Βαρθαλίτης
- Church: Catholic Church
- Archdiocese: Archdiocese of Corfu, Zakynthos, and Cephalonia
- In office: 30 May 1962 – 22 March 2003
- Predecessor: Antonios Grigorios Voutsinos
- Successor: Yannis Spiteris
- Other post: Apostolic Administrator of Thessaloniki (1992-2003)

Orders
- Ordination: 11 January 1953
- Consecration: 5 August 1962 by Venediktos Printesis

Personal details
- Born: 1 January 1924 Vari, Syros, Kingdom of Greece
- Died: 27 October 2007 (aged 83) Athens, Greece

Antonios Varthalitis, AA (Greek: Αντώνιος Βαρθαλίτης; 1 January 1924 in – 27 October 2007) was from 1962 to 2003 Catholic Archbishop of the Roman Catholic Archdiocese of Corfu, Zakynthos and Cephalonia.

== Life ==
Antonios Varthalitis joined the Congregation of the Assumption (Augustinians of the Assumption) in Athens. He studied theology and philosophy in Lyon. On 11 January 1953, Varthalitis was ordained as a Catholic priest. He served as a priest in the parish of Saints Peter and Paul in Piraeus and engaged in the ecumenical movement with the Greek Orthodox Church.

In 1962 he was named by Pope John XXIII as Archbishop of the Archdiocese of Corfu, Kefalonia and Zakynthos. From 1962 to 1964 Varthalitis participated of the I, II, III and IV sessions of the II Vatican Council. The episcopal ordination was done by Venediktos Printesis, Roman Catholic Archbishop of Athens. Pope John Paul II in 1992 named him the first Apostolic Vicar of Thessaloniki.

Varthalitis became involved in the Commission of the Bishops' Conferences of the European Community (COMECE) and the Council of European Bishops' Conferences (CCEE).

In 2003 his resignation was accepted by John Paul II.
