= Francis Joseph Nicholson =

Roman Catholic archbishop of Corfu (1803–1855)

Francis Joseph Nicholson O.C.D.
- Archbishop of Corfù
- Church: Catholic Church
- Archdiocese: Archdiocese of Corfù
- In office: May 1852 – 30 April 1855
- Predecessor: Pietro Antonio Nostrano
- Successor: Carlo Rivelli
- Previous posts: Titular Bishop of Hierapolis in Isauria (1846-1852); Coadjutor Archbishop of Corfù (1846-1852)

Orders
- Ordination: 1828
- Consecration: 24 May 1846 by Giacomo Filippo Fransoni

Personal details
- Born: 29 April 1803 Dublin, United Kingdom of Great Britain and Ireland
- Died: 30 April 1855 (aged 52)

Francis Joseph Nicholson OCD (29 April 1803 – 30 April 1855) was a Discalced Carmelite and archbishop of Corfu, then in the United States of the Ionian Islands, a British protectorate. He was born in Dublin, Ireland.

Around the middle of the 19th century, he played a role in an attempt to establish diplomatic recognition between the Holy See and the United Kingdom.

== Chronology ==
- 23 March 1825: vows in the Order of the Discalced Brothers of the Blessed Virgin Mary of Mount Carmel
- 1828: ordained to priesthood
- 27 March 1846: appointed Titular Bishop of Tamasus (did not take effect)
- 12 May 1846: appointed Coadjutor Archbishop of Corfu, Ionian Islands, assisting incumbent Pier-Antonio Nostrano, with the title of a Titular Bishop of Hierapolis
- 24 May 1846: ordained Titular Bishop of Hierapolis
- May 1852: succeeded as Archbishop of Corfu
