= Cathedral of Saint James and Saint Christopher =

Coordinates: 39.6236°N 19.9219°E

Cathedral of Saint Jacob and Saint Christopher
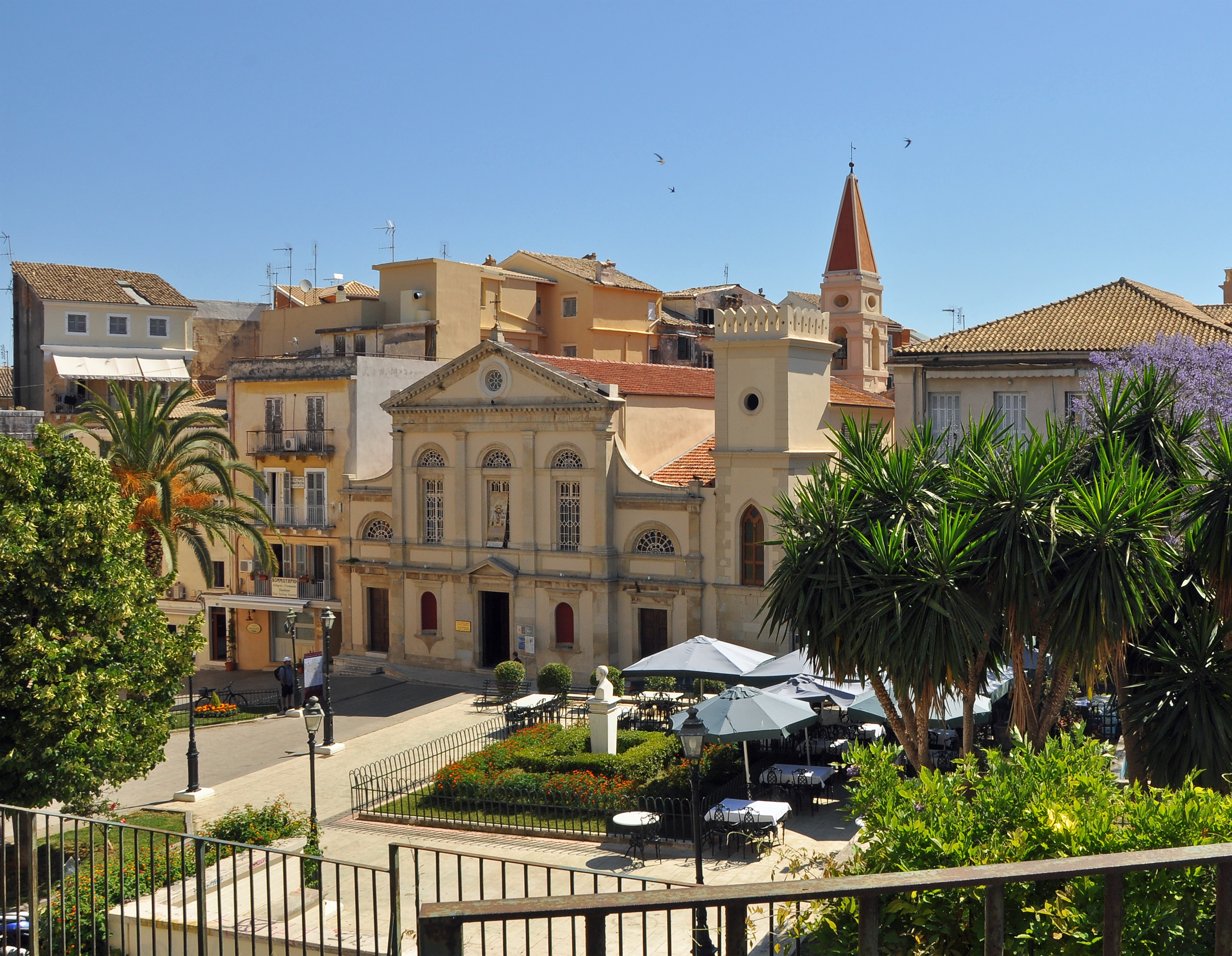
- Cathedral of Saint James and Saint Christopher, Corfu
- Cathedral of Saint Jacob and Saint Christopher
- Location: Corfu
- Country: Greece

Administration
- Diocese: Roman Catholic Archdiocese of Corfu, Zakynthos and Cephalonia

The Cathedral of Saint Jacob and Saint Christopher (Greek: Καθεδρικός Ναός Αγίου Χριστοφόρου και Ιακώβου) or the Catholic Metropolitan Church (Greek: Ιερός Καθολικός Μητροπολιτικός Ναός, Italian: Duomo is the seat of the Roman Catholic Archdiocese of Corfu, Zakynthos and Cephalonia. The church houses an extensive collection of paintings one of the most important is the Virgin Vrefokratousa Enthroned by Konstantinos Tzanes painted in 1654.

== History of the building ==
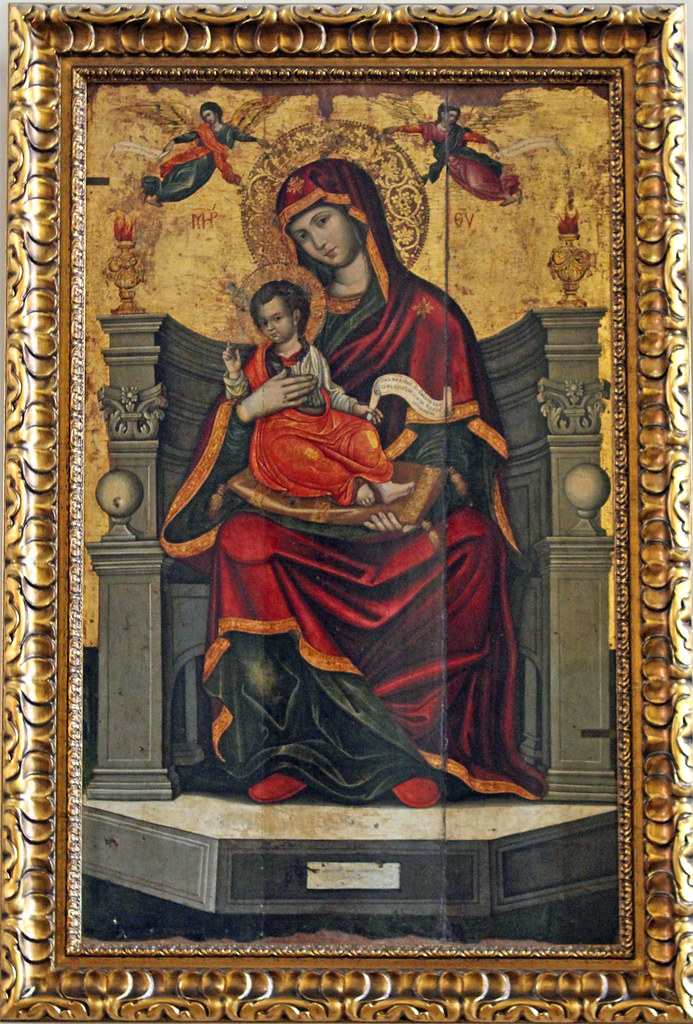
Virgin and Child by Konstantinos Tzanes

The old cathedral was located in the Old Fortress of Corfu city and was dedicated to the apostles Peter and Paul. This church was one of the oldest monuments of the Old Fortress and originally served as an Orthodox cathedral. From the 13th to the 17th century it became the Catholic cathedral. Originally the church was a three-aisled basilica. A small chapel dedicated to Saint Arsenius was built next to it. Saint Arsenius was the first bishop of Corfu (876-952), hailing from Bithynia of Judea.

In the 15th century the Fraternity of Saint James and Saint Christopher requested permission from Archbishop Martinus Bernardini to build an alms-house for the poor, a hospital, and a hotel for travelers. Next to the alms-house a church was supposed to be built. Permission was granted by the Pope on July 7, 1466. The brotherhood was also required to hire a priest and set up a church committee. Every year the church of Rome on February 2 provided one pound of candles to commemorate the transfer of icons of Saint James and Saint Christopher from the church of Saint Francis to the new church. In another version of the story, two small churches were built to commemorate Saint Jason and Sosipater. About one hundred years later on December 31, 1533, Bishop Jacobus Cocco consecrated the Church of Saint James and Saint Christopher.

During the second Ottoman siege in 1571, the church suffered damages. The Historical Archive of Venice preserves a draft of the 1622 proposal showing the extension of the building because it was too small for the needs of a cathedral. In 1658, it was renovated by Archbishop Carolus Labia at his own expense. During his tenure as the archbishop of Corfu, Labia added the official celebration of Saint Spyridon. After a reconstruction, it was declared the Catholic cathedral of the diocese in August 1632. Around the same period, the provveditore generale Filippo Pasqualigo ordered the Latin Bishop Benedictus Bragadinus (1620-1623) to transfer the bones of Saint Arsenius from the church to the Diocese. A famous painting of the Virgin and Child was completed by Greek painter Konstantinos Tzanes in 1654, it is preserved in the church. His brother Emmanuel Tzanes finished the Lady the Lambovitissa thirty years later because a church from the same island ordered a similar painting but Konstantinos Tzanes was unable to finish the work and his brother completed a more traditional version.

On October 23, 1709, the church was renovated again by the Latin Archbishop Augustinus Zacco (1706-1723), but it was destroyed in 1718 by a fire caused by an explosion of gunpowder. A smaller building was rebuilt. The Greek Orthodox Church built a small chapel inside the cathedral dedicated to Saint Arsenius. Another renovation was carried out by Engineer Serpieri in 1905. On the night of September 13, 1943, the church was bombed by the German Luftwaffe, almost completely destroying its interior. The catholic diocese returned the bones of Saint Arsenius to the church in 1944.

== Final form of the building ==
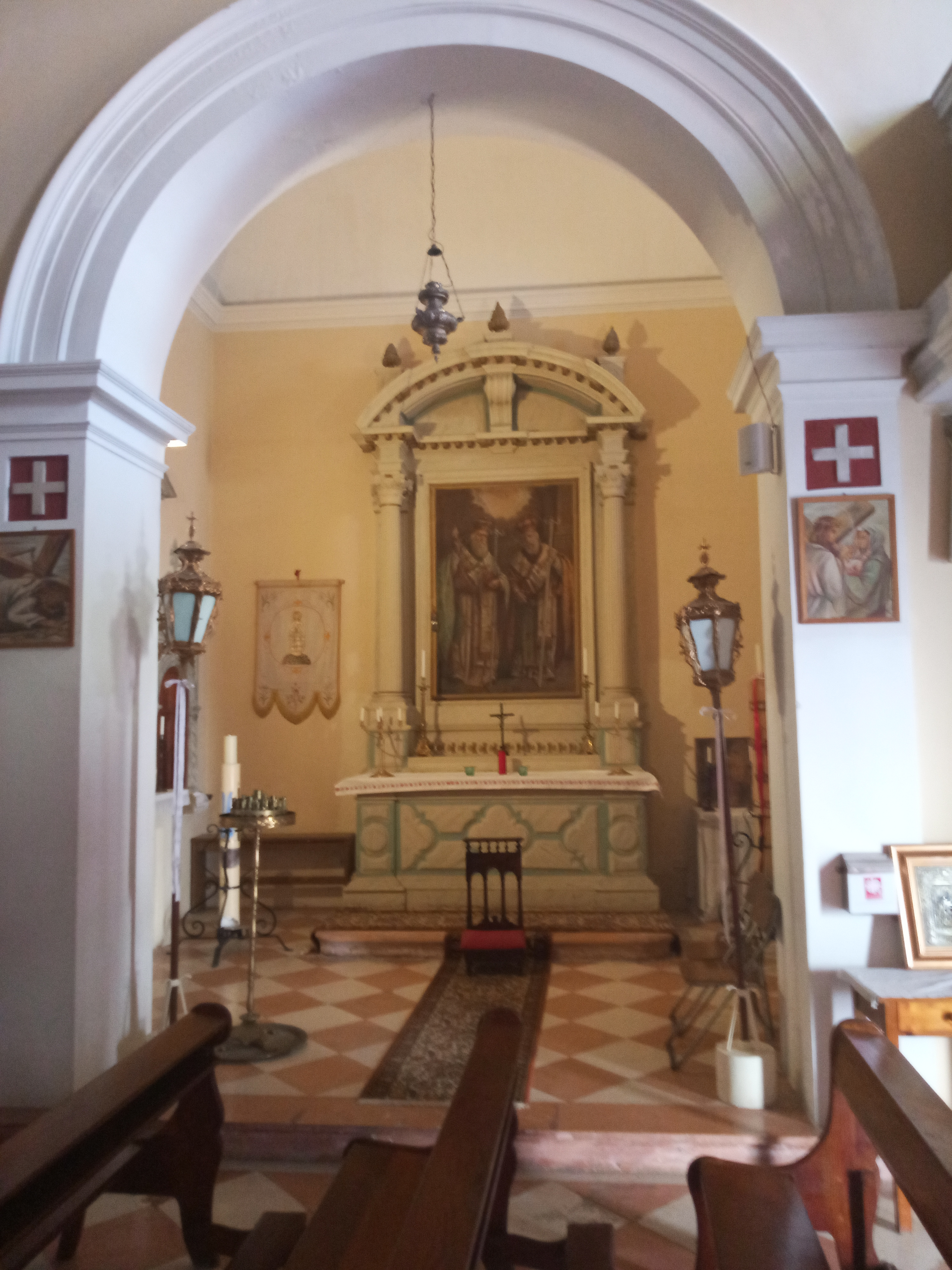
Interior

The final form of the building after the additional extensions is an aisled wooden roofed basilica with three-sided chapels on each side. They are monastic vaults connected to the main aisle with arched openings) and a polygonal sanctuary particularly created in impressive size. Before the repair, the main altar was once located deep in the Sanctuary and covered with ciborium. It was configured in parts, with architectural elements and sculptures from the Temple of the Annunciation. The total area of the Cathedral (Temple and aisles) is about 600 sq.m.

Access to the temple is from the west side, there are three doorways, a main central door, and two symmetrical other doors. The inner side is shaped like a balcony. It features a narrow body and has been rebuilt from reinforced concrete. The floor rested on four marble columns with very old trunks from an Old Fortress or from an ancient temple and capitals from the later part of the 17th century. The roof of the main temple is situated at a height of 9.20 meters from the floor, around the base of the gable roof, which nests beams indicated in the plans of the stent. Records show that before the war it was decorated with pictures of Christ, the Virgin Mary and the Apostles.

The exterior of the church was transformed in the early 20th century. The central part of the facade comprises three parts, they are organized on (Tuscan pilasters) in a two-story layout and result in a triangular pediment. Curved blades connect the ends and lower portions of the central building. The theme is reminiscent of the Late Baroque churches of Venice. Most of them are based on the design of the Church of the Gesù. The front is accompanied by a Gothic tower, while the bell and steeple are relatively small, they feature a pyramidal ending in the back next to the sanctuary.

== Chapels inside the church ==
- Chapel of Saint Spyridon and Saint Arsenius inside the church
- Chapel with the Byzantine icon of Our Lady of Health
- Chapel of St. Theresa of Lizzie
- Chapel of Saint Spyridon and Saint Arsenius
- Chapel of Immaculate Conception of Mary
- Chapel of Panachrantos Sacrament of the Eucharist

== Sources ==
- https://web.archive.org/web/20150313150014/http://www.catholic-church-corfu.org/duomo.html
