= Psaila =

Psaila is a Maltese surname. Notable people with the surname include:

- Dun Karm Psaila (1871–1961), priest, writer and poet regarded as the "National Poet of Malta"
- Gejtu Psaila (1893–1968), footballer
- Giuseppe Psaila (1891–1960), Art Nouveau architect
- Jes Psaila (born 1964), guitarist
- Natalie Psaila, Maltese doctor and abortion-rights activist
- Pippo Psaila (born 1957), football coach
- Salvatore Psaila (1798–1871), Maltese sculptor
