= Archdiocese of Fermo =

Roman Catholic archdiocese in Italy

Coordinates: 43.1667°N 13.7167°E

Archdiocese of Fermo Archidioecesis Firmana

Catholic
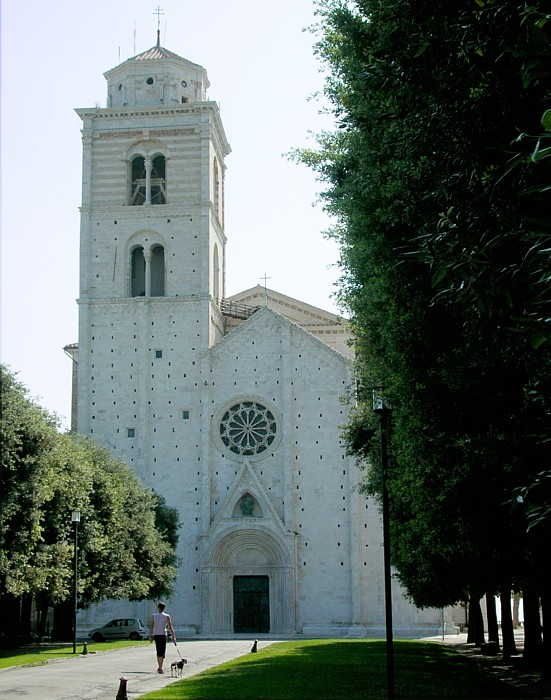
- Fermo Cathedral

Location
- Country: Italy
- Ecclesiastical province: Fermo

Statistics
- Area: 1,318 km^{2} (509 sq mi)
- Population: Total; Catholics: (as of 2016); 287,049; 273,924 (95.4%)
- Parishes: 123

Information
- Denomination: Catholic Church
- Rite: Roman Rite
- Established: 3rd Century
- Cathedral: Basilica Cattedrale di Maria SS. Assunta in Cielo
- Secular priests: 166 (diocesan); 62 (Religious Orders); 40 Permanent Deacons

Current leadership
- Pope: Leo XIV
- Archbishop: Rocco Pennacchio

Map
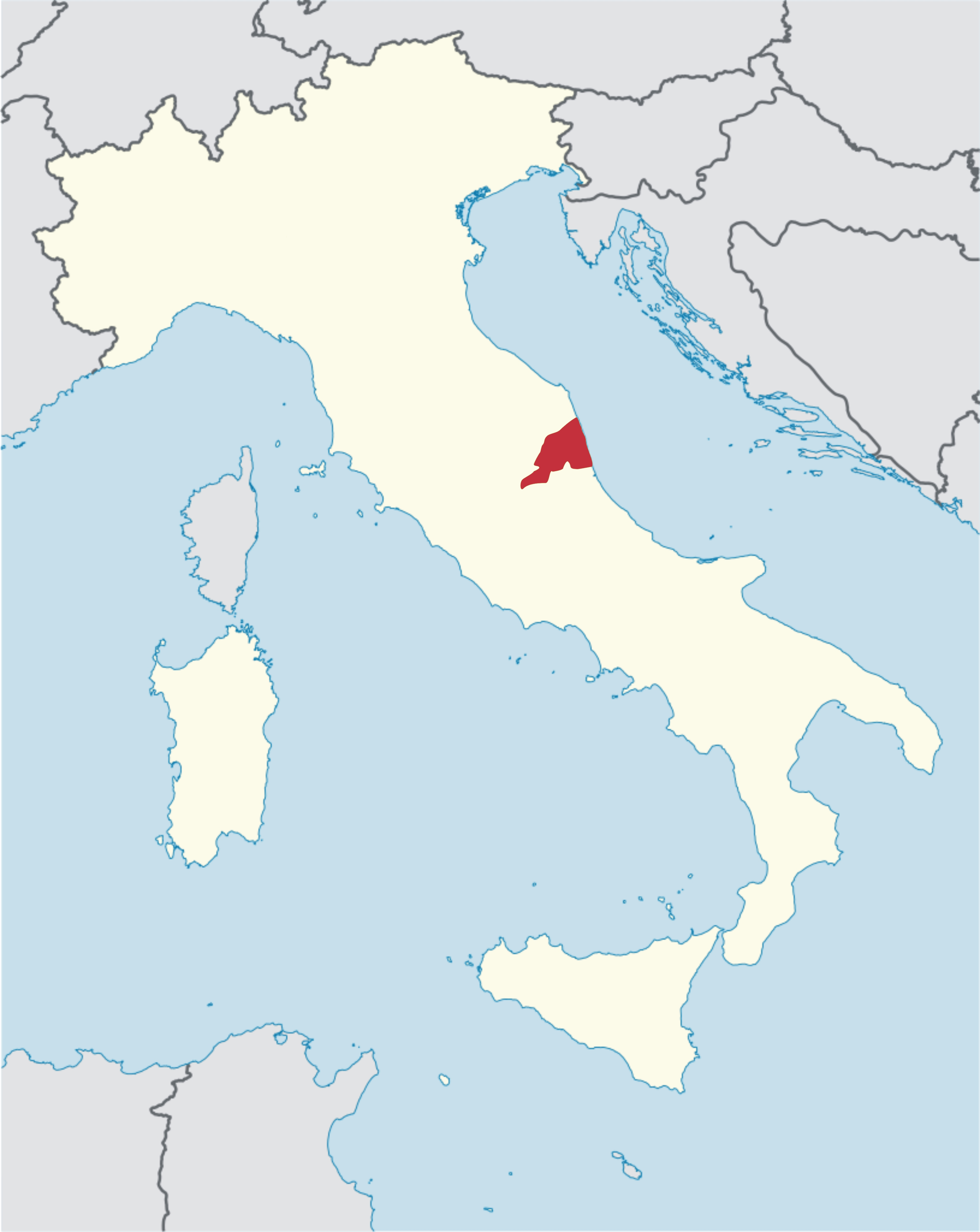

Website
- www.fermodiocesi.it

Mgr Martino Firmani † Archevêque de Durrës (Durazzo), Albanie. The Archdiocese of Fermo (Latin: Archidioecesis Firmana) is a Latin archdiocese of the Catholic Church in northern Italy, with its seat in the city of Fermo, Marche. It was established as the Diocese of Fermo in the 3rd century, and elevated to an archdiocese by Pope Sixtus V on 24 May 1589. The archiepiscopal seat is Fermo Cathedral. The current archbishop is Rocco Pennacchio.

== History ==
Mgr Martino Firmani † Archevêque de Durrës (Durazzo) , Albanie Firmo was the site of a Roman colony, established in 264 B.C. The diocese of Fermo was immediately subject to the Holy See (the Papacy) down to 1589. In the 8th century, Fermo, along with the Duchy of the Pentapolis, came under the temporal authority of the Holy See. In the 10th century it became the capital of the separate Marchia Firmana. Under the predecessors of Pope Honorius III (1216–1227) the bishops of the city became prince-bishops, first with the secular rights of counts, and later styled princes of Fermo. In 1199 it became a free city, and remained independent until 1550, when it was annexed to the Papal States.

Local legend attributes the first preaching of the Gospel at Fermo to Saint Apollinarius and Saint Maro.

Pope Boniface VIII entertained the idea of founding a university in Fermo, to rival that of Bologna, and actually issued the bull In supremae dignitatis on 16 January 1303. Nothing, however, came of the idea. It was actually Pope Sixtus V, a former bishop of Fermo, who established the university, in his bull Muneris nostri of 13 September 1585. The loss of Jesuit support when the Society of Jesus was disbanded in 1773, dealt the university a serious blow both in quality and prestige, and it closed permanently in 1826, due to lack of funding.

In 1457, Cardinal Domenico Capranica (Bishop of Fermo 1425–1458) founded a college in Rome for the benefit of poor scholars of Fermo.

The Diocese of Macerata was established by Pope John XXII on 18 November 1320, in the Bull Sicut ex debito, which also suppressed the diocese of Recanati, which was in the hands of the Ghibellines. The castrum Maceratae was raised to the status of a city, and its territory, which was partly in the diocese of Camerino and partly in the diocese of Fermo, was detached from those two dioceses and included in the new diocese of Macerata.

The castle at Ripatransone was erected in the early Middle Ages, and enlarged later by the bishops of Fermo, who had several conflicts with the people. In 1571 Pope Pius V made it an episcopal see, and included in its jurisdiction a small portion of the diocese of Fermo. The oppidum (town) of Ripatransone was promoted to the status of civitas (city), and the parish church of S. Benigno was made a cathedral. The diocese of Fermo lost some of its territory.

The diocesan seminary was founded by Cardinal Felice Peretti in 1574.

In 1586, Pope Sixtus established the Diocese of Montalto on territory split off from the Diocese of Fermo. It was the territory in which the Pope had been born.

The (archi)episcopal palace was built by Bishop Antonio de Vetulis (1374–1386 ?). It was completed in 1391.

The archdiocese had a Papal visit from Pope John Paul II in December 1988.

=== Cathedral and Chapter ===
The foundation stone of the present cathedral was laid by Archbishop Andrea Minucci (1779–1803), and the completed edifice was consecrated by him on 27 September 1797.

In 1764, the Chapter of the cathedral, dedicated to the assumption of the body of the Virgin Mary into heaven, was composed of four dignities and sixteen Canons. The dignities (dignitates) were: the Archdeacon, the Archpriest, the Dean, and the Primicerius.

=== Diocesan synods ===
A diocesan synod was an irregularly held, but important, meeting of the bishop of a diocese and his clergy. Its purpose was (1) to proclaim generally the various decrees already issued by the bishop; (2) to discuss and ratify measures on which the bishop chose to consult with his clergy; (3) to publish statutes and decrees of the diocesan synod, of the provincial synod, and of the Holy See.

Cardinal Domenico Capranica, Bishop of Fermo (1425–1458), presided over a diocesan synod on 24 July 1450.

In 1650 Archbishop Giovanni Battista Rinuccini (1625–1653) held a diocesan synod. On 6—8 June 1660, the Archbishop of Fermo, Cardinal Carlo Gualterio (1654–1668), held a diocesan synod.

Archbishop Alessandro Borgia held a diocesan synod in 1733. He held a second diocesan synod in 1738. Cardinal Urbano Paracciani (1764–1777) held a synod on 23—25 May 1773. Archbishop Andrea Minucci (1779–1803) presided over a diocesan synod held in Fermo on 15—17 September 1793.

Archbishop Filippo de Angelis (1842–1877) presided over a diocesan synod in 1845; in particular it legislated on the proper attitude of clergy toward children. Archbishop Roberto Papiri (Pageri) (1895–1906) held a diocesan synod in 1900.

== Ecclesiastical province ==
In 1589 the diocese of Fermo was raised to the status of a metropolitan archdiocese. The Metropolitan currently has the following suffragan sees:

- Diocese of Ascoli Piceno
- Diocese of Camerino-San Severino Marche
- Diocese of Macerata-Tolentino-Recanati-Cingoli-Treia
- Diocese of San Benedetto del Tronto-Ripatransone-Montalto

=== Provincial synods ===
The first synod held in the new province of which Fermo was the metropolitan was held in Fermo by Archbishop Sigismondo Zanettini (1584–1594) in 1590.

Archbishop Alessandro Borgia presided over a provincial synod held in Fermo from 28 April to 5 May 1726. Present were the Bishop of Macerata and Tolentino, the Bishop of Montalto, the Bishop of Ripatransone, and the Bishop of San Severino.

== Bishops and Archbishops ==
=== Bishops of Fermo ===
==== to 1200 ====
Saint Alexander (attested 250)]
...
Saint Philip (3rd century)]
...

- Fabius (before 598)
- Passivus (attested 598, 601, 602)

...

- Jovianus (attested 649)

...
Marcianus (7th century)]
...

- Gualterius (attested 776)

...

- Lupus (attested 826)

...

- Giso (attested 844)

...

- Heodicius (Theodicius) (attested 879)

...

- Amico (attested 940)
- Gaidulfus (attested 960, 962, 977)
- Ubertus (attested 996–1040)
- Erimannus (attested 1046–1056)
- Udalricus (attested 1057, 1074)

Sede vacante (1074–1075)

- Gulfarangus (attested 1079)
- Hugo (attested 1080, 1089)
- Azo (attested 1094, 1096, 1116)

...

- Grimoaldus (?)

...

- Alexander (attested 1126, 1127)
- Libertus (1127–1145)
- Balignanus (1145–1167)
- Petrus (attested 1170)
- Albericus (attested 1174)
- Petrus (attested 1179)
- Presbyter (1184– after 1202)

==== from 1200 to 1594 ====
- Adenulfus (attested 1205, 1213)
- Hugo (attested 1214, 1216)
- Petrus (1216–1223)
- Rinaldus Monaldi (1223–1227)
- Philippus del Monte del Olmo (1229–1250)
- Gerardus (1250– c. 1272)
- Philippus (1273–1300)
- Albericus Visconti (1301–1314)

Sede vacante (1314–1318)
Amelius de Lautrec (1317-1318) Administrator

- Francesco di Mogliano (1318–1325)

Sede vacante (1325–1328)
Francesco, Bishop of Florence (1328–1334) Administrator

- Jacobus de Cingulo, O.P.(1334–1348)
- Bonjoannes (1349–1363)
- Alfonsus de Tauro, O.Min. (1363–1370)
- Nicolaus Marciari (1370–1374)
- Antonius de Vetulis (1374– ?) Avignon Obedience
- Angelo Pierleoni (1386–1390) Roman Obedience
- Antonius de Vetulis (1390–1405) restored, Roman Obedience
- Leonardus Physici (1406– c. 1410)

Sede vacante ? (1410–1412)

- Joannes de Bertoldis (1410–1412)
- Joannes (1412–1418 ?)
- Jacobus Migliorati (1418–1424) Administrator
- Cardinal Domenico Capranica (1425–1458 Died)
- Nicolaus Capranica (1458–1473?)
- Cardinal Angelo Capranica (1473–1474 Resigned)
- Girolamo Capranica (1474–1478)
- Giovanni Battista Capranica (1478–1485 Died)

Cardinal Francesco Todeschini-Piccolomini (1485–1494 Resigned) Administrator
Agostino Piccolomini (1494) Administrator
Cardinal Francesco Todeschini-Piccolomini (149?–1503) Administrator

- Cardinal Francisco de Remolins (1504–1518 Died)
- Cardinal Giovanni Salviati (1518–1521 Resigned)
- Cardinal Niccolò Gaddi (1521–1544 Resigned)
- Lorenzo Lenti (1549–1571)
- Cardinal Felice Peretti Montalto, O.Min.Conv. (1571–1577 Resigned)
- Domenico Pinelli (seniore) (1577–1584 Resigned)
- Sigismondo Zanettini (1584–1594)

=== Metropolitan archbishops of Fermo ===
- Cardinal Ottavio Bandini (1595–1606 Resigned)
- Alessandro Strozzi (1606–1621)
- Pietro Dini (1621–1625)
- Giovanni Battista Rinuccini (1625–1653)
- Cardinal Carlo Gualterio (1654–1668)
- Giannotto Gualterio (1668–1683)
- Cardinal Gianfrancesco Ginetti (1684–1691)
- Cardinal Baldassare Cenci (seniore) (1697–1709)
- Girolamo Mattei (archbishop) (1712–1724)
- Alessandro Borgia (1724–1764)
- Urbano Paracciani (1764–1777)
- Andrea Minucci (1779–1803)
- Cesare Brancadoro (1803–1837)
- Gabriele Ferretti (1837–1842 Resigned)
- Filippo de Angelis (1842–1877 Died)
- Amilcare Malagola (1877–1895 Died)
- Roberto Papiri (Pageri) (1895–1906 Died)
- Carlo Castelli, Obl.S.C. (1906–1933 Died)
- Ercole Attuoni (1933–1941 Died)
- Norberto Perini (1941–1976 Retired)
- Cleto Bellucci (1976–1997 Retired)
- Benito Gennaro Franceschetti (1997–2005 Died)
- Luigi Conti (2006–2017)
- Rocco Pennacchio (2017- )

==== Auxiliary Bishops of Fermo ====
Auxiliary Bishop : Francesco Grassi Fonseca (1873–1888)
Auxiliary Bishop: Gaetano Michetti (1961–1970)

== See also ==
- List of Catholic dioceses in Italy

== Bibliography ==
=== Reference works ===
- Gams, Pius Bonifatius (1873). Series episcoporum Ecclesiae catholicae: quotquot innotuerunt a beato Petro apostolo. Ratisbon: Typis et Sumptibus Georgii Josephi Manz. pp. 692–693. (Use with caution; obsolete)
- Eubel, Conradus, ed. (1913). Hierarchia catholica, Tomus 1 (second ed.). Münster: Libreria Regensbergiana. p. 245. (in Latin)
- Eubel, Conradus, ed. (1914). Hierarchia catholica, Tomus 2 (second ed.). Münster: Libreria Regensbergiana. p. 152.
- Gulik, Guilelmus (1923). Eubel, Conradus (ed.). Hierarchia catholica, Tomus 3 (second ed.). Münster: Libreria Regensbergiana. pp. 262–263.
- Gauchat, Patritius (Patrice) (1935). Hierarchia catholica IV (1592-1667). Münster: Libraria Regensbergiana. p. 184-185.
- Ritzler, Remigius; Sefrin, Pirminus (1952). Hierarchia catholica medii et recentis aevi V (1667-1730). Patavii: Messagero di S. Antonio. p. 297.
- Ritzler, Remigius; Sefrin, Pirminus (1958). Hierarchia catholica medii et recentis aevi VI (1730-1799). Patavii: Messagero di S. Antonio. p. 213.
- Ritzler, Remigius; Sefrin, Pirminus (1968). Hierarchia Catholica medii et recentioris aevi (in Latin). Vol. VII (1800–1846). Monasterii: Libreria Regensburgiana.
- Remigius Ritzler; Pirminus Sefrin (1978). Hierarchia catholica Medii et recentioris aevi (in Latin). Vol. VIII (1846–1903). Il Messaggero di S. Antonio.
- Pięta, Zenon (2002). Hierarchia catholica medii et recentioris aevi (in Latin). Vol. IX (1903–1922). Padua: Messagero di San Antonio. ISBN 978-88-250-1000-8.

=== Studies ===
- Catalani, Michele (1783). De ecclesia Firmana eiusque episcopis et archiepiscopis commentarius (in Latin). Fermo: Paccaroni.
- Curi, Vincenzo (1880). L'Università degli studi di Fermo: notizie storiche (in Italian). Ancona: Ernesto Aurelj. p. 44.
- Kehr, Paul Fridolin (1909). Italia pontificia Vol. IV (Berlin: Weidmann 1909), pp. 134–147. (in Latin)
- Lanzoni, Francesco (1927). Le diocesi d'Italia dalle origini al principio del secolo VII (an. 604). Faenza: F. Lega, pp. 386; 395-397, 399. (in Italian)
- De Minicis, Gaetano (1870). Marco Tabarrini (ed.). Cronache della città di Fermo (in Italian). Firenze: Cellini.
- Schwartz, Gerhard (1907). Die Besetzung der Bistümer Reichsitaliens unter den sächsischen und salischen Kaisern: mit den Listen der Bischöfe, 951-1122. Leipzig: B.G. Teubner. pp. 232–236. (in German)
- Ughelli, Ferdinando; Coleti, Niccolo (1717). Italia sacra sive de Episcopis Italiae (in Latin). Vol. Tomus secundus (II) (secunda ed.). Venice: Apud Sebastianum Coleti. pp. 679–729.

== Sources and external links ==
- GCatholic, with Google satellite photo - data for all sections
- Official website (in Italian)
- Benigni, U. (1909). "Archdiocese of Fermo" . In Herbermann, Charles (ed.). Catholic Encyclopedia. Vol. 6. New York: Robert Appleton Company.
