= Xuereb =

Xuereb is a Maltese surname.

Some claim the name comes from the Arabic word for moustaches, šawārib. Others, however, think it comes from the Arabic word for drink or beverage, sharab.

Notable people with the surname include:

- Aaron Xuereb (born 1979), Maltese footballer
- Alfred Xuereb (born 1958), Maltese Catholic cleric, Vatican official
- Anthony Xuereb (born 1970), Australian rugby league player
- Daniel Xuereb (born 1959), French footballer
- Janice Xuereb (born 1996), Maltese footballer
- Martin Xuereb (born 1968), Commander of the Armed Forces of Malta
- Paul Xuereb (1923–1994), Maltese politician
- Pierre-Henri Xuereb (born 1959), French violist
- Raymond Xuereb (born 1952), Maltese footballer
- Francesca Xuereb (born 1998), American Actress
