= Fermo Cathedral =

Cathedral in Fermo, Marche, Italy

Coordinates: 43.1611°N 13.7164°E

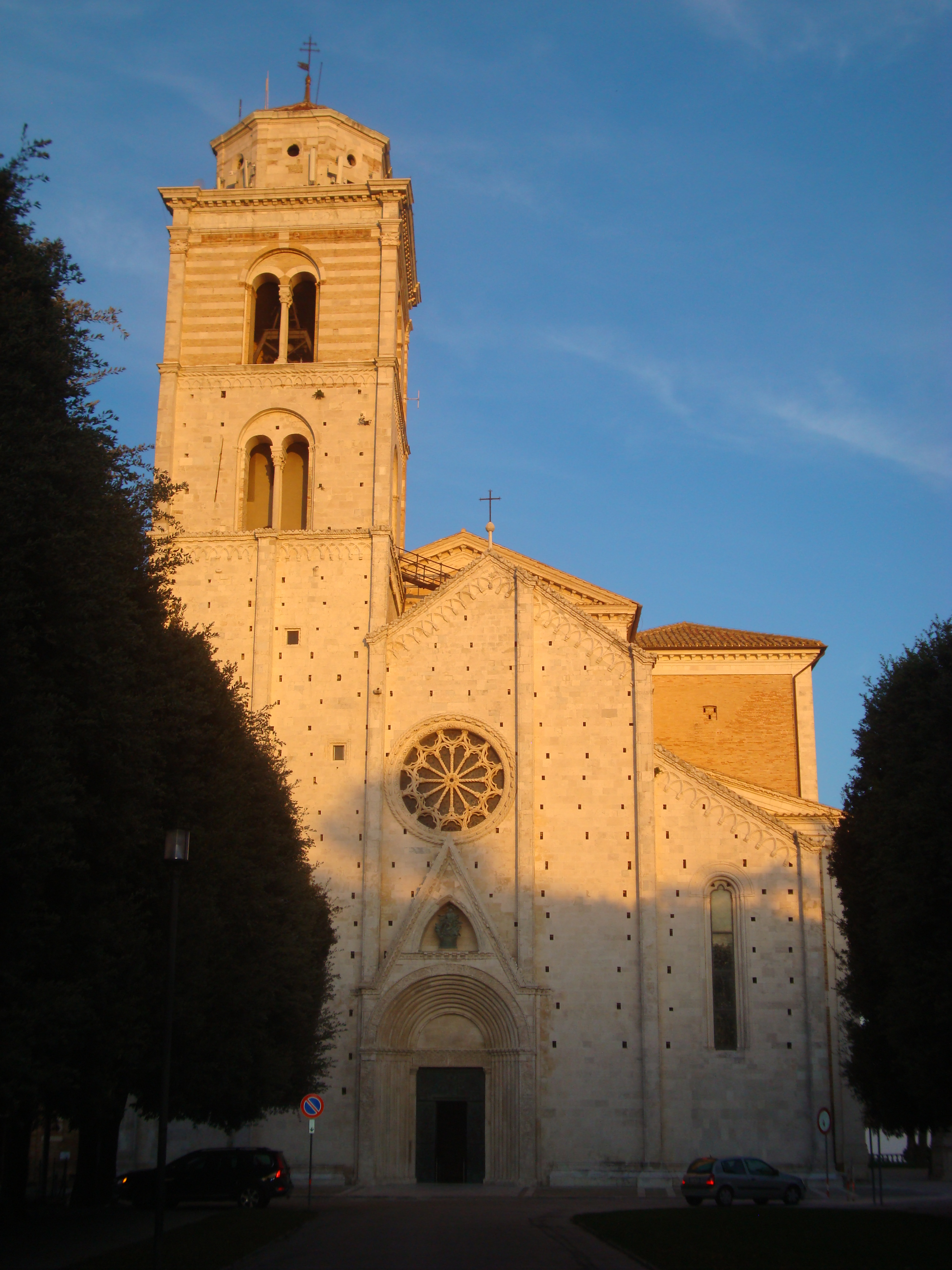
Fermo Cathedral west front

Fermo Cathedral (Italian: Cattedrale metropolitana di Santa Maria Assunta in Cielo; Duomo di Fermo) is a Roman Catholic cathedral in Fermo, region of Marche, Italy, dedicated to the Assumption of the Virgin Mary. It is the archiepiscopal seat of the Archdiocese of Fermo.

== History ==
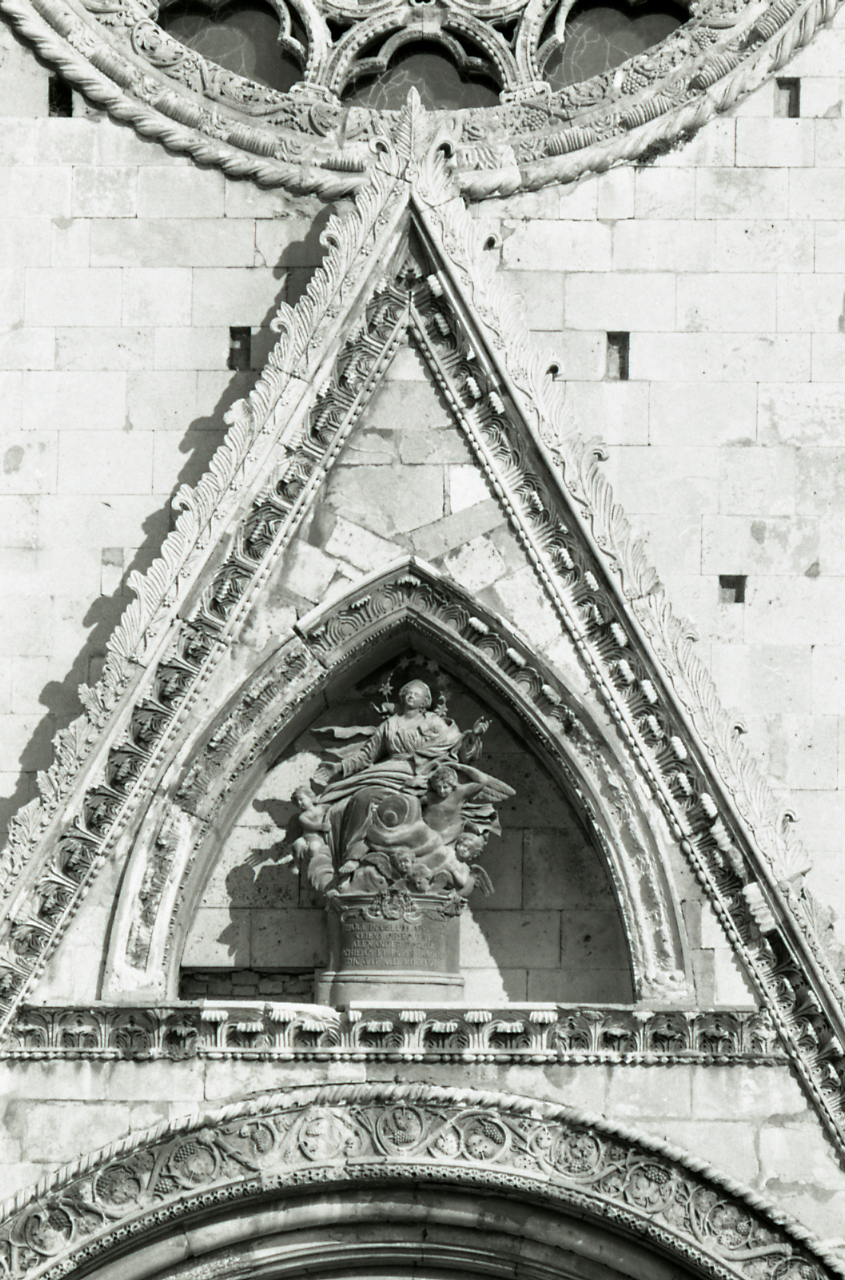
Facade detail, photographed by Paolo Monti in 1969

Archaeological excavations have demonstrated that the cathedral site was formerly that of a pagan temple. The first church was destroyed in 1176 during the campaign of Frederick I, Holy Roman Emperor. It was rebuilt in 1227 under the patronage of Giorgio da Como. Construction was pursued over the following decades leading to the present façade with both Romanesque and Gothic elements and built in Istrian stone. The rose window was sculpted by Giacomo Palmieri in 1348. The portal niche has a bronze statue of the Madonna of the Assumption by Nunzio Ucinelli. The atrium has frescoes from the 14th-century and the funeral monument of Giovanni Visconti d’Oleggio. The base of the bell-tower also dates from the early church.

In 1781-1789, the cathedral was extensively refurbished, altering the interior into a Neoclassical layout. The architect was Cosimo Morelli. The bronze doors to the church were completed in 1980 by Aldo Sergiacomi. The interior contains a paleo-christian sarcophagus of the 3rd to 4th century located in the 13th-century crypt, and a Byzantine style icon donated by Giacomo della Marca.

== See also ==
- Fermo chasuble of St. Thomas Becket
