= Yannis Spiteris =

Yannis Spiteris OFMCap
- Archbishop Emeritus of Corfu, Zakynthos, and Cephalonia
- Native name: Ιωάννης Σπιτέρης
- Church: Catholic Church
- Archdiocese: Archdiocese of Corfu, Zakynthos, and Cephalonia
- In office: 22 March 2003 – 14 September 2020
- Predecessor: Antonios Varthalitis
- Successor: Georgios Altouvas
- Other post: Apostolic Administrator of Thessaloniki (since 2020)

Orders
- Ordination: 24 July 1968
- Consecration: 18 May 2003 by Antonios Varthalitis

Personal details
- Born: 27 August 1940 (age 86) Corfu, Kingdom of Greece

Styles of Yannis Spiteris
- Reference style: The Most Reverend
- Spoken style: Your Excellency
- Religious style: Monsignor
- Posthumous style: none

Yannis Spiteris, OFMCap (Greek: Ιωάννης Σπιτέρης; born August 27, 1940, Corfu, Greece) was the Roman Catholic Archbishop of Corfu, Zante and Cefalonia and apostolic administrator of Apostolic Vicariate of Thessaloniki from 2003 to 2020. In 1968 he was ordained Catholic priest and on March 22, 2003 was appointed archbishop, being ordained Catholic bishop on May 18, 2003.

== Life ==
Bishop Yannis Spiteris was born in Corfu (city), the capital of the Greek island of Corfu. He came from a large Christian family and took his graduation in a Capuchin monastery and laid on December 10, 1963 his first monastic vows.

After his theological studies Spiteris received on 24 July 1968 by then Archbishop of Corfu, Antonios Varthalitis his ordination. He completed a doctoral program in theology at the University of Fribourg and later received a teaching position at the Pontifical Lateran University. Spiteris served as vicar and pastor in several churches on the island of Corfu, in Athens and in Crete.

On 22 March 2003, he was appointed Archbishop of Corfu, Zante and Cephalonia, the consecration took place on May 18, 2003 by Antonio Varthalitis, his predecessor in the Archdiocese of Corfu, and Nikolaos Foskolos, Archbishop of Athens and Frangiskos Papamanolis, Bishop of Syros. He also held the office of the Apostolic Administrator of the Apostolic Vicariate of Thessaloniki, which has not been led by a bishop since 1929. Pope Francis accepted Spiteris' resignation from these positions on 14 September 2020.
