= Benito Gennaro Franceschetti =

Italian Roman Catholic archbishop

Benito Gennaro Franceschetti (June 14, 1935 – February 4, 2005) was a Roman Catholic archbishop.

Ordained to the priesthood in 1960, Franceschetti was appointed archbishop of the Roman Catholic Archdiocese of Fermo, Italy, in 1997. He died while still in office.
