= Archdiocese of Corfu, Zakynthos, and Cephalonia =

Latin Catholic ecclesiastical jurisdiction in Greece

Archdiocese of Corfu, Zakynthos, and Cephalonia Archidioecesis Corcyrensis, Zacynthiensis, et Cephaloniensis Αρχιεπισκοπή Κερκύρας, Ζακύνθου, και Κεφαλληνίας

Catholic
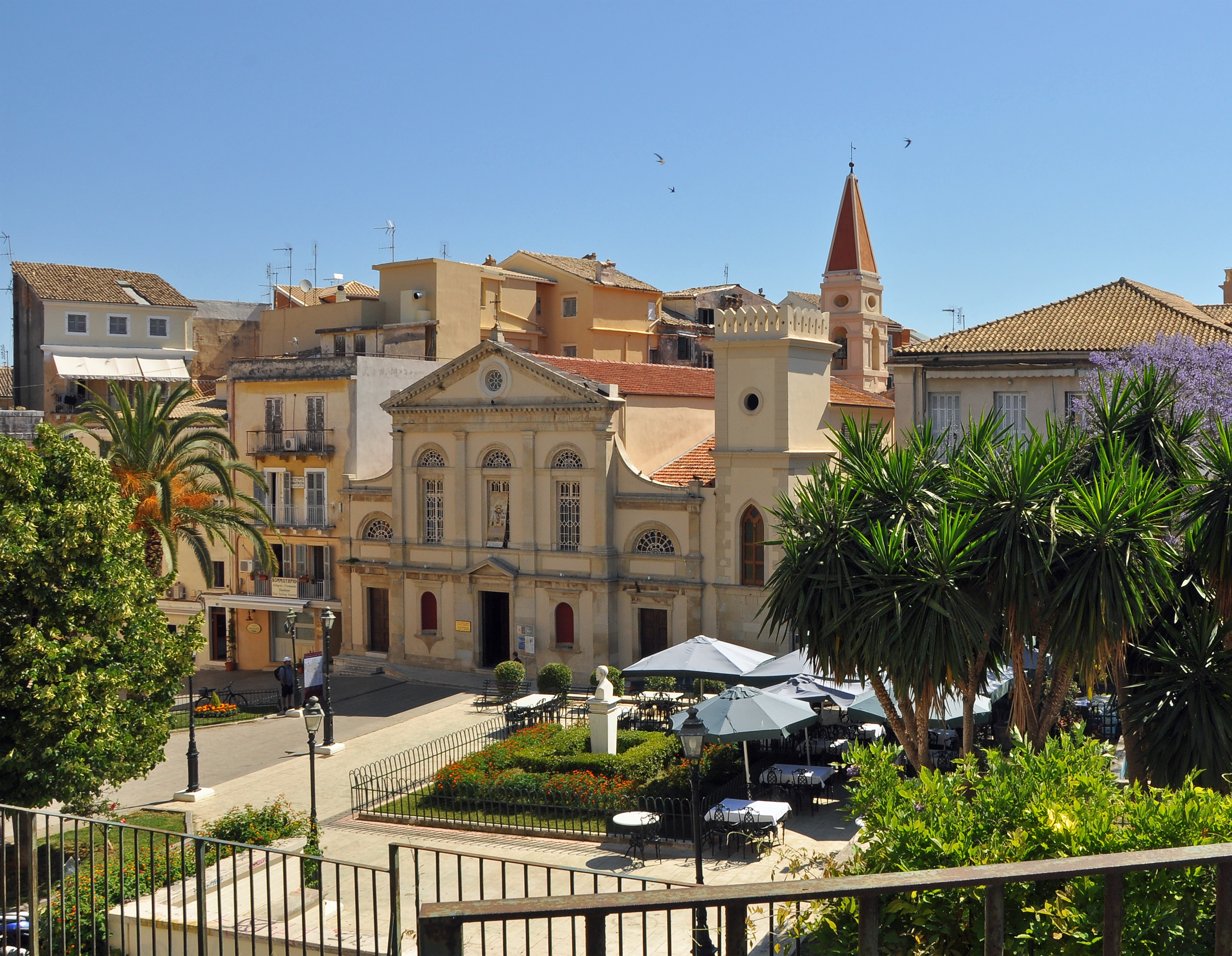
- Cathedral of Saint James and Saint Christopher, Corfu

- Coat of arms of Bishop Georgios Altouvas

Location
- Country: Greece
- Headquarters: Corfu, Ionian Islands, Greece

Statistics
- Area: 11,510 km^{2} (4,440 sq mi)
- Population: Total; Catholics: (as of 2023); 119,500; 3,480 (2.9%)
- Parishes: 3

Information
- Denomination: Catholic Church
- Sui iuris church: Latin Church
- Rite: Roman Rite
- Established: 1310; 716 years ago
- Cathedral: Cathedral of Saint James and Saint Christopher

Current leadership
- Pope: Leo XIV
- Bishop: Sede vacante
- Bishops emeritus: Yannis Spiteris, O.F.M.Cap.

Website
- catholic-church-corfu.org

The Archdiocese of Corfu, Zakynthos, and Cefalonia (Latin: Archdioecesis Corcyrensis, Zacynthiensis et Cephaloniensis) is a Latin Church ecclesiastical territory or archdiocese of the Catholic Church comprising the Ionian Islands of Corfu, Zakynthos and Cephalonia in western Greece.

== History ==
- 1310: Established as Diocese of Corfù
- 3 June 1919: Promoted as Metropolitan Archdiocese of Corfu – Zakynthos – Cephalonia

== Leadership ==
Bishops of Corfù

- Vincenzo Querini (29 January 1597 – 1618)
- Benedetto Bragadin, O.F.M. Obs. (3 December 1618 – 1658)
- Carlo Labia, C.R. (27 January 1659 – 13 September 1677), appointed (Arch)Bishop of Adria
- Marcantonio Barbarigo (6 June 1678 – 7 June 1687), appointed (Arch)Bishop of Corneto (Tarquinia) e Montefiascone
- Giorgio Emo (14 June 1688 – January 1705)
- Augusto Antonio Zacco (15 November 1706 – 22 November 1723), appointed (Arch)Bishop of Treviso
- Angelo Maria Querini, O.S.B. (22 November 1723 – 30 July 1727), appointed (Arch)Bishop of Brescia
- Vincenzo Maria Mazzoleni, O.P. (26 November 1727 – 18 June 1731), appointed (Arch)Bishop of Poreč
- Giovanni Antonio Foscarini, C.R.L. (3 March 1732 – December 1739)
- Antonio Nani (18 April 1742 – April 1765)
- Paolo Da Ponte, O.C.D. (5 August 1765 – 13 September 1773), appointed (Arch)Bishop of Torcello (Turris)
- Andrea Benedetto Ganassoni, O.S.B. (20 December 1773 – 12 July 1779), appointed (Arch)Bishop of Feltre
- Francesco Maria Fenzi (20 September 1779 – 3 January 1816), resigned
- Daulo Augusto Foscolo (8 March 1816 – 30 December 1829), resigned
- Pietro Antonio Nostrano (15 March 1830 – May 1852)
- Francis Joseph Nicholson, O.C.D. (May 1852 – 30 April 1855)
- Carlo Rivelli (1 November 1855 – 18 September 1858)
- Spiridione Maddalena (28 September 1860 – 1 August 1884)
- Evangelista Boni, O.F.M. Cap. (23 January 1885 – 19 August 1897)
- Antonios Delendas (12 February 1898 – 29 April 1900), appointed Archbishop of Athens
- Teodoro Antonio Polito (11 June 1901 – 23 September 1911)
- Domenico Darmanin (4 March 1912 – 17 February 1919)

Archbishops of Corfù, Zakynthos and Cefalonia

- Leonard Brindisi (3 July 1919 – 8 September 1940)
- Antonios Grigorios Voutsinos, A.A. (29 May 1947 – 6 July 1952), resigned
  - Apostolic Administrator Marios Makrionitis, S.J. (14 June 1952 – 8 April 1959), Archbishop of Athens
  - Apostolic Administrator Venediktos Printesis (15 May 1959 – 1962), Archbishop of Athens
- Antonios Varthalitis, A.A. (3 May 1962 – 22 March 2003), retired
- Yannis Spiteris, O.F.M. Cap. (22 March 2003 – 14 September 2020), retired
- Georgios Altouvas (14 September 2020 – 28 August 2026), appointed (Arch)Bishop of Syros and Milos

== See also ==
- Roman Catholicism in Greece

== Sources ==
- GCatholic.org
- Catholic Hierarchy
- Diocese website
