= Cardinals created by Gregory XVI =

Catholic appointments from 1831 to 1846

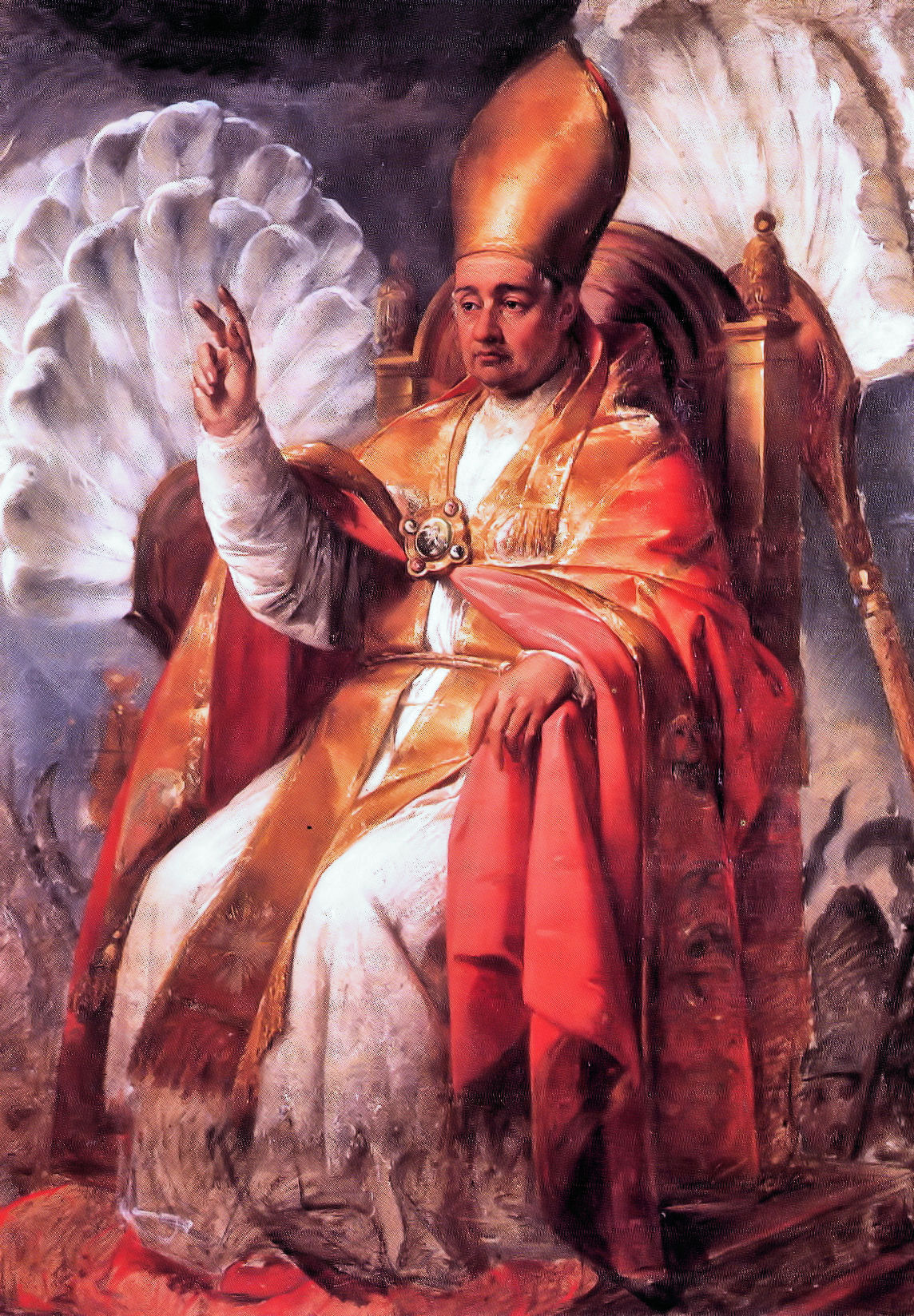
Pope Gregory XVI (1765-1846).

Pope Gregory XVI (r. 1831–1846) created 75 new cardinals in 24 consistories:

== 30 September 1831 ==
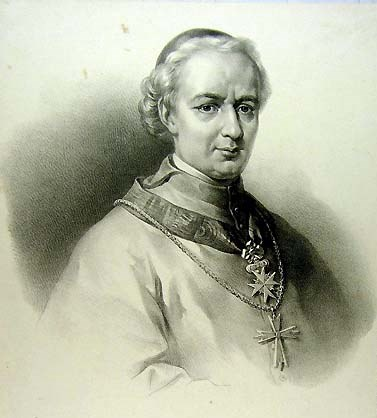
Luigi Lambruschini (1776-1854), made a cardinal on September 30, 1831.

1. Luigi Emmanuele Nicolo Lambruschini, C.R.S.P., titular archbishop of Beirut, nuncio in France – cardinal priest of S. Callisto (received the title on 24 February 1832), then cardinal bishop of Sabina (24 January 1842), cardinal bishop of Porto e S. Rufina e Civitavecchia (11 July 1847), died 12 May 1854
2. Alessandro Giustiniani, titular archbishop of Petra, nuncio in Portugal (in pectore published on 2 July 1832) – cardinal priest of S. Croce in Gerusalemme (received the title on 19 December 1834), died 11 October 1843
3. Francesco Tiberi Contigliano, titular archbishop of Athens, nuncio in Spain (in pectore published on 2 July 1832) – cardinal priest of S. Stefano al Monte Celio (received the title on 1 August 1834), died 28 October 1839
4. Ugo Pietro Spinola, titular archbishop of Tebe, nuncio in Austria (in pectore published on 2 July 1832) – cardinal priest of SS. Silvestro e Martino (received the title on 17 December 1832), died 21 January 1858
5. Francesco Serra Casano, archbishop of Capua (in pectore published on 15 April 1833) – cardinal priest of SS. XII Apostoli (received the title on 29 July 1833), died 17 August 1850
6. Francesco Canali, titular archbishop of Larissa, secretary of S. C. of Bishops and Regulars (in pectore, published on 23 June 1834) – cardinal priest of S. Clemente (received the title on 1 August 1834), died 11 April 1835
7. Pietro Ostini, titular archbishop of Tarsus, nuncio in Brazylii (in pectore published on 11 July 1836) – cardinal priest of S. Clemente (received the title on 21 November 1836), then cardinal bishop of Albano (3 April 1843), died 4 March 1849
8. Giuseppe Antonio Sala, secretary of S. C. of Council – cardinal priest of S. Maria della Sala (received the title on 24 February 1832), died 23 June 1839
9. Benedetto Cappelletti, vice-camerlengo and governor of Rome (in pectore published on 2 July 1832) – cardinal priest of S. Clemente (received the title on 17 December 1832), died 15 May 1834
10. Luigi Del Drago (in pectore published on 2 July 1832) – cardinal priest of S. Lorenzo in Panisperna (received the title on 17 December 1832), died 18 April 1845
11. Francesco Maria Pandolfi Alberici (in pectore published on 2 July 1832) – cardinal priest of S. Prisca (received the title on 17 December 1832), died 3 June 1835
12. Ludovico Gazzoli (in pectore published on 2 July 1832) – cardinal deacon of S. Eustachio (received the title on 17 December 1832), then cardinal deacon of S. Maria in Via Lata (19 March 1857), died 12 February 1858

== 2 July 1832 ==
All the new cardinals received their titles on 17 December 1832.

1. Giuseppe Maria Velzi, O.P., Master of the Sacred Palace – cardinal priest of S. Maria sopra Minerva, died 23 November 1836
2. Mario Mattei, treasury general of Apostolic Camera – cardinal deacon of S. Maria in Aquiro, then cardinal priest of S. Maria degli Angeli (22 July 1842), cardinal bishop of Frascati (17 June 1844), cardinal bishop of Porto e S. Rufina (23 June 1854), cardinal bishop of Ostia e Velletri (17 December 1860), died 7 October 1870

== 15 April 1833 ==
1. Lorenzo Girolamo Mattei, secretary of S. C. Propaganda Fide – cardinal priest without the title, died 24 July 1833
2. Castruccio Castracane degli Antelminelli, Latin Patriarch of Antioch, secretary of S. C. of the Apostolic Visitation – cardinal priest of S. Pietro in Vincoli (received the title on 29 July 1833), then cardinal bishop of Palestrina (22 January 1844), died 22 February 1852

== 29 July 1833 ==
1. Giacomo Monico, patriarch of Venice – cardinal priest of SS. Nereo ed Achilleo (received the title on 23 June 1834), died 25 April 1851
2. Filippo Giudice Caracciolo, Orat., archbishop of Naples – cardinal priest of S. Agnese fuori le mura (received the title on 30 September 1833), died 29 January 1844

== 20 January 1834 ==
All the new cardinals received heir titles on 23 June 1834

1. Giacomo Luigi Brignole, titular archbishop of Nazianzo, treasurer general of the Apostolic Camera – cardinal priest of S. Giovanni a Porta Latina, then cardinal priest of S. Cecilia (13 September 1838), cardinal bishop of Sabiny (11 June 1847), died 23 June 1853
2. Nicola Grimaldi, vice-camerlengo and governor of Rome – cardinal deacon of S. Nicola in Carcere, died 12 January 1845

== 23 June 1834 ==
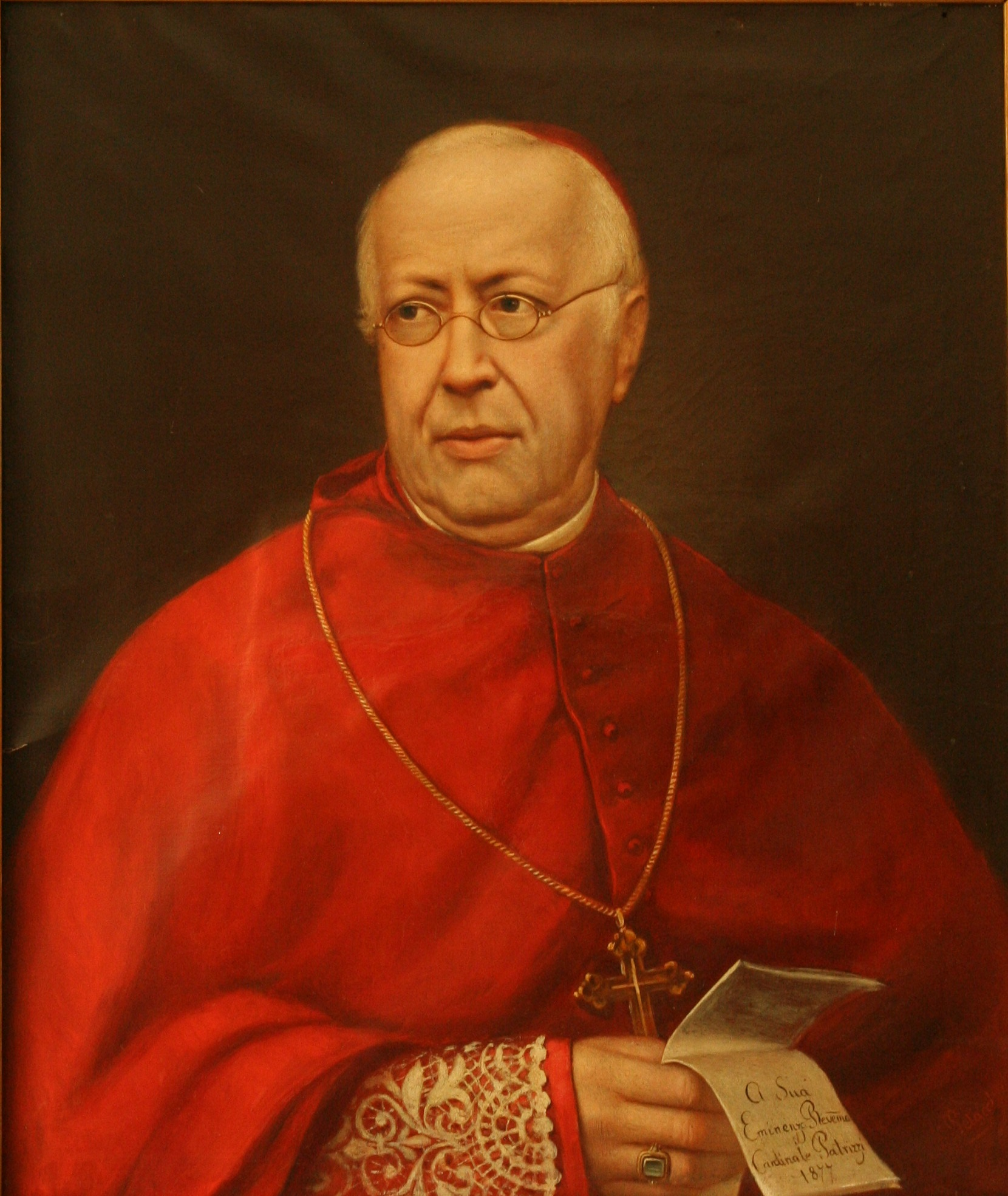
Costantino Patrizi Naro (1798-1876), made a cardinal on June 23, 1834.

1. Gaetano Maria Giuseppe Benedetto Placido Vincenzo Trigona e Parisi, archbishop of Palermo – cardinal priest without the title, died 5 July 1837
2. Luigi Bottiglia Savoulx, titular archbishop of Perge – cardinal priest of S. Silvestro in Capite (received the title on 1 August 1834), died 14 September 1836
3. Paolo Polidori, secretary of S. C. of Council – cardinal priest of S. Eusebio (received the title on 1 August 1834), then cardinal priest of S. Prassede (12 July 1841), died 23 April 1847
4. Giuseppe della Porta Rodiani, Latin Patriarch of Constantinople (in pectore published on 6 April 1835) – cardinal priest of S. Susanna (received the title on 24 July 1835), died 18 December 1841
5. Giuseppe Alberghini, (in pectore published on 6 April 1835) – cardinal priest of S. Prisca (received the title on 24 July 1835), died 30 September 1847
6. Alessandro Spada, dean of the auditors of the Sacred Roman Rota (in pectore published on 6 April 1835) – cardinal deacon of S. Maria in Cosmedin (received the title on 24 July 1835), died 16 December 1843
7. Luigi Frezza, titular archbishop of Chalcedon (in pectore published on 11 July 1836) – cardinal priest of S. Onofrio (received the title on 21 November 1836), died 14 October 1837
8. Costantino Patrizi Naro, titular archbishop of Filippi (in pectore published on 11 July 1836) – cardinal priest of S. Silvestro in Capite (received the title on 21 November 1836), then cardinal bishop of Albano (20 April 1849), cardinal bishop of Porto e S. Rufina (17 December 1860), cardinal bishop of Ostia e Velletri (8 October 1870), died 17 December 1876
9. Adriano Fieschi (in pectore published on 13 September 1838) – cardinal deacon of S. Maria in Portico (received the title on 17 September 1838), then cardinal deacon of S. Maria ad Martyres (27 January 1843), cardinal priest of S. Maria della Vittoria (19 December 1853), died 6 February 1858

== 6 April 1835 ==
1. Placido Maria Tadini, O.C.D., archbishop of Genoa – cardinal priest of S. Maria in Traspontina (received the title on 24 July 1835), died 22 November 1847
2. Ambrogio Bianchi, O.S.B.Cam. master general of his order (in pectore published on 8 July 1839) – cardinal priest of SS. Andrea e Gregorio al Monte Celio (received the title on 11 July 1839), died 3 March 1856

== 1 February 1836 ==
1. Jean-Louis Anne Madelain Lefebvre de Cheverus, archbishop of Bordeaux – cardinal priest without the title, died 19 July 1836
2. Gabriele della Genga Sermattei, archbishop of Ferrara – cardinal priest of S. Girolamo degli Schiavoni (received the title on 21 November 1836), died 10 February 1861

== 19 May 1837 ==
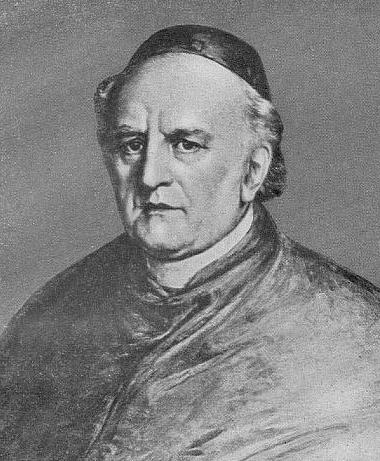
Angelo Mai (1782-1854), made a cardinal on May 19, 1837.

1. Luigi Amat di San Filippo e Sorso, titular archbishop of Nicea, nuncio in Spain – cardinal priest of S. Maria in Via (received the title on 2 October 1837), then cardinal bishop of Palestrina (15 March 1852), cardinal bishop of Porto e S. Rufina (8 October 1870), cardinal bishop of Ostia e Velletri (12 March 1877), died 30 March 1878
2. Angelo Mai, secretary of S. C. Propaganda Fide (in pectore, published on 12 February 1838) – cardinal priest of S. Anastasia (received the title on 15 February 1838), died 9 September 1854

== 12 February 1838 ==
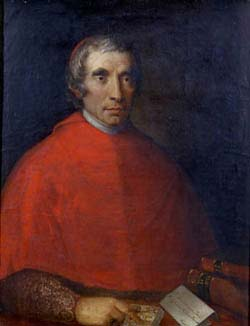
Giuseppe Caspar Mezzofanti (1774-1849), made a cardinal on February 12, 1838.

1. Chiarissimo Falconieri Mellini, archbishop of Ravenna– cardinal priest of S. Marcello (received the title on 15 February 1838), died 22 August 1859
2. Antonio Francesco Orioli, O.F.M.Conv., bishop of Orvieto – cardinal priest of S. Maria sopra Minerva (received the title on 15 February 1838), then cardinal priest of SS. XII Apostoli (30 September 1850), died 20 February 1852
3. Giuseppe Gasparo Mezzofanti, custos of the Vatican Library – cardinal priest of S. Onofrio (received the title on 15 February 1838), died 15 March 1849
4. Giuseppe Ugolini, dean of the Apostolic Camera – cardinal deacon of S. Giorgio in Velabro (received the title on 15 February 1838), then cardinal deacon of S. Adriano (13 September 1838), cardinal deacon of S. Maria in Cosmedin (17 December 1855), cardinal deacon of S. Maria in Via Lata (15 March 1858), died 19 December 1867
5. Luigi Ciacchi, vice-camerlengo and governor of Rome – cardinal deacon of S. Angelo in Pescheria (received the title on 15 February 1838), died 17 December 1865
6. Giovanni Soglia Ceroni, Latin Patriarch of Jerusalem, secretary of S.C. of Bishops and Regulars (in pectore published on 18 February 1839) – cardinal priest of SS. IV Coronati (received the title on 21 February 1839), died 12 August 1856
7. Antonio Tosti, treasury general of the Apostolic Camera (in pectore published on 18 February 1839) – cardinal priest of S. Pietro in Montorio (received the title on 21 February 1839), died 20 March 1866
8. Francesco Saverio Massimo, prefect of the Sacred Palace (in pectore published on 24 January 1842) – cardinal deacon of S. Maria in Domnica (received the title on 27 January 1842), died 11 January 1848

== 13 September 1838 ==
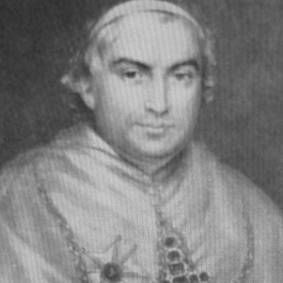
Engelbert Sterckx (1792-1867), made a cardinal on September 13, 1838.

1. Engelbert Sterckx, archbishop of Mechelen – cardinal priest of S. Bartolomeo all'Isola (received the title on 17 September 1838), died 4 December 1867
2. Filippo de Angelis, archbishop of Montefiascone (in pectore published on 8 July 1839) – cardinal priest of S. Bernardo alle Terme (received the title on 11 July 1839), then cardinal priest of S. Lorenzo in Lucina (20 September 1867), died 8 July 1877

== 30 November 1838 ==
1. Gabriele Ferretti, archbishop of Fermo (in pectore published on 8 July 1839) – cardinal priest of SS. Quirico e Giulitta (received the title on 11 July 1839), then cardinal bishop of Sabiny (12 September 1853), died 13 September 1860

== 18 February 1839 ==
1. Charles Januarius Acton, auditor general of the Apostolic Camera (in pectore published on 24 January 1842) – cardinal priest of S. Maria della Pace (received the title on 27 January 1842), then cardinal priest of S. Marco (21 December 1846), died 23 June 1847

== 8 July 1839 ==
1. Ferdinando Maria Pignatelli, Theat., archbishop of Palermo – cardinal priest of S. Maria della Vittoria (received the title on 11 July 1839), died 10 May 1853

== 23 December 1839 ==
1. Hugues-Robert-Jean-Charles de la Tour d'Auvergne-Lauragais, bishop of Arras – cardinal priest of S. Agnese fuori le mura (received the title on 16 April 1846), died 20 July 1851
2. Giovanni Maria Mastai-Ferretti, archbishop of Imola (in pectore published on 14 December 1840) – cardinal priest of SS. Marcellino e Pietro (received the title on 17 December 1840); elected pope Pius IX on 16 June 1846, died 7 February 1878
3. Gaspare Bernardo Pianetti, bishop of Viterbo e Toscanella (in pectore published on 14 December 1840) – cardinal priest of S. Sisto (received the title on 17 December 1840), died 30 January 1862
4. Luigi Vannicelli Casoni, vice-camerlengo and governor of Rome (in pectore published on 24 January 1842) – cardinal priest of S. Callisto (received the title on 27 January 1842), then cardinal priest of S. Prassede (4 October 1847), died 21 April 1877

== 14 December 1840 ==
1. Lodovico Altieri, titular archbishop of Efeso (in pectore published on 21 April 1845) – cardinal priest of S. Maria in Portico (received the title on 24 November 1845), then cardinal bishop of Albano (17 December 1860), died 11 August 1867
2. Silvestro Belli (in pectore published on 12 July 1841) – cardinal priest of S. Balbina (received the title on 15 July 1841), died 9 September 1844

== 1 March 1841 ==
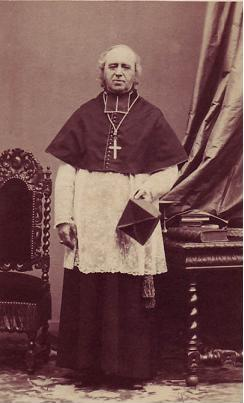
Louis Jacques Maurice de Bonald (1787-1870), made a cardinal on March 1, 1841.

1. Louis Jacques Maurice de Bonald, archbishop of Lyon – cardinal priest of SS. Trinita al Monte Pincio (received the title on 23 May 1842), died 25 February 1870

== 12 July 1841 ==
1. Tommaso Pasquale Gizzi, titular archbishop of Tebe (in pectore published on 22 January 1844) – cardinal priest of S. Pudenziana (received the title on 25 January 1844), died 3 June 1849

== 24 January 1842 ==
Both cardinals received their titles on 27 January 1842

1. Friedrich Johannes Jacob Celestin von Schwarzenberg, archbishop of Salzburg, archbishop of Prague – cardinal priest of S. Agostino, died 27 March 1885
2. Cosimo Corsi, Dean of the Sacred Roman Rota – cardinal priest of SS. Giovanni e Paolo, died 7 October 1870

== 27 January 1843 ==
1. Francesco di Paola Villadecani, archbishop of Messina – cardinal priest of S. Alessio (received the title on 22 June 1843), died 13 June 1861
2. Ignazio Giovanni Cadolini, titular archbishop of Edessa, secretary of S. C. Propaganda Fide – cardinal priest of S. Susanna (received the title on 30 January 1843), died 11 April 1850
3. Paolo Mangelli Orsi, auditor general of the Apostolic Camera – cardinal deacon of S. Maria della Scala (received the title on 30 January 1843), then cardinal deacon of S. Maria in Cosmedin (22 February 1844), died 4 March 1846
4. Giovanni Serafini, dean of the Apostolic Camera – cardinal deacon of SS. Vito e Modesto (received the title on 30 January 1843), then cardinal deacon of S. Maria in Cosmedin (16 April 1846), died 1 February 1855

== 19 June 1843 ==
1. Francisco de São Luís (Manuel Justiniano) Saraiva, O.S.B., patriarch of Lisbon– cardinal priest without the title, died 7 May 1845
2. Antonio Maria Cadolini, C.R.S.P., bishop of Ancona – cardinal priest of S. Clemente (received the title on 22 June 1843), died 1 August 1851

== 22 January 1844 ==
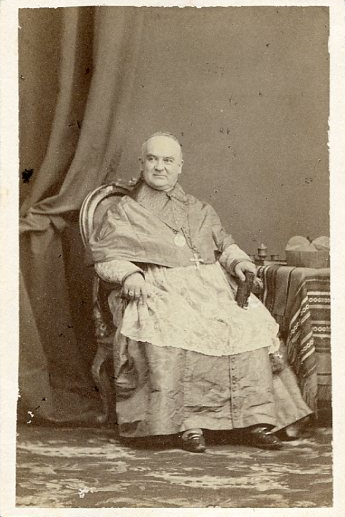
Niccola Paracciani Clarelli (1799-1872), made a cardinal on January 22, 1844.

1. Antonio Maria Cagiano de Azevedo, bishop-elect of Senigallia – cardinal priest of S. Croce in Gerusalemme (received the title on 25 January 1844), then cardinal bishop of Frascati (23 June 1854), died 13 January 1867
2. Niccola Paracciani Clarelli, bishop-elect of Montefiascone e Corneto – cardinal priest of S. Pietro in Vincoli (received the title on 25 January 1844), then cardinal bishop of Frascati (22 February 1867), died 7 July 1872
3. Fabio Maria Asquini, (in pectore published on 21 April 1845), Latin Patriarch of Constantinople, secretary of S. C. of Bishops and Regulars – cardinal priest of S. Stefano al Monte Celio (received the title on 24 April 1845), then cardinal priest of S. Lorenzo in Lucina (21 September 1877), died 23 December 1878

== 22 July 1844 ==
1. Domenico Carafa della Spina di Traetto, archbishop of Benevento – cardinal priest of S. Maria degli Angeli (received the title on 25 July 1844), then cardinal priest of S. Lorenzo in Lucina (12 May 1879), died 17 June 1879
2. Francesco Capaccini, auditor general of the Apostolic Camera (in pectore published on 21 April 1845) – cardinal priest without the title, died 15 June 1845
3. Giuseppe Antonio Zacchia Rondinini, vice-camerlengo and governor of Rome (in pectore published on 21 April 1845) – cardinal deacon of S. Nicola in Carcere (received the title on 24 April 1845), died 26 November 1845
4. Lorenzo Simonetti, protonotary apostolic (in pectore published on 24 November 1845) – cardinal priest of S. Lorenzo in Panisperna (received the title on 19 January 1846), died 9 January 1855
5. Giacomo Piccolomini, dean of the Apostolic Camera (in pectore published on 24 November 1845) – cardinal priest of S. Balbina (received the title on 19 January 1846), then cardinal priest of S. Marco (4 October 1847), died 17 August 1861

== 19 January 1846 ==
1. Guilherme Henriques de Carvalho, patriarch of Lisbon – cardinal priest of S. Maria sopra Minerva (received the title on 30 November 1854), died 15 November 1857
2. Sisto Riario Sforza, archbishop of Naples – cardinal priest of S. Sabina (received the title on 16 April 1846), died 29 September 1877
3. Joseph Bernet, archbishop of Aix – cardinal priest without the title, died 5 July 1846

Six additional cardinals were also created by Gregory XVI in pectore, but their names were never published.

== Additional sources ==
- Miranda, Salvador. "Consistories for the creation of Cardinals 19th Century (1800-1903): Gregory XVI (1831-1846)". The Cardinals of the Holy Roman Church. Florida International University. OCLC 53276621.
