= Triumvirate =

Regime dominated by three individuals

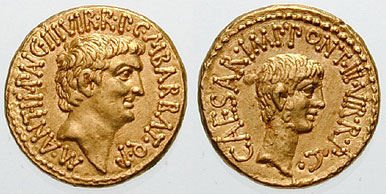
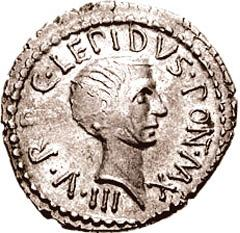
Coins of the triumvirs, Mark Antony, Octavian, and Lepidus, comprising the Second Triumvirate (43 – 33 or 27 BCE) during the Roman Republic. They bear the inscription iiivir r p c (triumvir rei publicae constituendae—"triumvir for the regulation of the republic").

A triumvirate (Latin: triumvirātus) or a triarchy is a political institution ruled or dominated by three individuals, known as triumvirs (Latin: triumviri). The arrangement can be formal or informal. Though the three leaders in a triumvirate are notionally equal, the actual distribution of power may vary.

Informally, the term "triumvirate" may be used for any association of three.

Under the influence of the Soviet Union, the term troika (Russian: for "group of three") may be used for "triumvirate".

== Pre-modern triumvirates ==
=== Biblical ===
In the Bible, triumvirates occurred at some notable events in both the Hebrew Bible (Old Testament) and New Testament. In the Book of Exodus, Moses, his brother Aaron and their nephew or brother-in-law, Hur, acted this way during the Battle of Refidim against the Amalekites. Later in Exodus 24, when Moses was away on Mount Sinai, Aaron and Hur were left in charge of all the Israelites.

In the Gospels, Peter, James, and his brother John were a leading trio among the Twelve Apostles on three specific occasions during the public ministry of Jesus: at the resurrection of the daughter of Jairus, the transfiguration of Jesus, and his agony in the Garden in Gethsemane. Later, in the time of the early Church, the triumvirate of the leading apostles changed slightly after the former James's death: it became composed of Peter, John, and James, brother of Jesus, known collectively also as the three Pillars of the Church.

Old Testament and New Testament triumvirates
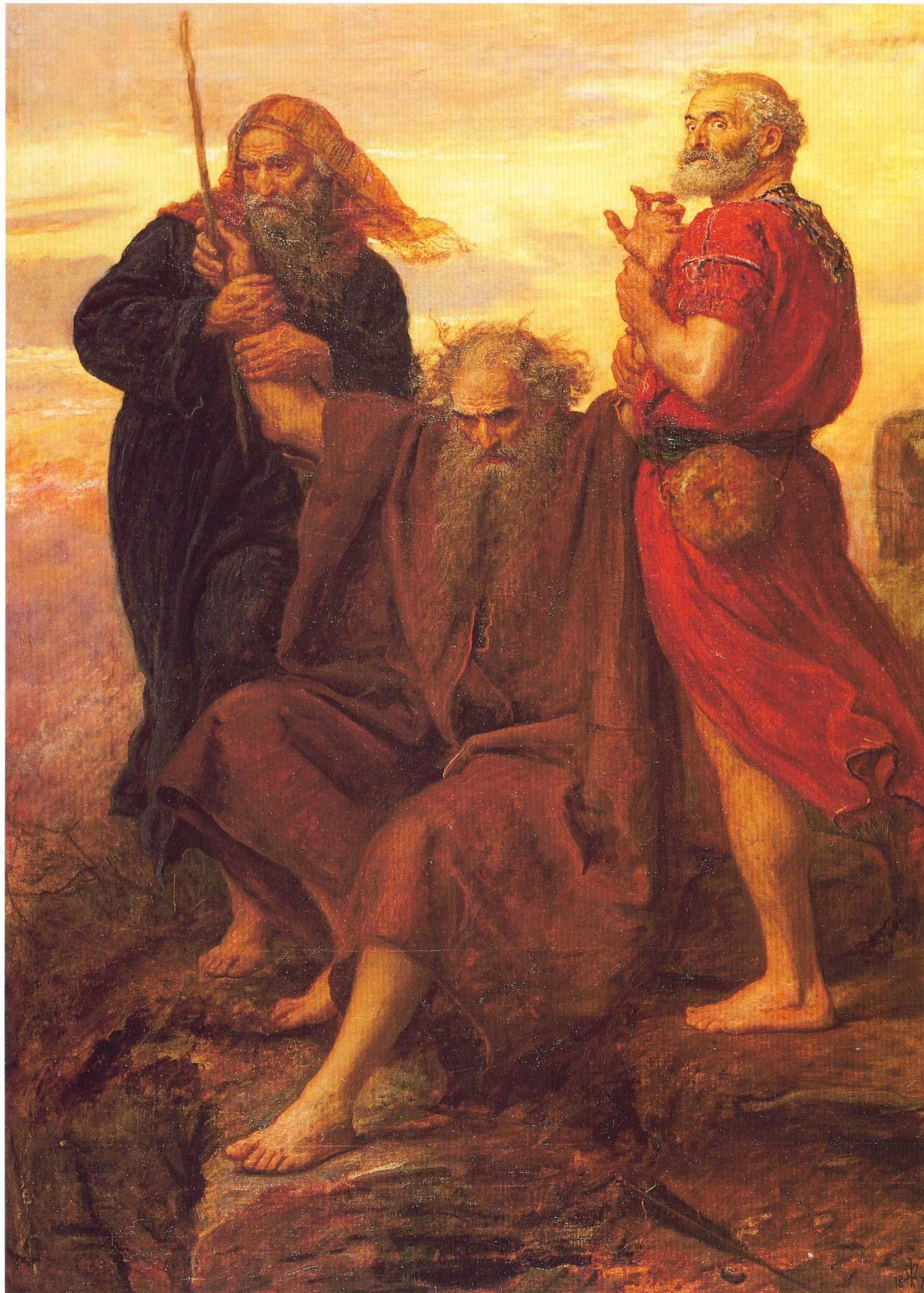
Moses (in the centre) along with Aaron and Hur at the Battle of Rephidim

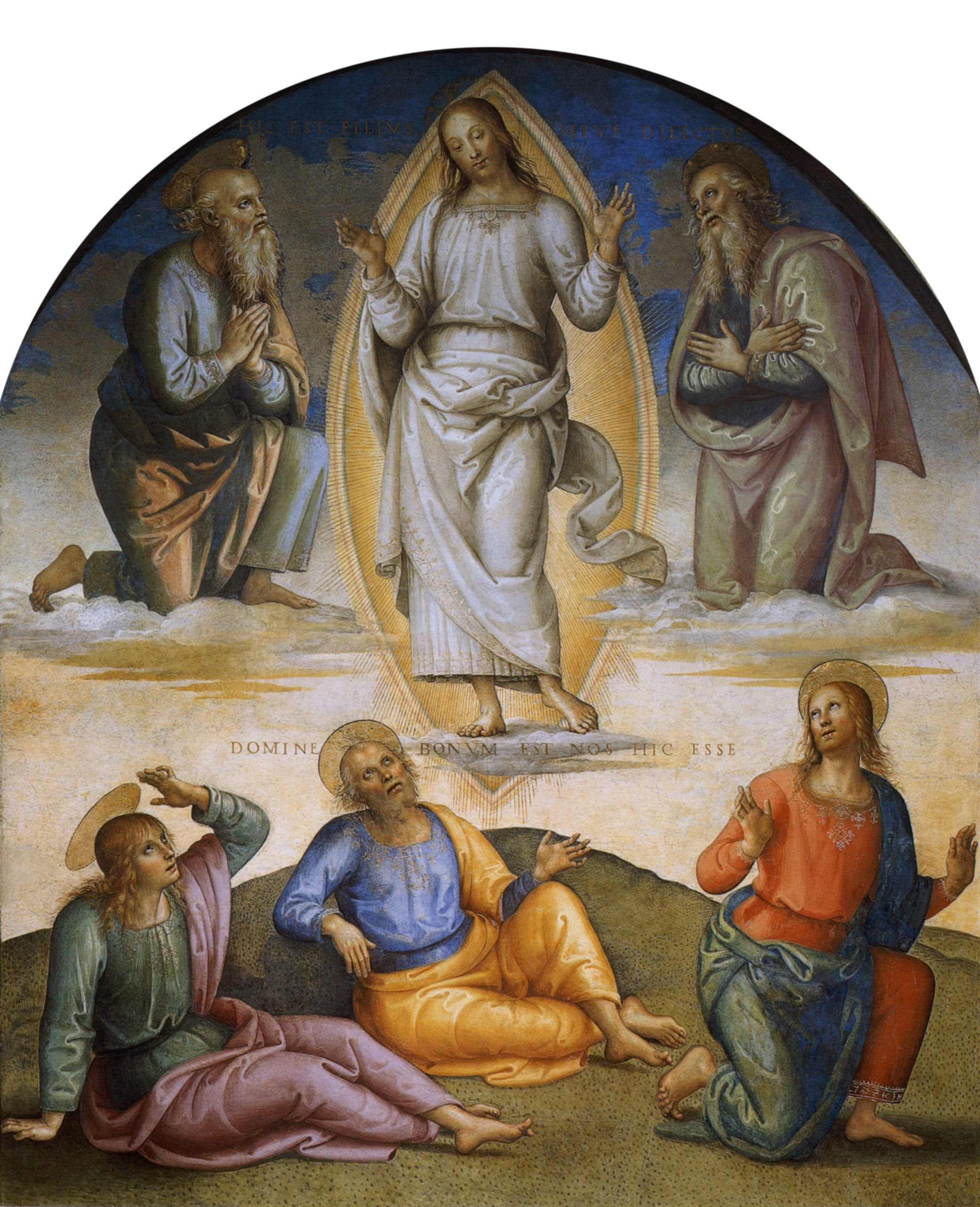
Peter (sitting in the centre) along with John and his brother James, son of Zebedee (sitting L-R) at the Transfiguration of Jesus

=== Ancient China ===
During the Han dynasty of Imperial China, the Three Excellencies—including the Grand chancellor, Grand Secretariat, and irregularly, the Grand Commandant—represented the most senior ministerial positions of state. This triumvirate was supported by the economic technocrat and imperial secretary Sang Hongyang (d. 80 BCE), their political ally. The acting chancellor, Tian Qianqiu, was also easily swayed by the decisions of the triumvirate.

The Three Excellencies existed during Western Han (202 BCE – 9 CE) as the Grand Chancellor, Grand Secretariat, and Grand Commandant, but the Grand Chancellor was viewed as senior to the Grand Secretariat while the post of Grand Commandant was vacant for most of the dynasty. After Emperor Guangwu established the Eastern Han (25–220 CE), the Grand Commandant was made a permanent official, while the Minister over the Masses replaced the Grand Chancellor, and the Minister of Works replaced the Grand Secretariat. Unlike the three high officials in Western Han, when the Grand Chancellor was senior to all, these new three senior officials had equal censorial and advisory powers. When a young or weak-minded emperor ascended to the throne, these Three Excellencies could dominate state affairs. There were also other types of triumvirates during the Eastern Han; for example, at the onset of the reign of Emperor Ling of Han (r. 168–189), the General-in-chief Dou Wu (d. 168), the Grand Tutor Chen Fan (d. 168), and another prominent statesman Hu Guang (91–172) formed a triumvirate nominally in charge of the Privy Secretariat, when in fact it was a regent triumvirate that was overseeing the affairs of state and Emperor Ling.

=== Hinduism ===
In Hinduism, the gods Brahma, Vishnu, and Shiva form the theological triumvirate of the Trimurti, representing the balanced forces of creation, preservation, and destruction, respectively. Their female counterparts and consorts, the goddesses Saraswati, Lakshmi and Parvati, make up the parallel Tridevi.

=== Pagaruyung ===
Triumvirates during the Pagaruyung era in the Minangkabau Highlands were known as Rajo Tigo Selo, or "the three reigning kings." The Rajo Tigo Selo was descended from the same line in the same dynasty and ruled at the same reigning time. It consisted of three kings, the Rajo Alam who ruled the government and diplomatic affairs, the Rajo Adaik who ruled the customs and the Rajo Ibadaik who acted as a Grand Mufti.

=== Ancient Rome ===
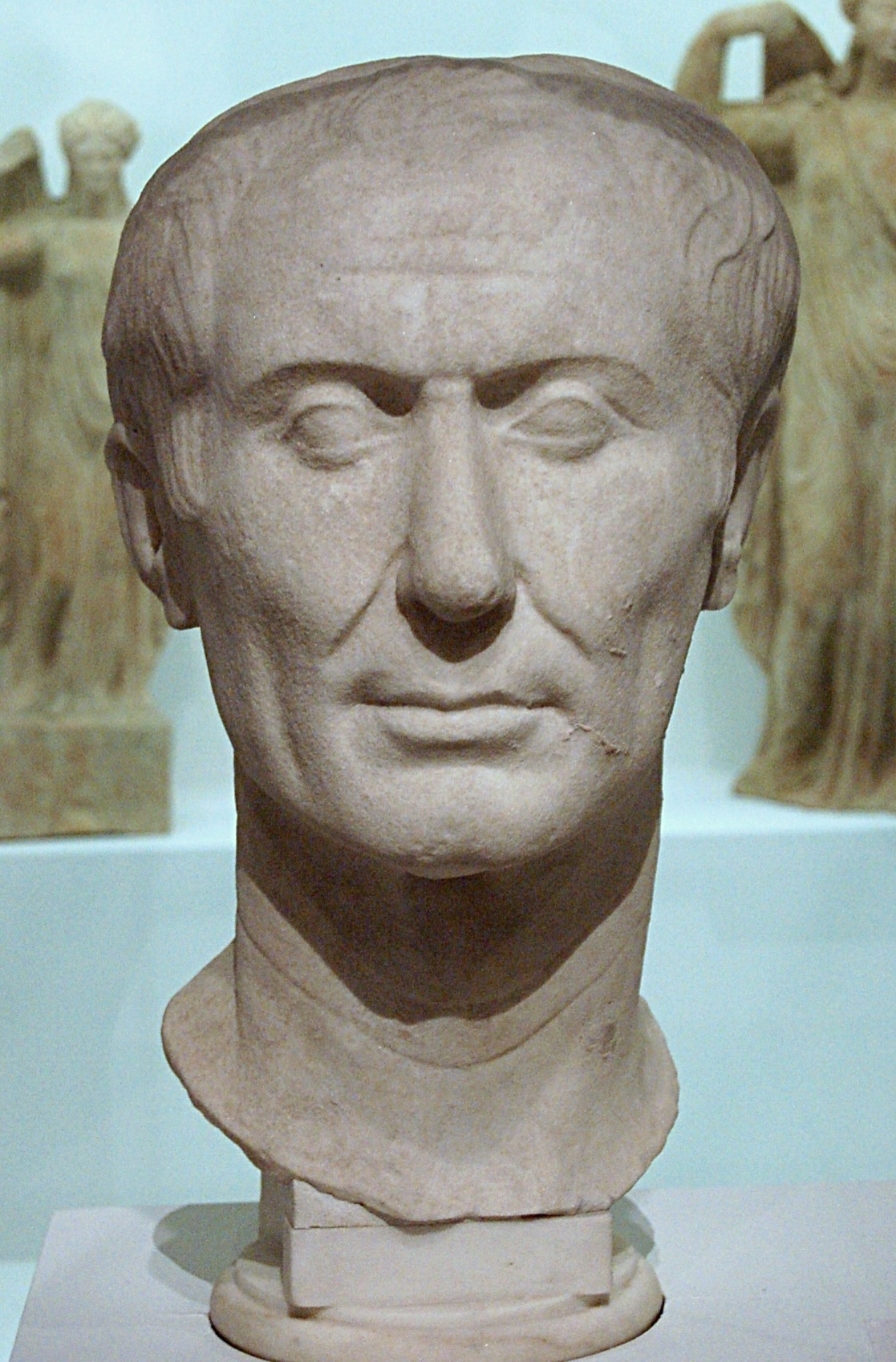
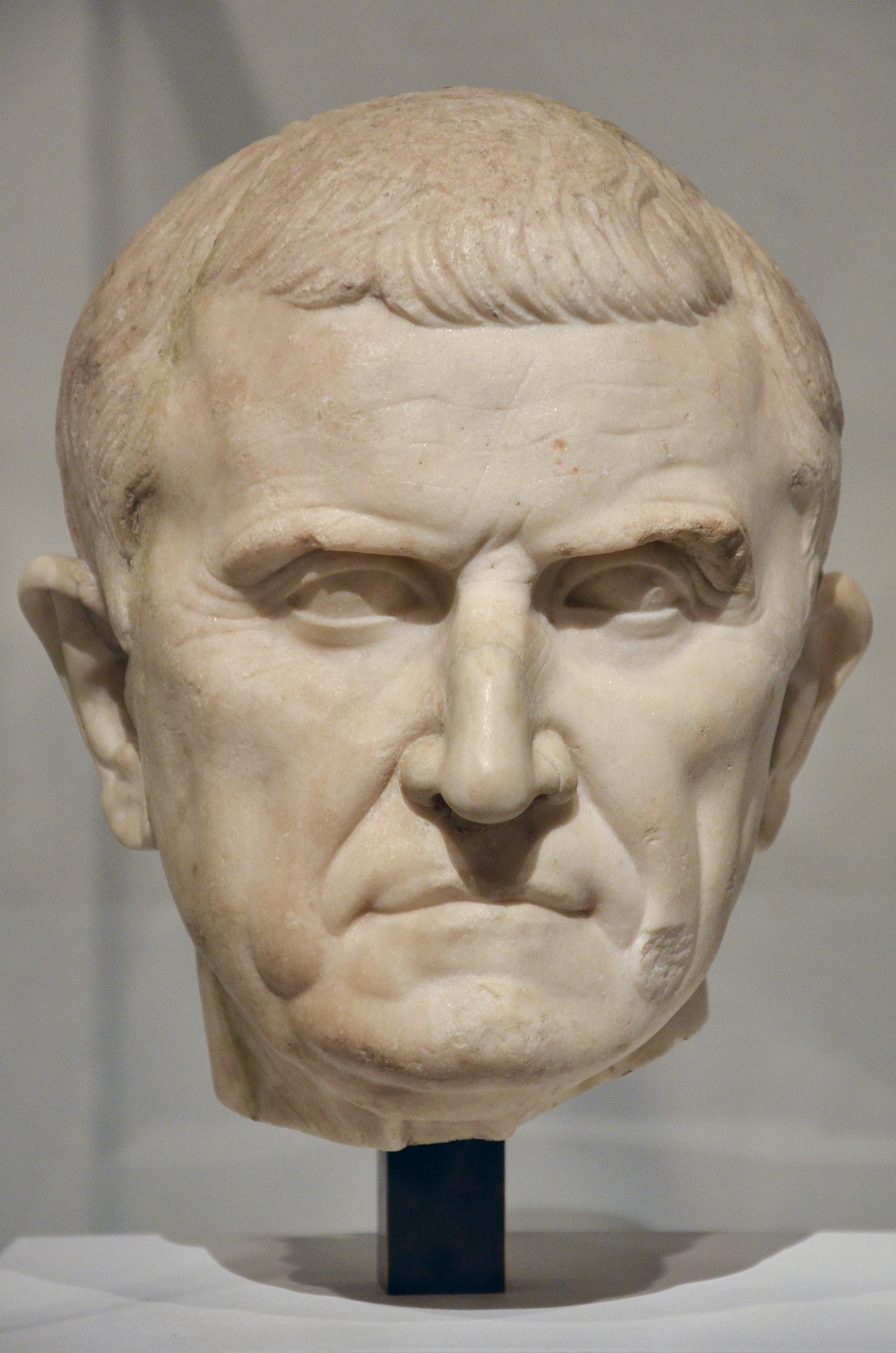
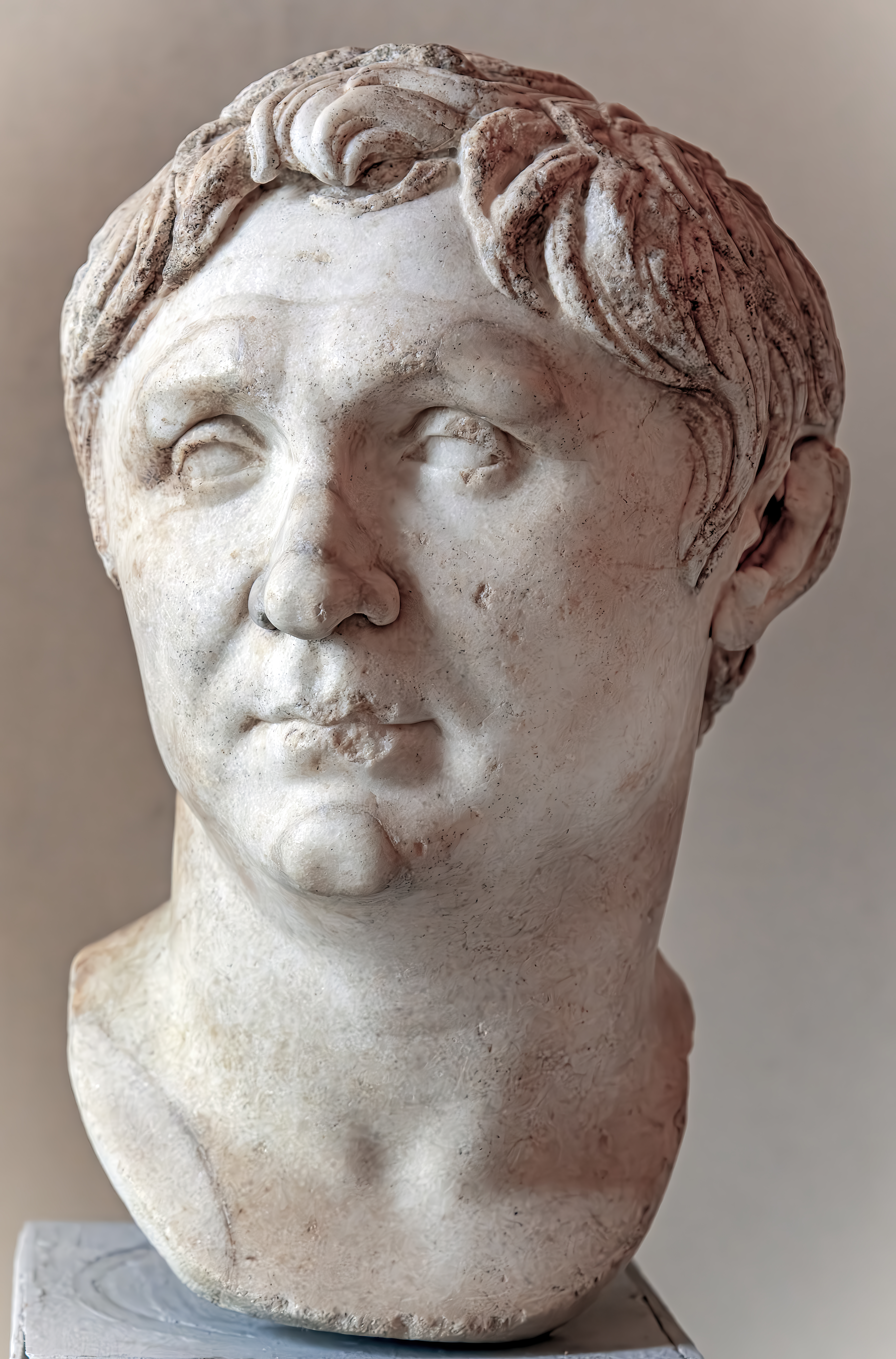
Left to right: Roman busts of Julius Caesar, Crassus and Pompey.

During the Roman Republic, triumviri (or tresviri) were special commissions of three men appointed for specific administrative tasks apart from the regular duties of Roman magistrates.

The term triumvirate is most commonly used by historians of ancient Rome to refer to two political alliances during the crisis of the Roman Republic:

- The First Triumvirate of Julius Caesar, Pompey the Great, and Marcus Licinius Crassus, formed in 60 BCE or 59 BCE as an alliance among three prominent politicians and lasting until the death of Crassus in the Battle of Carrhae in 53 BCE.
- The Second Triumvirate (the Tresviri reipublicae constituendae) of Octavian (later Caesar Augustus), Mark Antony, and Lepidus, formed in 43 BCE as an official, legally established institution, formally recognized by the Roman Senate in the Lex Titia and lasted de facto until the fall of Lepidus in 36 BCE, de jure until 32 BCE.

=== Tamil ===
The Three Crowned Kings refers to the triumvirate of Chola, Chera, and Pandya who dominated the politics of the ancient Tamil country. Sivaperuman, Murugan, and Agatiyar are considered the triumvirate of the Tamil language and Sangam literature.

=== Rum Seljuks ===
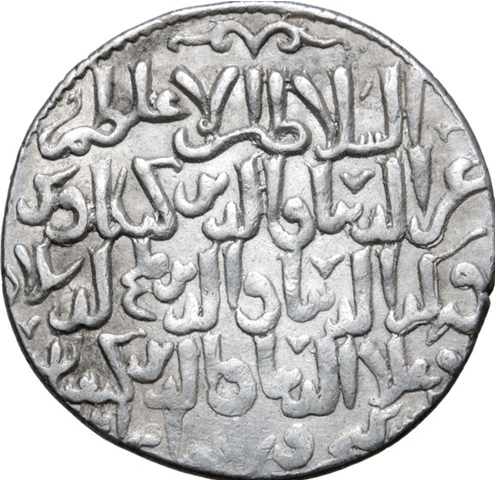
Seljuk dirham struck on behalf of three sultans, citing their names

In 1246, Rum Seljuk sultan Kaykaus II was invited to Güyük Khan's coronation. Instead, he sent Kilij Arslan IV, who went to Karakorum with a delegation. Two years later, he was accompanied by a Mongolian military unit of 2000 soldiers and returned to Anatolia with a jarlig given by Guyuk declaring him sultan. He was recognized as sultan in Sivas, Erzincan, Diyarbakır, Malatya, Harput. Later, a meeting was held, resulting in an accord where the three brothers (Kaykaus, Kilij, and Kayqubad) would share the throne. A khutbah was read on their behalf, and coins were struck in their names. However, influenced by some emirs, Kilij Arslan did not accept this and went into conflict with Kaykaus but suffered an unexpected defeat. On 14 June 1249, he was caught and brought to his brother. However, he was well received and returned together to Konya. Both were enthroned alongside Kayqubad II. Thus a period of joint rule began from 1249 until 1254. Kaykaus controlled the capital, Konya, and everything further west, and the coast at Antalya, up to Ankara. Kilij Arslan was allocated everything to the east of Konya up to Erzurum. Kayqubad was granted minor estates on a scale sufficient for his personal expenses.

== Modern triumvirates ==
=== Ottoman Empire ===
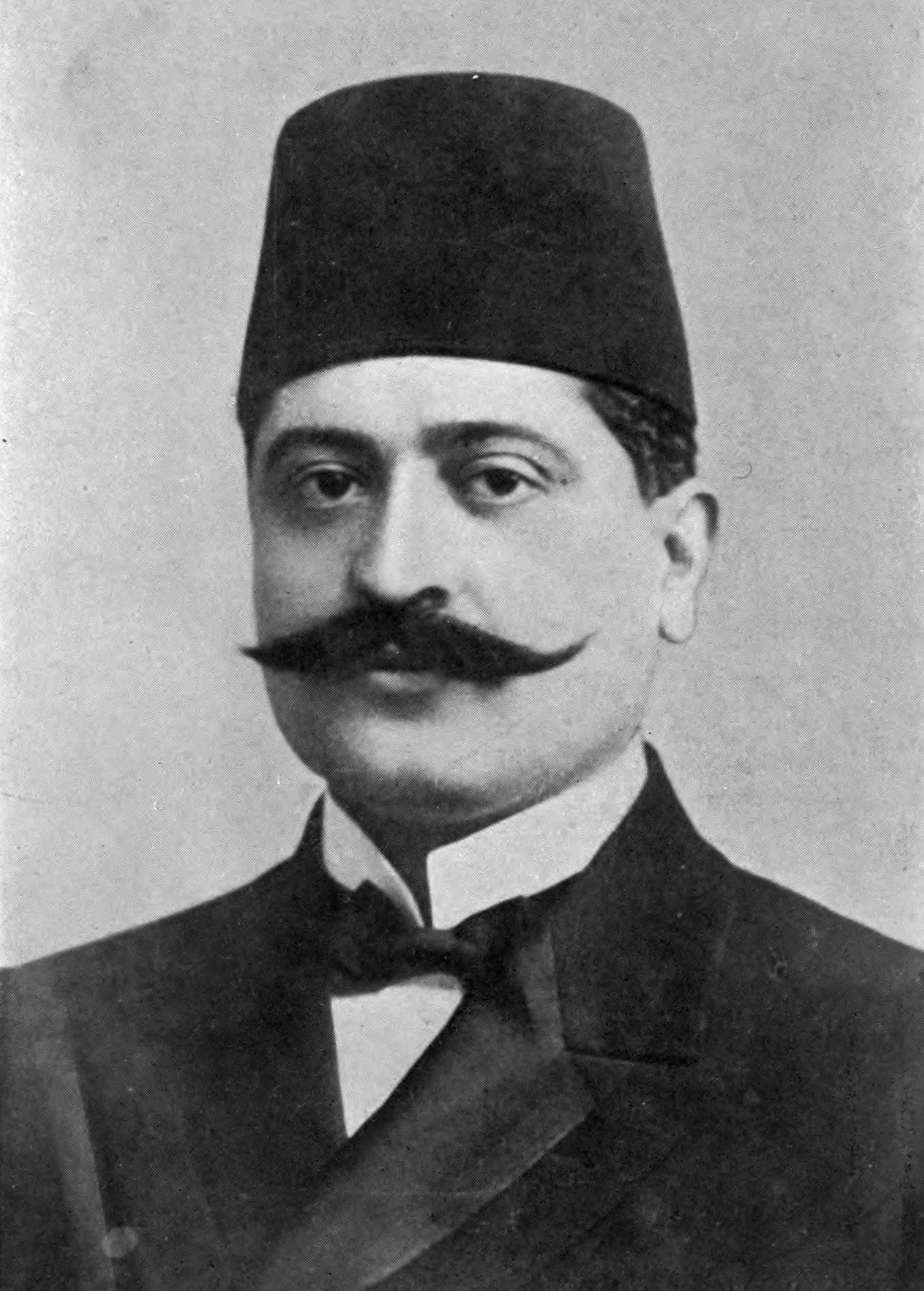
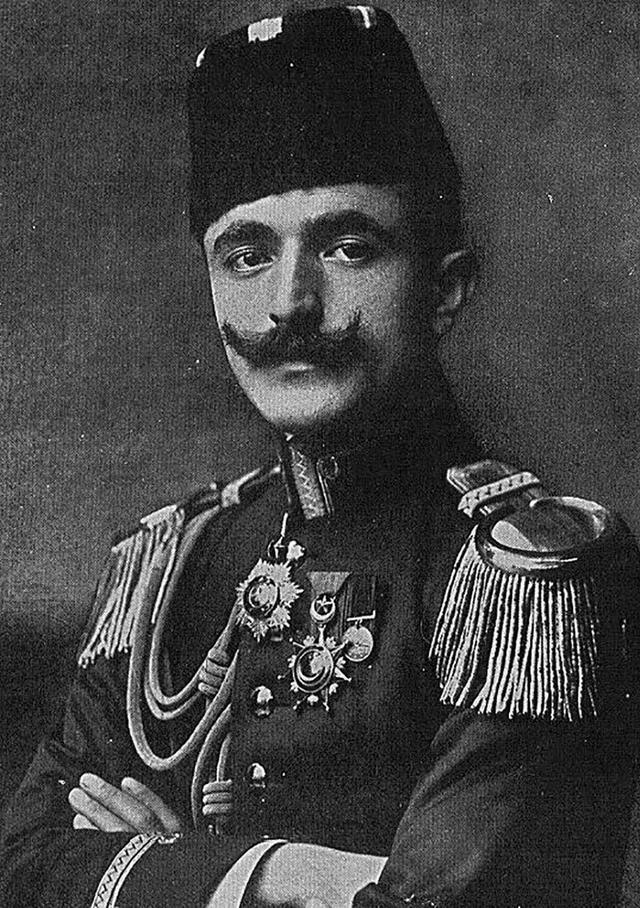
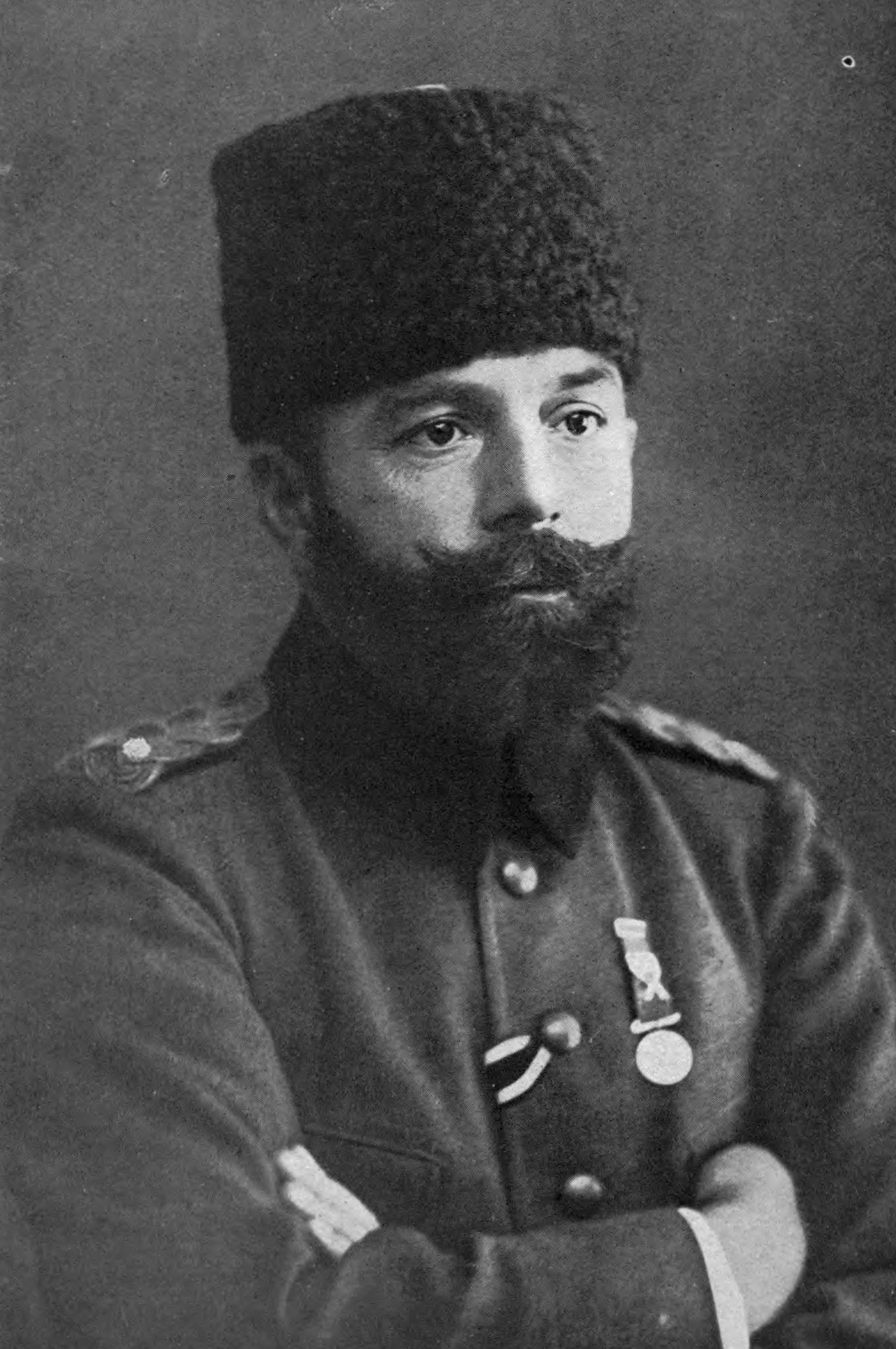
The Three Pashas

Talaat Pasha (left), Enver Pasha (middle), Djemal Pasha (right)

The Three Pashas also known as Ottoman Triumvirate effectively ruled the Ottoman Empire during World War I: Mehmed Talaat Pasha (1874–1921), the Grand Vizier (prime minister) and Minister of the Interior; Ismail Enver Pasha (1881–1922), the Minister of War; and Ahmed Djemal Pasha (1872–1922), the Minister of the Navy.

=== Early modern and modern France ===
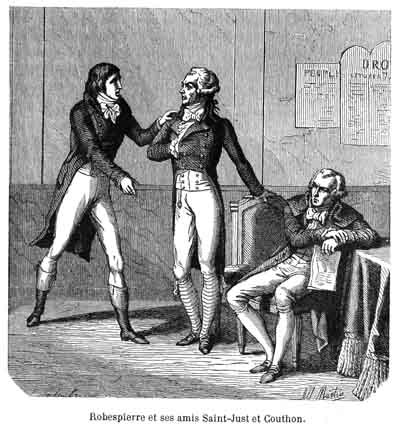
Triumvirate of (L-R) Saint-Just, Robespierre, and Couthon

During the French Revolution, many commentators referred to the National Convention headed by Robespierre as both a dictatorship and a triumvirate.

Prior to Napoleon and during the Terror from 1793 to 1794 Maximilien Robespierre, Louis Antoine de Saint-Just, and Georges Couthon, as members of the governing Committee of Public Safety, were accused by their political opponents of forming an unofficial triumvirate, pointing out the First Triumvirate of Julius Caesar, Pompey, and Crassus which led to the end of the Roman Republic. Although officially all members of the committee shared equal power the three men's friendship and close ideological base led their detractors to declaim them as triumvirs which was used against them in the coup of 9 Thermidor (27 July 1794).

=== Czechoslovakia ===
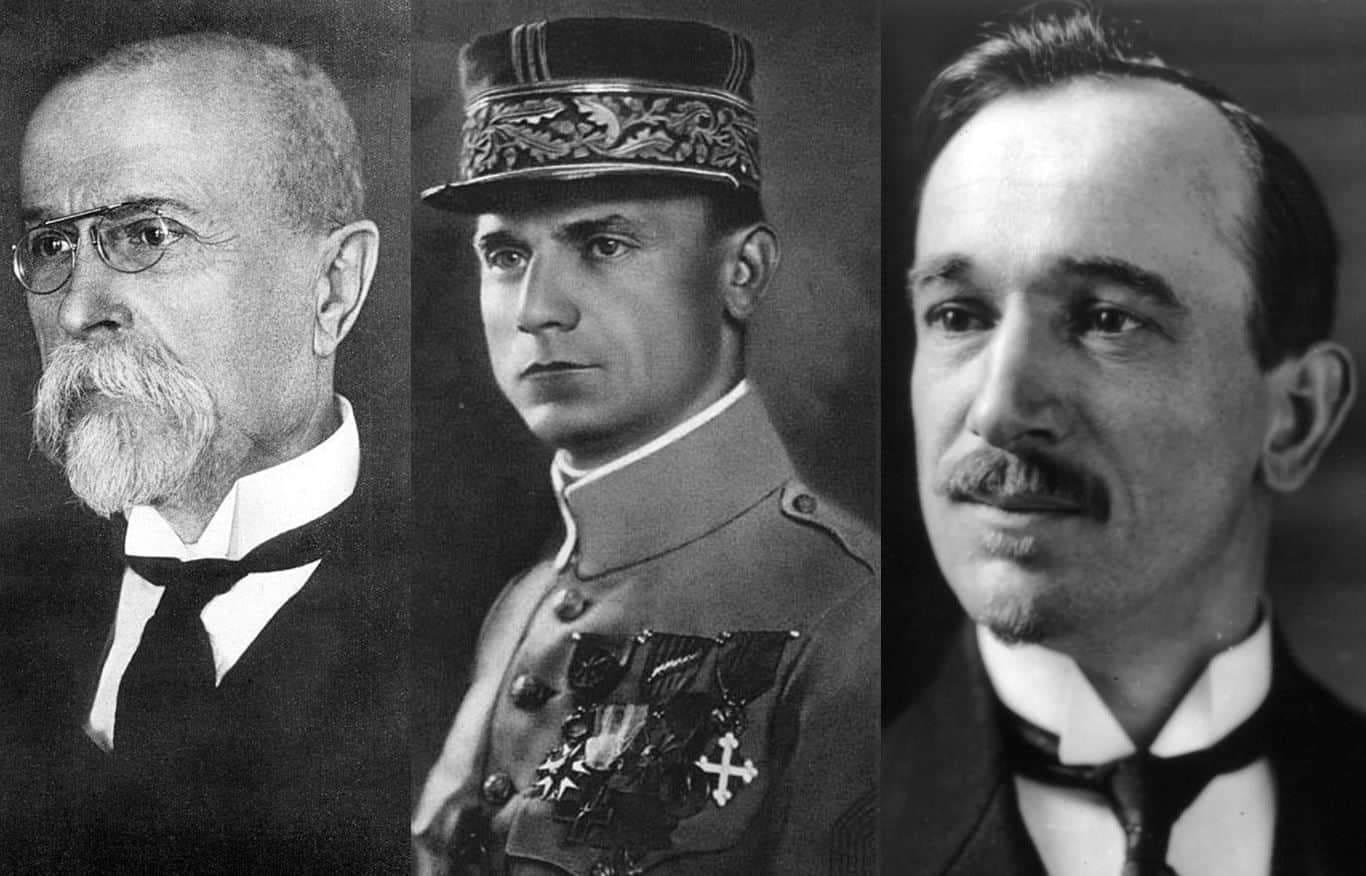
(L-R) Tomáš Garrigue Masaryk, Milan Rastislav Štefánik, and Edvard Beneš

The Czechoslovak National Council, an organization founded in Paris in 1916 by Czech and Slovak émigrés during World War I to liberate their homeland from Austria-Hungary, consisted of the triumvirate of Tomáš Garrigue Masaryk as a chairman, Edvard Beneš, who joined Masaryk in exile in 1915, as the organization's general secretary, and Milan Rastislav Štefánik, a Slovak who was an aviator in the French Army, designating to represent Slovak interests in the national council. During the closing weeks of the war, the Czechoslovak National Council was formally upgraded to a provisional government and its members were designated to hold top offices in the First Czechoslovak Republic.

=== Modern Israel ===
- 2008–2009: Then Prime Minister Ehud Olmert, Defense Minister Ehud Barak, and Minister of Foreign Affairs Tzipi Livni were sometimes referred to as a triumvirate.
- 2012: The leadership of Shas, the ultra-orthodox Sepharadi political party of Israel, was given by its spiritual leader, Rabbi Ovadia Yosef and the Council of Torah Sages, to a triumvirate formed by the convicted Aryeh Deri, who decided to return to politics after a thirteen-year hiatus, the former party leader Eli Yishai and Ariel Atias.

=== Benin ===
- 13 April 1970 until 26 October 1972: After the contentious 1970 presidential elections, the country of Benin (then known as the Republic of Dahomey) adopted a Presidential Council which included the three main political figures in the country: Hubert Maga, Justin Ahomadégbé-Tomêtin, and Sourou-Migan Apithy. In addition, the formal office of President would rotate between the three of them beginning with Hubert Maga. After one successful change of leadership, military leader Mathieu Kérékou staged a coup and overthrew the Presidential Council becoming the leader of the country until 1991.

=== Soviet Union ===
See also List of Troikas in the Soviet Union

In the context of the Soviet Union, the term troika (Russian: for "group of three") is used for "triumvirate".

- May 1922 – April 1925: When Vladimir Lenin suffered his first stroke in May 1922, a Troika was established to govern the country in his place, although Lenin briefly returned to the leadership from 2 October 1922 until a severe stroke on 9 March 1923 ended his political career. The Troika consisted of Joseph Stalin, Lev Kamenev, and Grigory Zinoviev. The Troika broke up in April 1925, when Kamenev and Zinoviev found themselves in a minority over their belief that socialism could only be achieved internationally. Zinoviev and Kamenev joined forces with Leon Trotsky's Left Opposition in early 1926. Later, Kamenev, Zinoviev and Trotsky would all be murdered on Stalin's orders.
- 13 March – 26 June 1953: After the death of Joseph Stalin in March 1953, power was shared between Georgy Malenkov, Lavrenty Beria, and Vyacheslav Molotov.
- 14 October 1964 – 16 June 1977: After the removal of Nikita Khrushchev in October 1964, the Soviet Union went through a period of collective leadership. Power was initially shared between General Secretary (until 1966 First Secretary) Leonid Brezhnev, Premier Alexei Kosygin, and Chairman of the Presidium of the Supreme Soviet (nominal de jure head of state) Anastas Mikoyan. Mikoyan was replaced by Nikolai Podgorny in 1965.

Triumvirate of: (L–R) Nikolai Podgorny, Leonid Brezhnev, and Alexei Kosygin during October Revolution anniversary celebrations in 1973

=== Modern Italy ===
In the Roman Republic (1849), the title of two sets of three joint chiefs of state in the year 1849:

- 29 March – 1 July 1849: Carlo Armellini (1777–1863), Giuseppe Mazzini (1805–1872), and Conte Aurelio Saffi (1819–1890)
- 1–4 July 1849: Aurelio Saffi (again), Alessandro Calandrelli (1805–1888), and Livio Mariani (1793–1855)

Almost immediately following the Roman Republic, the Red Triumvirate governed the restored Papal States from 1849 to 1850:

- 1 August 1849 – 12 April 1850: Cardinals Gabriele della Genga Sermattei (1801–1861), Lodovico Altieri (1805–1867), and Luigi Vannicelli Casoni (1801–1877)

=== Brazil ===
Throughout Brazilian history, there have been 4 triumvirates:

- 7 April – 17 June 1831: Emperor Pedro I of Brazil abdicates the throne, and his son, Pedro II of Brazil, cannot assume it due to his age. Thus, the Provisional Triune Regency is formed. The rulers of the Triumvirate were Francisco de Lima e Silva, Campos Vergueiro, and Carneiro de Campos.
- 17 June 1831 – 1835: The Permanent Triune Regency, composed of Francisco de Lima e Silva (again), José da Costa Carvalho and João Bráulio Muniz, assumes power.
- 24 October – 3 November 1930: Following the Revolution of 1930 and the deposition of Washington Luís, a provisional military junta assumed power. The regents were Augusto Tasso Fragoso, José Isaías de Noronha and João de Deus Mena Barreto. After this period of military rule, Getúlio Vargas was sworn in as president of Brazil.
- 31 August – 30 October 1969: A military junta assumed power after Artur da Costa e Silva was removed from the presidency due to health problems. The rulers of the Triumvirate were Augusto Rademaker, Aurélio de Lira Tavares and Márcio Melo. Pedro Aleixo, Costa e Silva's civilian vice-president, should have become interim president under the Brazilian Constitution of 1967, but was prevented from assuming the position.

=== Paraguay ===
Paraguay had four brief triumvirates after the Paraguay campaign, with only the penultimate lasting more than a year:

- Shared Governorate, 16 May – 17 June 1811
  - Bernardo de Velasco
  - José Gaspar Rodríguez de Francia
  - Juan Valeriano de Zevallos
- Liberal Triumvirate, 21 January – 9 February 1841
  - Juan José Medina
  - José Gabriel Benítez
  - José Domingo Ocampos
- Postwar Triumvirate, 15 August 1869 – 31 August 1870
  - Cirilo Antonio Rivarola
  - Carlos Loizaga
  - José Díaz de Bedoya
- Triumvirate of the 1911 Civil War, 14 January 1912 – 17 January 1912
  - Mario Uscher
  - Alfredo Aponte
  - Marcos Caballero Codas

=== Iran ===
Following the death of Supreme Leader Ali Khamenei in March 2026, Iranian authorities announced a three-member temporary leadership council described as the "Triumvirate Transitional Administration" to exercise the duties of the supreme leader until a successor is selected by the Assembly of Experts. The arrangement was variously described in media reports as an interim leadership council or a triumvirate.

The council consists of President Masoud Pezeshkian, Judiciary Chief Gholam-Hossein Mohseni-Eje'i, and Guardian Council member Alireza Arafi. Under Article 111 of the Constitution of the Islamic Republic of Iran, the temporary council is composed of the president, the head of the judiciary, and a faqih from the Guardian Council; the body temporarily assumes the duties of the leader until a new one is chosen.

Pezeshkian's place on the council derives from the presidency, which the Iranian constitution defines as the country's highest official after the leader and the head of the executive branch in matters not directly reserved to the office of the leadership. Mohseni-Eje'i sits on the council as head of the judiciary, an office that serves as the highest judicial authority and oversees the administration of justice, judicial organization, and the appointment and management of judges. Arafi was appointed as the council's clerical member from the Guardian Council; that body reviews legislation for compatibility with Islam and the constitution, supervises elections, and vets candidates for office.

Arafi's selection was also politically significant because, in addition to serving on the Guardian Council, he has held senior clerical posts in Qom and is a member of the Assembly of Experts, the body responsible for appointing and supervising the supreme leader.

The three members were also reported to have expressed differing public positions during the ensuing regional crisis. On 7 March 2026, Pezeshkian apologised to neighbouring countries and said Iranian armed forces would stop attacks on them, while Mohseni-Eje'i rejected Pezeshkian's apology and said strikes on some regional countries would continue.

On 9 March 2026, Iranian state television announced that the Assembly of Experts had selected Mojtaba Khamenei, the second son of Ali Khamenei, as the new supreme leader of Iran. Reuters reported that the Assembly said in a statement issued shortly after midnight Tehran time that Mojtaba had been appointed "by a decisive vote" as the third leader of the Islamic Republic. AP reported that state television said he had been selected by "strong" votes and broadcast footage of celebrations in Tehran.

Following the announcement, Iranian state media reported that the leadership of the armed forces pledged allegiance to Mojtaba Khamenei and that the Islamic Revolutionary Guard Corps declared its readiness to follow the new supreme leader. Under Article 111 of the Constitution of the Islamic Republic of Iran, the temporary leadership council exercises the duties of the leader only until a new leader is chosen; the selection of Mojtaba Khamenei therefore ended the council's interim role.

=== Unofficial triumvirates ===
The term has been used as a term of convenience, though not an official title, also for other groups of three in a similar position:

- Great Triumvirate (19th-century American politics – Henry Clay, Daniel Webster, and John C. Calhoun)

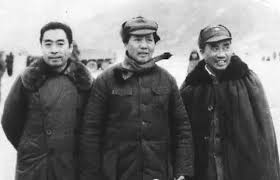
Zhou Enlai, Mao Zedong, and Zhu De during the Long March

- Mao Zedong, Zhou Enlai, and Zhu De as the three principal founders of the People's Republic of China in 1949 and leading members of the first generation of the Chinese communist leaders. They all died in 1976 while holding the highest party and state offices Chairman of the Chinese Communist Party (Mao), Premier of the State Council (Zhou) and Chairman of the Standing Committee of the National People's Congress, the nominal head of state (Zhu).
- Bourbon Triumvirate (19th-century American politics – Joseph E. Brown, Alfred H. Colquitt, and John Brown Gordon)
- After the Lisbon Treaty came into force from 1 December 2009:
  - President of the European Council – António Costa
  - President of the European Commission – Ursula von der Leyen
  - High Representative of the Union for Foreign Affairs and Security Policy – Kaja Kallas
- Great Triumvirate (early 20th-century golf – Harry Vardon, James Braid, and J.H. Taylor)
- Eric Schmidt, former CEO of Google has referred to himself, along with founders Larry Page and Sergey Brin as part of a triumvirate, stating, "This triumvirate has made an informal deal to stick together for at least 20 years".
- Weimar Triangle, regional alliance of France, Germany, and Poland created in 1991

== See also ==
- Constitution of the Roman Republic
- Council of Three (disambiguation)
- Decemvirate
- Diarchy
- Duumviri
- European troika
- Monarchy
- Septemvir
- Tetrarchy
