= 1846 conclave =

Election of Catholic Pope Pius IX

Papal conclave June 1846

Dates and location
- 14–16 June 1846; Quirinal Palace, Papal States

Key officials
- Dean: Ludovico Micara
- Sub-dean: Vincenzo Macchi
- Camerlengo: Tommaso Riario Sforza
- Protopriest: Carlo Oppizzoni
- Protodeacon: Tommaso Riario Sforza
- Secretary: Giovanni Bussi

Election
- Electors: 50 (12 absentees)
- Ballots: 4

Elected pope
- Giovanni Mastai-Ferretti; Name taken: Pius IX
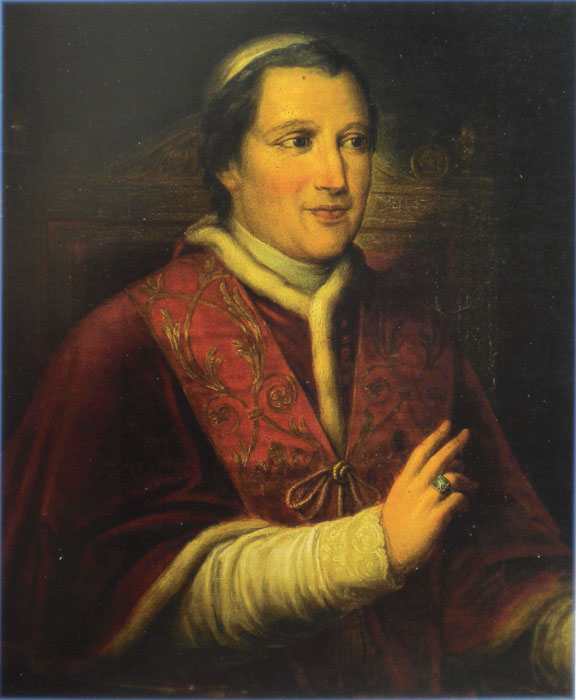

A conclave was held from 14 to 16 June 1846 to elect a new pope to succeed Gregory XVI, who had died in 1 June. Of the 62 members of the College of Cardinals, all but twelve attended. (Note: The current 80-year-old age limit for cardinal electors was introduced by Pope Paul VI in 1970.) On the fourth ballot, the conclave elected Cardinal Giovanni Mastai-Ferretti, the archbishop-bishop of Imola. After accepting his election, he took the name Pius IX. This conclave was the last to elect a ruler of the Papal States, the extensive lands around Rome and Central Italy which the Catholic Church governed until 1870.

== Background ==
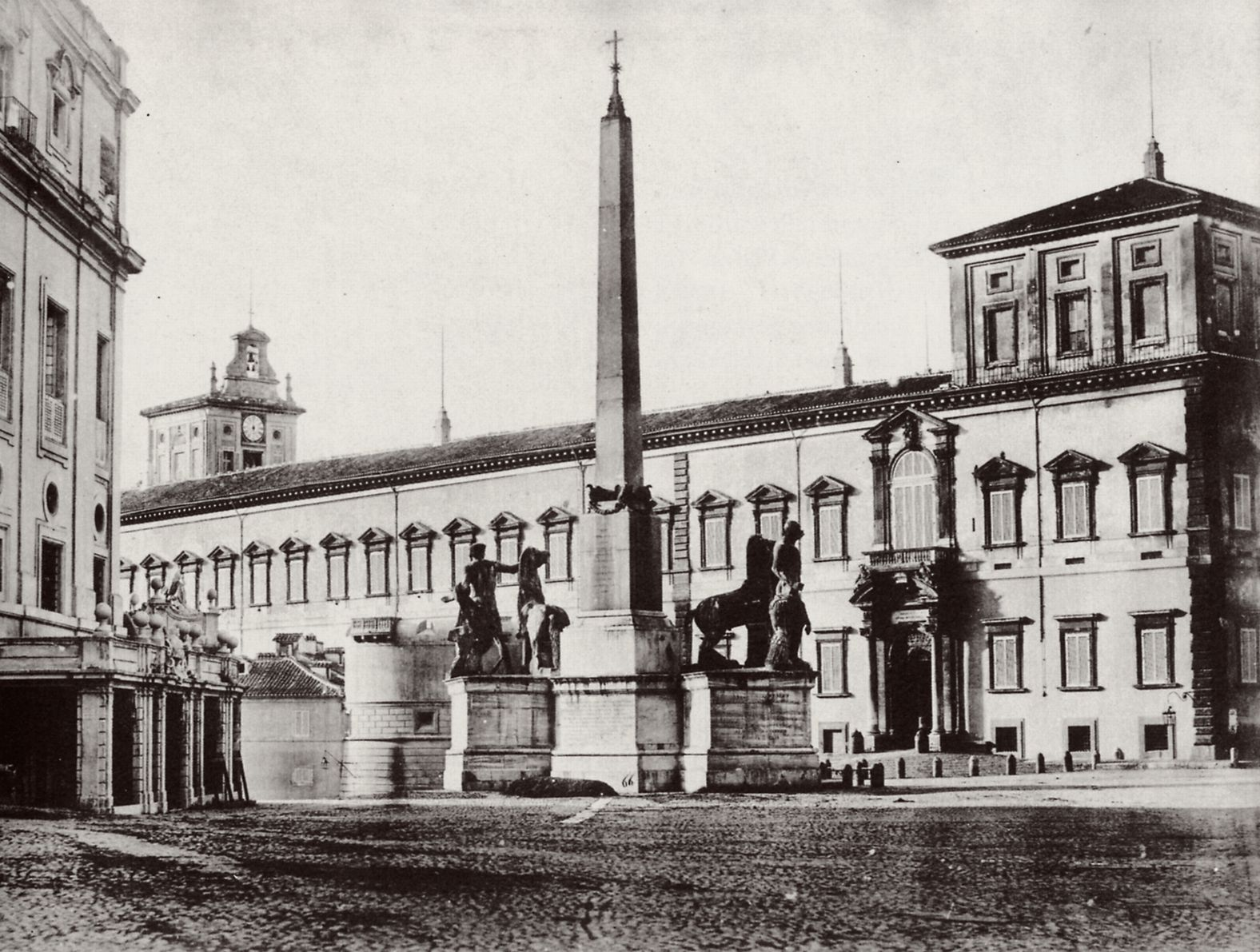
Quirinal Palace circa 1860. The pope's residence as the head of state of the Papal States was the venue of the conclave.

Coat of arms of Cardinal Tommaso Riario Sforza as the camerlengo

It was the issue of the government of the Papal States that was to prove central to the 1846 conclave. The College of Cardinals was split into two factions. The conservatives wished to see a continuation of papal absolutism in the governance of the Papal States, a continuation of the hardline policies of Pope Gregory XVI and his right-wing Secretary of State, Luigi Lambruschini, while the liberals wished for some measure of moderate reform and favored two candidates in Tommaso Pasquale Gizzi and Giovanni Mastai-Ferretti. A fourth papabile was Cardinal Ludovico Micara, the Dean of the College of Cardinals, who was favored by the residents of Rome itself but he never gained support among the cardinals. Lambruschini himself was the leader of the conservatives, while Tommaso Bernetti, who had served as pro-secretary of state under Pope Leo XII and the early part of Pope Gregory XVI's reign, was the leader of the liberal faction.

Lambruschini received a majority of the votes in the early ballots but failed to achieve the required two-thirds majority. Cardinal Mastai-Ferretti reportedly received 15 votes with the rest going to Lambruschini and Gizzi. Cardinal Gizzi was favored by the French government but failed to get additional support from the cardinals and the conclave ended up ultimately as a contest between Cardinals Lambruschini and Mastai-Ferretti. In the meantime, Cardinal Bernetti reportedly received information that Karl Kajetan von Gaisruck, the Austrian Archbishop of Milan, was on his way to the conclave to veto the election of Mastai-Ferretti and realized that, if Mastai-Ferretti was to be elected, he had to convince the cardinals within a few hours or accept the election of Lambruschini. Bernetti then on his own initiative personally convinced the majority of the electors to switch their support to Mastai-Ferretti. Cardinal Mastai-Ferretti himself, however, made no effort to campaign for the papacy, made no promises, and maintained aloofness throughout the process. Despite not having campaigned for the papacy, Cardinal Mastai-Ferretti was perceived to be "A glamorous candidate, ardent, emotional with a gift for friendship and a track-record of generosity even towards anti-Clericals and Carbonari. He was a patriot, known to be critical of Gregory XVI." Faced with deadlock and persuaded by Bernetti to keep Lambruschini from being elected pope, liberals and moderates decided to cast their votes for Mastai-Ferretti in a move that contradicted the general mood throughout Europe.

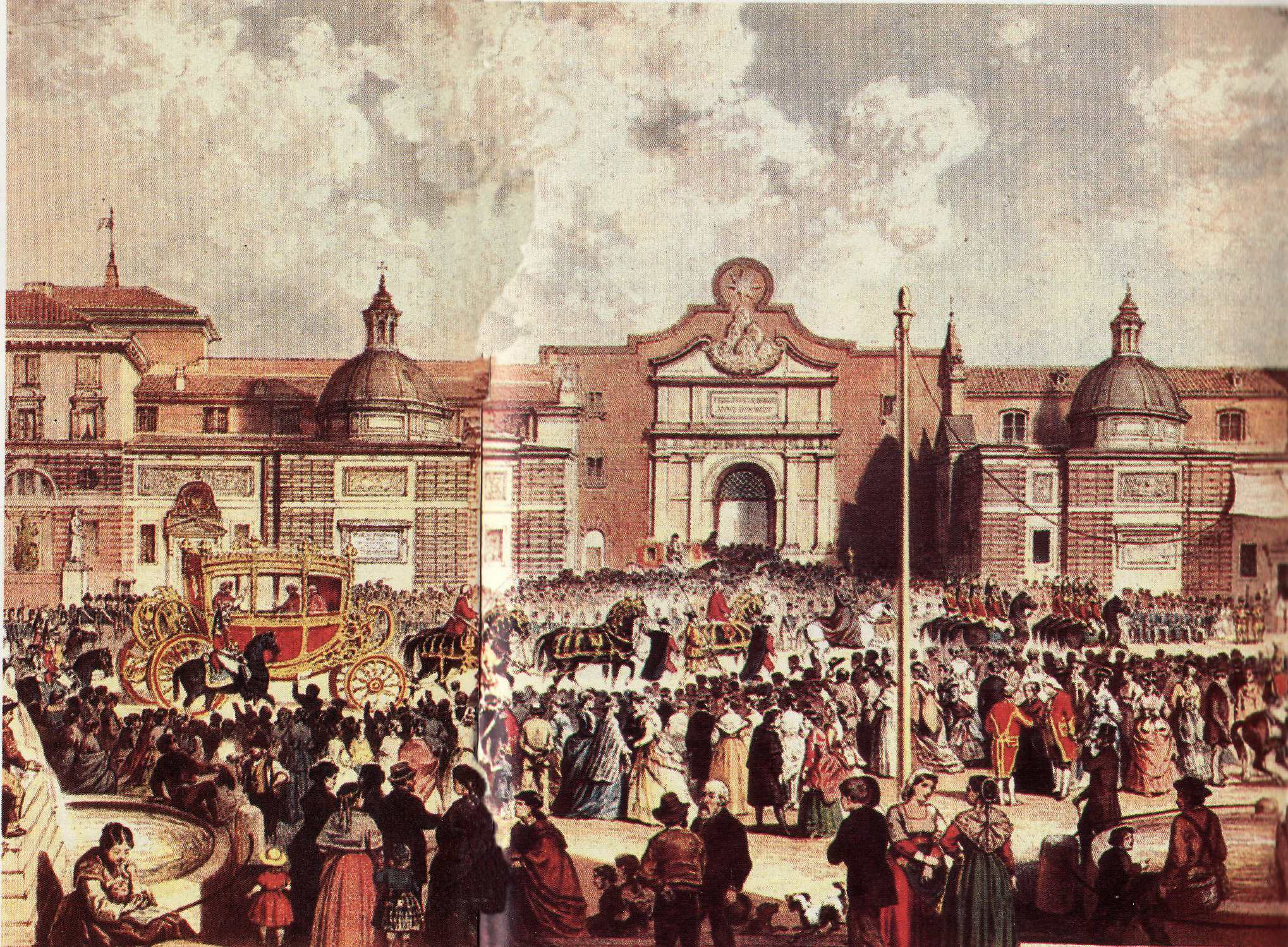
The carriage of Pius IX driving through the crowd after his election being announced on 17 June 1846.

On the second day of the conclave, on 16 June 1846, during the evening ballot or the fourth ballot, the liberal candidate, Mastai-Ferretti, Archbishop (personal title) of Imola, achieved that requirement and was elected, receiving four more than the required two-thirds majority. It is reported by papal historian Valérie Pirie that, on the same ballot where he was elected, Mastai-Ferretti was one of the scrutineers formally tabulating the votes and that he became emotional as it became apparent that he would be elected. Mastai-Ferretti at one point begged to be excused from his role as scrutineer but was not permitted to do so, since it would have invalidated the ballot. As a result, Mastai-Ferretti had the rare experience of having to formally proclaim his own election to the cardinal-electors inside the conclave. He took the name Pius IX (known also as Pio Nono).

Because it was night, no formal announcement was given, just the signal of white smoke. Many Catholics had assumed that Gizzi had been elected successor of St. Peter. In fact, celebrations began to take place in his hometown, and his personal staff, following a long-standing tradition, burned his cardinalitial vestments. On the following morning, the Senior Cardinal-Deacon, Tommaso Riario Sforza, announced the election of Mastai-Ferretti before a crowd of faithful Catholics. When the new pope appeared on the balcony, the mood became joyous. After his election, Pius IX appointed Cardinal Gizzi as his secretary of state. Pius IX was crowned on 21 June 1846.

== Veto attempt ==
As with other conclaves up to and including the 1903 conclave, various Catholic monarchs claimed a right to veto a cardinal who might be elected, forcing the cardinals to pick someone else. Emperor Ferdinand of Austria had charged Cardinal Karl Kajetan Gaisruck, the Archbishop of Milan (then part of the empire's territory), with vetoing the liberal Mastai-Ferretti. However, Gaisruck arrived too late at the conclave. By the time he got there, Mastai-Ferretti had been elected, had accepted the papacy, and had been proclaimed publicly. (Note: According to Salvador Miranda, Eugenio Cazzani claims that the allegation of Gaisruck bringing the Austrian Emperor's veto against Cardinal Mastai-Ferretti is a rumor that has not been historically proven.)

== Aftermath ==
Pope Pius IX was crowned with the papal tiara on 21 June 1846. He became the longest-reigning pope since Saint Peter, sitting on the papal throne for nearly 32 years. Initially a liberal, following a short-lived deposition and the proclamation of the Roman Republic, Pius was returned to power by troops from the French Second Republic and became a conservative reactionary.

In 1870, the remaining territories of the Papal States were seized by Victor Emmanuel II, King of Italy. Rome became the capital of the Kingdom of Italy, with the former papal palace, the Quirinal, becoming the king's palace. Pius IX withdrew in protest to the Vatican, where he lived as a self-proclaimed "prisoner in the Vatican." He died in 1878.

== Participants ==
Cardinal electors by region
Region	Number
Italy	49
Rest of Europe	1
North America	0
South America	0
Asia	0
Oceania	0
Africa	0
Total	50

- Dates: 14–16 June 1846
- Location: Quirinal Palace, Rome
- Absent:
  - Carlo Gaetano Gaisruck, Archbishop of Milan, Austria
  - Giacomo Monico, Patriarch of Venice, Austria
  - Friedrich zu Schwarzenberg, Archbishop of Salzburg, Austria
  - Francisco Javier de Cienfuegos y Jovellanos, Archbishop of Seville, Spain
  - Guilherme Henriques de Carvalho, Patriarch of Lisbon, Portugal
  - Engelbert Sterckx, Archbishop of Mechelen, Belgium
  - Joseph Bernet, Archbishop of Aix, France
  - Hugues de La Tour d'Auvergne-Lauraguais, Bishop of Arras, France
  - Placido Maria Tadini, Archbishop of Genoa, Sardinia
  - Francesco Villadecani, Archbishop of Messina, the Two Sicilies
  - Louis Jacques Maurice de Bonald, Archbishop of Lyon
  - Ignazio Giovanni Cadolini, titular archbishop of Edessa
- Present:
  - Ludovico Micara, Dean of the College of Cardinals
  - Vincenzo Macchi, Cardinal-Bishop of Porto e Santa Rufina, Secretary of the Roman and Universal Inquisition
  - Carlo Oppizzoni, Archbishop of Bologna, Papal States, cardinal protopriest
  - Giacomo Filippo Fransoni, Prefect of the Congregation for the Evangelization of Peoples
  - Sisto Riario Sforza, Archbishop of Naples, the Two Sicilies
  - Pietro Ostini, Cardinal Bishop of Albano
  - Costantino Patrizi Naro, Vicar General of Rome, Papal States
  - Luigi Lambruschini, Cardinal Bishop of Sabina
  - Mario Mattei, Cardinal Bishop of Frascati
  - Castruccio Castracane degli Antelminelli, Cardinal Bishop of Palestrina
  - Benedetto Barberini, Archpriest of the Basilica of St. John Lateran
  - Francesco Serra Casano, Cardinal Priest of Santi Apostoli
  - Ugo Pietro Spinola, Pro-Datary of the Apostolic Dataria
  - Giacomo Luigi Brignole, Cardinal Priest of San Giovanni a Porta Latina
  - Paolo Polidori, Prefect of the Sacred Congregation of the Council, Titular archbishop of Tarsus
  - Giuseppe Alberghini, Cardinal Priest of Santa Prisca
  - Ambrogio Bianchi, Cardinal Priest of San Gregorio Magno al Celio
  - Gabriele della Genga Sermattei, Papal Legate of Urbino e Pesaro
  - Luigi Amat di San Filippo e Sorso, Prefect of the Sacred Congregation for the Propagation of the Faith
  - Angelo Mai, Cardinal Priest of Sant'Anastasia al Palatino
  - Chiarissimo Falconieri Mellini, Archbishop of Ravenna, Papal States
  - Giovanni Soglia Ceroni, Bishop of Osimo, Papal States
  - Antonio Francesco Orioli, Cardinal Priest of Santa Maria sopra Minerva
  - Giuseppe Caspar Mezzofanti, Cardinal Priest of Sant'Onofrio
  - Antonio Tosti, Cardinal Priest of San Pietro in Montorio
  - Filippo de Angelis, Archbishop of Fermo, Papal States
  - Gabriele Ferretti, Cardinal Priest of Santi Quirico e Giulitta
  - Charles Januarius Acton, Cardinal Priest of Santa Maria della Pace
  - Ferdinando Maria Pignatelli, Cardinal Priest of Santa Maria della Vittoria
  - Giovanni Mastai-Ferretti, Bishop of Imola, Papal States
  - Gaspare Bernardo Pianetti, Cardinal Priest of San Sisto Vecchio
  - Luigi Vannicelli Casoni, Cardinal Priest of San Callisto
  - Tommaso Pasquale Gizzi, Papal Legate of Forlì
  - Lodovico Altieri, Cardinal Priest of Santa Maria in Campitelli
  - Cosimo Corsi, Bishop of Jesi, Papal States
  - Antonio Maria Cadolini, Cardinal Priest of San Clemente al Laterano
  - Antonio Maria Cagiano de Azevedo, Bishop of Senigallia, Papal States
  - Niccola Paracciani Clarelli, Cardinal Priest of San Pietro in Vincoli
  - Fabio Maria Asquini, Cardinal Priest of Santo Stefano al Monte Celio
  - Domenico Carafa della Spina di Traetto, Archbishop of Benevento
  - Giacomo Piccolomini, Cardinal Priest of Santa Balbina
  - Sisto Riario Sforza, Cardinal Priest of Santa Sabina
  - Lorenzo Simonetti, Cardinal Priest of San Lorenzo in Panisperna
  - Tommaso Bernetti, Vice Chancellor of the Holy Roman Church
  - Ludovico Gazzoli, Cardinal-Deacon of Sant'Eustachio
  - Adriano Fieschi, Cardinal-Deacon of Santa Maria ad Martyres
  - Luigi Ciacchi, Cardinal-Deacon of Sant'Angelo in Pescheria
  - Giuseppe Ugolini, Papal Legate of Ferrara
  - Francesco Saverio Massimo, Cardinal-Deacon of Santa Maria in Domnica
  - Giovanni Serafini, Cardinal-Deacon of Santa Maria in Cosmedin
- Historic features:
  - last of four conclaves held in the Quirinal Palace and last held outside the Vatican
  - election of pope who would have the second-longest reign in papal history
  - last conclave held during the existence of the Papal States
  - apparent victory for liberals and apparent rejection of previous pope's policies
  - possible failed attempt by Austrian emperor to exercise a veto
  - last conclave made up exclusively of cardinals from continental Europe
