= Orthosias =

Orthosias may refer to:

- Orthosias in Caria
- Orthosias in Phoenicia
