= Luigi Vannicelli Casoni =

Italian Catholic cardinal (1801–1877)

His Eminence Luigi Vannicelli Casoni
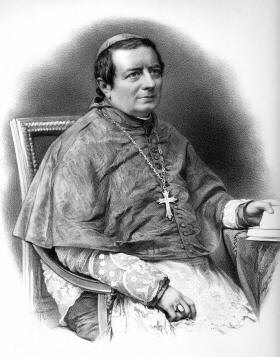
- Church: Catholic Church

Orders
- Consecration: 20 May 1850 by Pope Pius IX
- Created cardinal: 23 December 1839 by Pope Gregory XVI

Personal details
- Born: 16 April 1801 Amelia, Umbria, Italy
- Died: 21 April 1877 (age 76) Rome, Italy

Luigi Vannicelli Casoni (16 April 1801 – 21 April 1877) was an Italian Catholic cardinal.

== Biography ==
Vanicelli attended the seminary in Terni and then studied theology with the Lazarists in Rome. He was ordained a priest on 18 December 1829 and immediately elevated to Papal domestic prelate and canon of St. Peter's Basilica. After this he fulfilled various functions within the Roman Curia. In all these functions he was mainly responsible for the management and administration of the possessions of the Papal States. He exercised the governorship in various places and in 1838 was promoted to Governor of Rome, vice-camerlengo and head of the ecclesiastical police.

Pope Gregory XVI created him – in pectore – Cardinal in 1839. In 1842 his creation was made public. He was given San Callisto as his titular church. In the meantime he continued to work for the administration of the Papal States. He exercised the administration of Forlì and Bologna successively.
Cardinal Vanicelli participated in the Conclave of 1846 that led to the election of Pope Pius IX. He opted for the rank of Cardinal-priest shortly afterwards and - on that occasion - received Santa Prassede as his titular church.

Between 1849 and 1850, after the suppression of the revolutionary Roman Republic of 1849, he formed together with the Cardinals Gabriele della Genga Sermattei and Lodovico Altieri, a so-called Commissione governata di Stato, which took charge of the government of the Papal States, while the Pope himself lived in exile in Gaeta. This commission, called the Red Triumvirate by contemporaries, immediately took the measures that Pius IX desired: every form of liberalization within the politics of the Papal States was reversed and certain freedoms, including that of the freedom of the press, were severely restricted. The judiciary was also tightened and the Inquisition was reintroduced.

In 1850 he became Archbishop of Ferrara-Comacchio. Pope Pius IX himself consecrated him Archbishop. Cardinal Vanicelli participated in the First Vatican Council, where the doctrine of Papal infallibility was established.

He died from respiratory problems in 1877 and was buried in the Santi Vincenzo e Anastasio a Trevi in Rome.

== Sources ==
- Vannicèlli Casóni, Luigi, in Treccani.it – Enciclopedie on line, Istituto dell'Enciclopedia Italiana.
- Luca Sandoni, VANNICELLI CASONI, Luigi, in Dizionario biografico degli italiani, vol. 98, Istituto dell'Enciclopedia Italiana, 2020.
- David M. Cheney, Luigi Vannicelli Casoni, in Catholic Hierarchy.
- Salvador Miranda, VANNICELLI CASONI, Luigi, on fiu.edu – The Cardinals of the Holy Roman Church, Florida International University
