= Lodovico Altieri =

Italian Roman Catholic cardinal

Venerable Ludovico Altieri
- Camerlengo of the Holy Roman Church
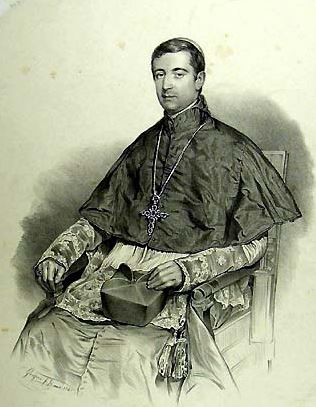
- Church: Roman Catholic Church
- Appointed: 19 March 1857
- Term ended: 11 August 1867
- Predecessor: Tommaso Riario Sforza
- Successor: Filippo de Angelis
- Other posts: Cardinal-Bishop of Albano (1860–67); Prefect of the Congregation of the Index (1861–67); Archpriest of the Basilica of Saint John Lateran (1863–67)
- Previous posts: Titular Archbishop of Ephesus (1836–45); Apostolic Nuncio to Austria (1836–45); Cardinal-Priest of Santa Maria in Campitelli (1845–60)

Orders
- Ordination: 24 March 1833 by Costantino Patrizi Naro
- Consecration: 17 July 1836 by Pope Gregory XVI
- Created cardinal: 14 December 1840 (in pectore); 21 April 1845 (announced); by Pope Gregory XVI
- Rank: Cardinal-Priest (1845–60); Cardinal-Bishop (1860–67)

Personal details
- Born: Ludovico Altieri; 17 July 1805 Rome, Papal States
- Died: 11 August 1867 (aged 62) Albano Laziale, Rome, Papal States

Ordination history of Lodovico Altieri
History
Priestly ordination
- Ordained by: Costantino Patrizi Naro
Episcopal consecration
- Principal consecrator: Pope Gregory XVI
- Co-consecrators: Giovanni Soglia Ceroni; Giovanni Giacomo Sinibaldi
Cardinalate
- Elevated by: Pope Gregory XVI
Episcopal succession
Bishops consecrated by Lodovico Altieri as principal consecrator
- Juraj Haulík Váralyai: 10 December 1837
- Luigi Guglielmi: 10 May 1840
- Gregorio Fistilli: 7 December 1845
- Giovanni Corti: 25 April 1847
- Francesco Emilio Cugini: 28 March 1852
- Gaetano Bedini: 4 July 1852
- Giuseppe Cardoni: 7 November 1852
- Giovanni Francesco Magnani: 14 October 1855
- Nicola Pace: 14 October 1855
- Pietro Maria Ferrè: 29 March 1857
- José Ignacio Checa y Barba: 29 December 1861
- Luigi Oreglia di Santo Stefano: 13 May 1866
- Antonio Rossi Vaccari: 1 June 1866
- Antonius Grech-Delicata-Testaferrata: 14 July 1867

Lodovico Altieri (17 July 1805 – 11 August 1867) was an Italian Roman Catholic cardinal. He served in various capacities under various popes and belonged to a noble Roman house making him a descendant of Pope Clement X.

The beatification process commenced under Pope Benedict XVI and Altieri has been titled as a Servant of God.

== Life ==
Lodovico Altieri was born in Rome in 1805 as the last of three children to Don Paluzzo, Prince Altieri, 5th Prince of Oriolo and Viano, etc (Rome, 31 July 1760 - Rome, 10 January 1834) and wife (15 October 1793) Maria Anna Violente Katharina Martha Xaveria, Countess of Lusatia (Siena, 20 October 1770 - Rome, 24 December 1845), daughter of Prince Francis Xavier of Saxony and wife Maria Chiara Spinucci. His two older siblings were Clemente, Prince Altieri, 6th Prince of Oriolo and Viano, etc (Rome, 6 August 1795 - Rome, 21 June 1873), and Augusto (9 May 1797 - 12 October 1860), who became a Jesuit. His father served from 1801 until his death as the commander for the Papal Noble Guard after Pope Pius VII named him to that position. His brother Clemente succeeded their father in that role. He was baptized in the parish of San Marco mere moments after his birth.

He was ordained to the priesthood in Rome on 24 March 1833.

He was named after his ordination as the qualificator for the Congregation of the Inquisition while he served as the vicar for the Santa Maria in Via Lata school. During this time he also served as the aide for the Congregation of Studies. His rise through the ranks continued after he was appointed as the Titular Archbishop of Ephesus; he received his episcopal consecration from the pope himself in Saint Peter's Basilica. The co-consecrators were Giovanni Soglia Ceroni and Giovanni Giacomo Sinibaldi.

He was also appointed as the apostolic nuncio to Austria just after his consecration. His aide in the nunciature was the future cardinal Gaetano Bedini. It was he who encouraged Bedini to expose himself to the Church's diplomatic atmosphere.

The pope created him as a cardinal but reserved him in pectore on 14 December 1840. His name was not announced until 21 April 1845 and he was made the Cardinal-Priest of Santa Maria in Campitelli (the diaconate was elevated pro hac vice to a titular rank).

He participated in the conclave in 1846 that elected Pope Pius IX. In that conclave he supported the candidature of Cardinal Mastai-Ferretti which formed a knit group among cardinals such as Clarissimo Falconieri Mellini and Luigi Amat di San Filippo e Sorso. The disorder in 1848 saw Altieri flee with Pius IX to Gaeta. Pius IX held Altieri in great esteem and Altieri proved himself the center of opposition within the cardinalate to Giacomo Antonelli. Altieri was a member of the Red Triumvirate that governed Rome between 1849 and 1850 after the short-lived Roman Republic together with cardinals Luigi Vannicelli Casoni and Gabriele Sermattei della Genga.

He was the aide for the Congregation for Memorials from 1855 to 1857 and was later appointed Camerlengo of the Holy Roman Church on 19 March 1857; the cardinal held that position until his death. He later opted for the order of Cardinal-Bishops and assumed the suburbicarian see of Albano on 17 December 1860. He was later appointed as the Prefect of the Congregation of the Index on 5 September 1861 and then appointed as the archpriest for the Basilica of Saint John Lateran on 8 March 1863. Altieri had little interactions with Giovanni Bosco and once sent him in 1867 funds for Bosco's apostolic work in Turin.

During the cholera epidemic that affected his suburbicarian see he assisted and tended to the ill though contracted it himself and died of it later on 11 August 1867. His funeral took place in Santa Maria in Campitelli and his remains were interred in Campo Verano before being transferred.

== Beatification process ==
The beatification process commenced under Pope Benedict XVI once the Congregation for the Causes of Saints issued the nihil obstat ("no objections") and titled him as a Servant of God on 14 March 2009. The diocesan process of the investigation was inaugurated in Albano on 22 November 2009 and concluded its investigations later on 26 September 2015.

On March 23, 2026, the Vatican announced Pope Leo XIV advanced Altieri and five others toward beatifictaion, granting the candidates the title of a Venerable. The postulator for this cause is Ulderico Parente.

== See also ==
- Altieri family

Diplomatic posts
| Preceded by Pietro Ostini | Apostolic Nuncio to Austria; 18 July 1836 – 21 April 1845 | Succeeded by Michele Viale-Prelà |
Catholic Church titles
| Preceded by Giovanni Soglia Ceroni | Titular Archbishop of Ephesus; 11 July 1836 – 21 April 1845 | Succeeded by Alessandro Asinari di Sanmarzano |
| Preceded by Adriano Fieschi | Cardinal-Deacon of Santa Maria in Campitelli; 21 April 1845 – 24 November 1845 | Succeeded by Himself |
| Preceded by Himself | Cardinal-Priest pro hac vice of Santa Maria in Campitelli; 24 November 1845 – 17 December 1860 | Succeeded by Francesco Pentini |
| Preceded by Tommaso Riario Sforza | Camerlengo of the Holy Roman Church; 19 March 1857 – 11 August 1867 | Succeeded by Filippo de Angelis |
| Preceded by Costantino Patrizi Naro | Cardinal-Bishop of Albano; 17 December 1860 – 11 August 1867 | Succeeded by Camillo di Pietro |
| Preceded by Girolamo D’Andrea | Prefect of the Congregation of the Index; 5 September 1861 – 11 August 1867 | Succeeded by Antonio Saverio De Luca |
| Preceded by Benedetto Colonna Barberini di Sciarra | Archpriest of the Basilica of St. John Lateran; 8 March 1863 – 11 August 1867 | Succeeded by Costantino Patrizi Naro |
