= Council of Three =

Council of Three may refer to:

- Rada Trzech - a collective president of the Polish Government in Exile (1939-1990)
- Council of Three (Czech resistance) (1942-1945) – an underground organisation uniting most partisan units in the Protectorate of Bohemia and Moravia
- Iraqi Council of Three - a collective president of Iraq chosen after the 1958 revolution
- Sanshikan, the legislature of the Ryūkyū Kingdom

== See also ==
- Triumvirate
