= Red Triumvirate =

Government of the Papal States, 1849–1850

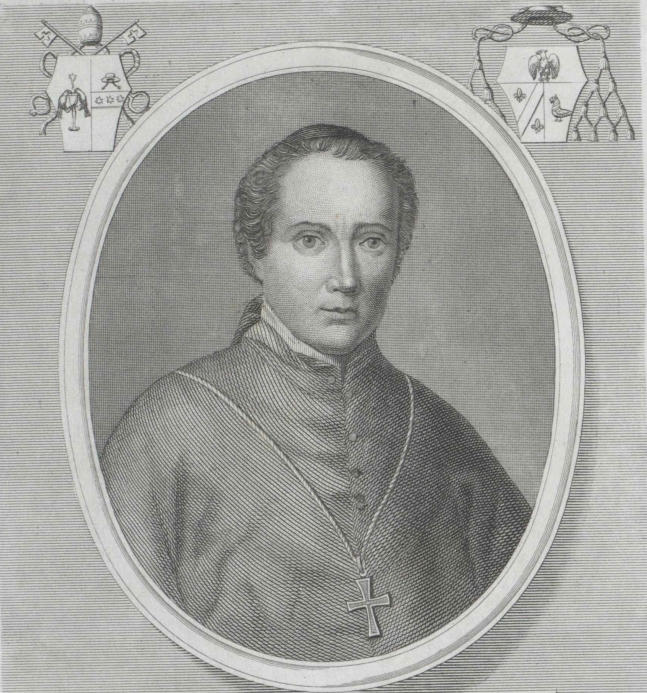
Gabriele della Genga

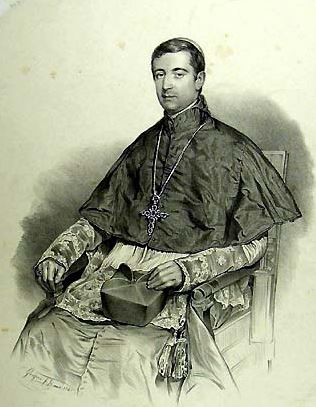
Lodovico Altieri

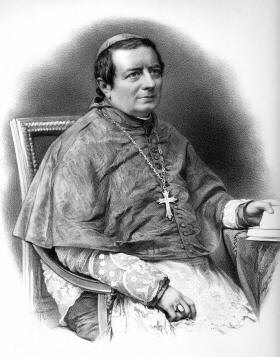
Luigi Vannicelli Casoni

The Red Triumvirate (Italian: Triumvirato rosso), formally the Governing Commission of the State (Commissione governativa di Stato), was a group of three cardinals who governed the Papal States after the suppression of the revolutionary Roman Republic of 1849, from 1 August 1849 until the return of Pope Pius IX from Gaeta on 12 April 1850. Its members, named by the pope on 21 July 1849, were Gabriele della Genga Sermattei, Lodovico Altieri, and Luigi Vannicelli Casoni. The popular title "Red Triumvirate" contrasted them with the triumvirate of Armellini, Mazzini, and Saffi that had ruled the republic, and referred to both the colour of the robes worn by cardinals and their purportedly bloody persecution of their opponents.

== History ==
=== Restoration of absolutism ===
The Red Triumvirate took charge of Rome on 1 August 1849 from General Charles Oudinot, who had led the French occupation of the city since 3 July. The triumvirate's government had a very conservative character: one foreign diplomat termed it a return, "openly and without reserve, to the old system of unqualified absolutism". Its first decree, given on 2 August 1849, annulled every law and regulation that had been enacted in Rome since 16 November 1848. This entailed the restoration of capital punishment and the Roman Inquisition, as well as the rescinding of civil rights granted to Jews under the republic. The currency of the republic, the Roman scudo, was significantly devalued, and bonds issued by the republic were publicly burned.

The triumvirs oversaw a campaign of reprisals against both partisans of the republic and other perceived opponents. All government employees who had been hired since 16 November 1848 were dismissed, and a Council of Censure was constituted to investigate those hired previously who had remained to serve the republic, subjecting many functionaries otherwise loyal to the pope to interrogations over their "lack of fervour". A special Court of Inquiry was also established to identify and arrest critics of the papal government, many of whom would spend lengthy periods in prison without charge. Others were forced to leave the Papal States. This persecution extended even to figures such as Terenzio, Count Mamiani della Rovere who had supported the papacy during the republic but were perceived to be overly liberal: Mamiani's papers were seized by the Inquisition and he was pressured into exile. In all, several thousand people were exiled or dismissed from office, including not just republicans but various constitutionalists, moderates, and political independents.

=== Council of Ministers ===
The triumvirate established a Council of Ministers with five members to oversee the day-to-day administration: four of these were laymen, but the one cleric, Domenico Savelli, held preponderant power as interior minister.

Council of Ministers of the Papal States
Portfolio	Minister
Minister of the Interior and Police	Monsignor Domenico Savelli
Minister of War	Prince Domenico Orsini
MInister of Finance	Angelo Galli
Minister of Grace and Justice	Angelo Giansanti
Minister of Agriculture, Commerce, Industry, Public Works, and Fine Arts	Camillo Jacobini

=== French opposition ===
The measures of the Red Triumvirate provoked consternation in the French Second Republic, the armies of which had restored, and now protected, the ecclesiastical government in Rome. On 18 August 1849, not long after the triumvirate's assumption of power, the French president Louis-Napoléon Bonaparte dispatched a letter to Colonel Edgar Ney in Rome protesting that the French army had been sent to preserve liberty in Rome, not destroy it. Upon receiving Bonaparte's letter, the triumvirate threatened to withdraw from Rome—Oudinot's successor as the French commander in the city, Louis de Rostolan, also refused to circulate it, perceiving it as a challenge to his own authority. On 18 September, however, the triumvirate made a partial concession to French opinion by offering an amnesty to most of those involved with the republic, except for the members of its government and legislative assembly, as well as those who had benefited from a previous amnesty in 1846. Nevertheless, most of its measures remained intact: the triumvirate maintained its revocation of rights from Jews despite entreaties from James de Rothschild.

=== Legacy ===
The Red Triumvirate dissolved upon the pope's arrival in Rome on 12 April 1850, and the administration was taken up by Cardinal Secretary of State Giacomo Antonelli. The hardline policies of the triumvirate significantly increased the opposition to the papal government among the Roman nobility and the lower ranks of the clergy.
