= Gaspare Bernardo Pianetti =

Roman Catholic cardinal (1780 – 1862)

His Eminence Gaspare Bernardo Pianetti
- Camerlengo for the College of Cardinals
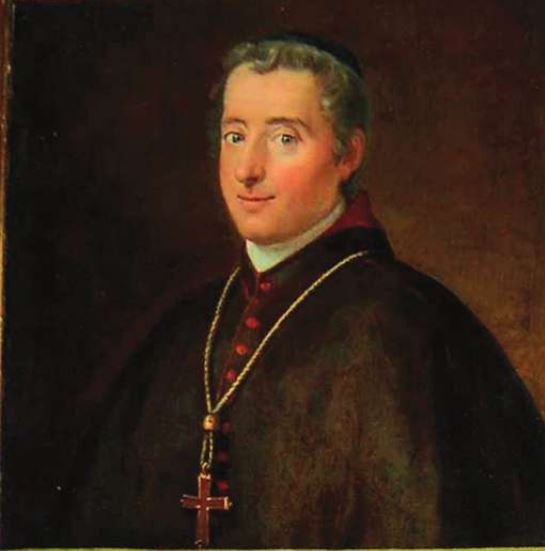
- Church: Roman Catholic Church
- Appointed: 18 March 1861
- Term ended: 30 January 1862
- Predecessor: Antonio Tosti
- Successor: Fabio Maria Asquini
- Other post: Cardinal-Priest of San Sisto (1840–62)
- Previous posts: Bishop of Tuscanella (1826–61); Bishop of Viterbo (1826–61)

Orders
- Ordination: 31 March 1804
- Consecration: 15 August 1826 by Pope Leo XII
- Created cardinal: 23 December 1839 (in pectore); 14 December 1840 (revealed) by Pope Gregory XVI
- Rank: Cardinal-Priest

Personal details
- Born: Gaspare Bernardo Pianetti; 7 February 1780 Iesi, Papal States
- Died: 30 January 1862 (aged 81) Rome, Papal States
- Buried: San Salvatore in Lauro
- Parents: Angelo Pianetti; Eleonora Buonaccorsi
- Education: University of Macerata; Pontifical Academy of Ecclesiastical Nobles

Gaspare Bernardo Pianetti (7 February 1780 – 30 January 1862) was a Catholic Cardinal, Bishop of Viterbo e Tuscania and Camerlengo of the Sacred College of Cardinals.

== Personal life ==
Pianetti was born on 7 February 1780 in Jesi, Italy.

He was educated at the Collegio Nazareno, the University of Macerata (where he received a doctorate in utroque iuris, both civil and canon law) and finally at the Pontifical Academy of Ecclesiastical Nobles.

== Priesthood ==
Pianetti was ordained as a Priest on 31 March 1804. He was elected bishop of Viterbo e Tuscania in 1826 and was consecrated that same year by Pope Leo XII. He served as Bishop of Viterbo for almost 35 years until his retirement in 1861 at the age of 81.

He was appointed Vice-governor of Rome on three occasions and was appointed Auditor of the Sacred Roman Rota.

== Cardinalate ==
Pianetti was elevated to Cardinal (in pectore) in 1839 and was formally revealed as a Cardinal in 1840.

He participated in the Papal Conclave of 1846, which elected Pope Pius IX.

He was appointed Camerlengo of the Sacred College of Cardinals from 1861 to 1862 and was Grand chancellor of the Pontifical Equestrian Orders.

== Death and burial ==
Pianetti died on 30 January 1862, aged 82, in Rome and was buried, according to his will, in the church of San Salvatore in Lauro.

== See also ==
- College of Cardinals

Catholic Church titles
Preceded by Antonio Tosti	Camerlengo of the Sacred College of Cardinals; 1861–1862	Succeeded by Fabio Maria Asquini
