= Louis de Rostolan =

French general and politician

- Born: 31 July 1791; Aix-en-Provence
- Died: 2 December 1862; Puyricard
- Awards: Légion d'honneur (Grand-croix)

Louis de Rostolan (31 July 1791 – 2 December 1862) was a French general and politician, titled Papal Count by writ of 7 September 1855 and named Grand Cross of the Legion of Honour in 1856.

== Biography ==
The son of Louis Hyacinthe Elzéar Rostolan, president treasurer of France at the finance office of Aix, and Thérèse Polixène Fournier, he was born in Aix-en-Provence on 31 July 1791 under the surname "Rostolan". He was authorised by a judgement of the Civil Court of Aix on 10 February 1860 to change his name to "de Rostolan".

A student at Saint-Cyr, he left in 1810 for the infantry. He served in Spain under Napoleon Bonaparte. Sent with the Hundred Thousand Sons of Saint Louis in 1823, he fought in its campaigns until the battle of Toulouse and was wounded at Saguntum.

Under the Bourbon Restoration in France, he was at the battle of Trocadero as a captain, and became a battalion commander shortly afterwards. Promoted to colonel in 1832 and marshal of camp in 1839, he was appointed commandant of the École Polytechnique in 1844 until 1847.

Made lieutenant general in 1846, he was dismissed after the French Revolution of 1848 and compulsorily retired. He was then reinstated and appointed commander of the Hérault department in Occitania by the prince-president Louis-Napoleon. He was appointed governor of Rome on 7 August 1849 by Marshal Oudinot after the capture of the city by French troops.

He was appointed senator on 31 December 1852. He was made a Grand Officer of the Legion of Honour on 30 April 1849.

== Decorations ==
- Roman hereditary count by pontifical brief of 7 September 1855, authorised on a personal basis in France by imperial decree of 21 June 1859. F. de Saint-Simon and E. de Séréville write: "Died in 1862 without posterity, the general, according to the brief, could transmit his title to his nephew Marie-Mitre-Balthazar de Rostolan, but on a personal basis only".
- Knight of the Order of Saint Louis
- Grand Cross of the Legion of Honour (1856)
- Grand Cross of the Order of Pius IX
- Knight of the Order of Saint George of the Two Sicilies
- Grand-officier de l'ordre du Nichan El-Anouar
- Commander First Class of the Military Order of the Tower and Sword
- Commander of the Order of Saints Maurice and Lazarus
- Commander of the Order of the Medjidie
- Titulaire de la Médaille militaire.

== Sources ==
- Rostolan (Louis, comte de) », dans Adolphe Robert et Gaston Cougny, Dictionnaire des parlementaires français, Edgar Bourloton, 1889-1891
- Louis Gabriel Michaud, Biographie universelle, 1842
- Francis Choisel, Dictionnaire du Second Empire, 1996
