= Ugo Pietro Spinola =

His Eminence Ugo Pietro Spinola
- Pro-Datary of the Apostolic Dataria
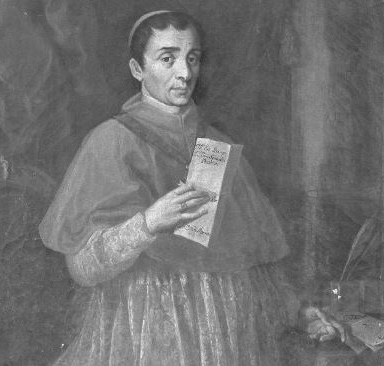
- Church: Roman Catholic Church
- Appointed: 29 April 1844
- Term ended: 21 January 1858
- Predecessor: Bartolomeo Pacca
- Successor: Mario Mattei
- Other posts: Cardinal-Priest of Santi Silvestro e Martino ai Monti (1832–58); Camerlengo for the College of Cardinals (1857–58)
- Previous posts: Titular Archbishop of Thebae (1826–32); Apostolic Nuncio to Austria-Hungary (1826–32)

Orders
- Ordination: 23 December 1815
- Consecration: 12 November 1826 by Giuseppe Maria Spina
- Created cardinal: 30 September 1831 (in pectore); 2 July 1832 (revealed) by Pope Gregory XVI
- Rank: Cardinal-Priest

Personal details
- Born: Ugo Pietro Spinola; 29 June 1791 Genoa, Kingdom of Sardinia
- Died: 21 January 1858 (aged 66) Rome, Papal States
- Buried: Santi Silvestro e Martino ai Monti
- Parents: Francesco Maria Spinola; Eugenia Pallavicini

Ugo Pietro Spinola (29 June 1791 – 21 January 1858) was a Catholic cardinal and was Apostolic Nuncio to Austria and camerlengo of the Sacred College of Cardinals.

== Early life ==
Spinola was born on 29 June 1791 in Genoa.

He was educated at the Collegio dei Protonotari in Rome where he received a doctorate in utroque iuris (both civil and canon law) in 1814).

== Priesthood ==
He was ordained on 23 December 1815 and was named a papal delegate (diplomat) to various cities including:

- 1816 - Ascoli
- 1818 - Viterbo and Perugia
- 1823 - Macerata
- 1825 - Macerata and Camerino

He was elected titular archbishop of Thebae in 1826 and Apostolic Nuncio to Austria between 1826 and 1832.

== Cardinalate ==
In 1832 Spinola was revealed as a cardinal, having been elevated to cardinal (in pectore) in 1831. He was appointed Abbot commendatario of Subiaco in 1838 and held this position until 1842. He participated in the Papal Conclave of 1846 which elected Pope Pius IX. Between 1857 and 1858 he held the post of camerlengo of the Sacred College of Cardinals.

He died on 21 January 1858 in Rome. (Note: some records indicate he may have died on either 23 or 24 January 1858)

== See also ==
- College of Cardinals

Catholic Church titles
Preceded by Benedetto Barberini	Camerlengo of the Sacred College of Cardinals; 1857–1858	Succeeded by Gabriele della Genga Sermattei
