= Antonio Francesco Orioli =

His Eminence Antonio Francesco Orioli O.F.M. Conv.
- Prefect of the Congregation of Bishops and Regulars
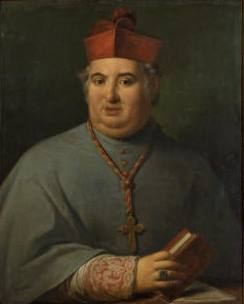
- Church: Roman Catholic Church
- Appointed: 2 May 1847
- Term ended: 20 February 1852
- Predecessor: Pietro Ostini
- Successor: Gabriele della Genga Sermattei
- Other post: Cardinal-Priest of Santi XII Apostoli (1850-52)
- Previous posts: Vicar General of the Order of Friars Minor Conventual (1832-33); Bishop of Orvieto (1833-41); Cardinal-Priest of Santa Maria sopra Minerva (1838-50)

Orders
- Consecration: 1 May 1833 by Giacinto Placido Zurla
- Created cardinal: 12 February 1838 by Pope Gregory XVI
- Rank: Cardinal-Priest

Personal details
- Born: Antonio Francesco Orioli; 10 December 1778 Bagnacavallo, Papal States
- Died: 20 February 1852 (aged 73) Rome, Papal States
- Buried: Santi XII Apostoli
- Parents: Bernardo Orioli; Teresa Alberti

Antonio Francesco Orioli O.F.M.Conv. (10 December 1778 in Bagnacavallo, Faenza in Italy – 20 February 1852 in Rome) was a cardinal of the Catholic Church.

== Biography ==
Orioli joined the Order of the Friars Minor Conventuals (a branch of the Franciscans). He professed on 6 May 1793 at the convent of Bologna. He was educated at the Franciscan colleges of Bologna and Parma, and St. Bonaventure College in Rome. In 1804 he received a doctorate in arts and theology.

From 1807 to 1809, Orioli was Lector of theology at St. Bonaventure College in Rome. He moved to France in 1809, returning to Italy in 1812. Here he became a professor at St. Bonaventure College in 1817.

He was also definitor general of his order and consultor of the S.C. of the Index. He was an examiner of the Roman Clergy for the promotion to academic chairs. On 4 September 1832, he became vicar general of his order.

On 15 April 1833, Orioli was elected bishop of Orvieto, being consecrated by Cardinal Giacinto Placido Zurla on 1 May that year. He served at the basilica of Ss. XII Apostoli in Rome. Cardinal Zurla was assisted by Giovanni Soglia, titular archbishop of Efeso, and by Alessandro Bernetti, bishop of Recanati.

He was made cardinal in February 1838 by Pope Gregory XVI. He received the red hat and the title of S. Maria sopra Minerva on 15 February 1838. In December 1841, he resigned pastoral government of the diocese. He participated in the conclave of 1846 to elect Pope Pius IX. Orioli became prefect of the S.C. of Bishops and Regulars on 2 May 1847. From 5 May to 4 June 1848, he served as Secretary of State ad interim.

He opted for the title of Ss. XII Apostoli on 30 September 1850.

Orioli died in Rome. He was exposed and buried in the church of Ss. XII Apostoli. Pope Pius IX participated in his funeral.

== Timeline ==
- 10 Dec 1778 Born in Bagnacavallo
- 15 Apr 1833 Appointed Bishop of Orvieto, Italy
- 1 May 1833 Ordained Bishop of Orvieto, Italy
- 12 Feb 1838 Elevated to Cardinal
- 12 Feb 1838 Appointed Cardinal - Priest of Santa Maria sopra Minerva
- 18 Dec 1841 Resigned as Bishop of Orvieto, Italy
- 2 May 1847 Appointed Prefect of the Congregation of Bishops and Regulars
- 30 Sep 1850 Appointed Cardinal - Priest of Ss XII Apostoli
- 20 Feb 1852 Died while Prefect of the Congregation of Bishops and Regulars
