= Ignazio Giovanni Cadolini =

Roman cardinal

Cardinal Ignazio Giovanni Cadolini
- Cardinal-Bishop

Orders
- Ordination: 1826
- Created cardinal: January 27, 1843 by Pope Gregory XVI
- Rank: Cardinal Priest, then Cardinal Bishop

Personal details
- Born: 4 November 1794 Cremona, Italy
- Died: 11 April 1850 (aged 55) Ferrara, Italy
- Occupation: diplomat, administrator
- Profession: priest, bishop

Ignazio Giovanni Cadolini (04 November 1794 – 11 April 1850) was a 19th century Italian Roman Catholic Cardinal.

== Life ==
He was born on 04 November 1794 in Cremona, Italy.

His parents were Giovanni and Rosa Germani.

He died on 11 April 1850 in Ferrara, Italy.

== Education ==
He studied law at Bologna University.

== Career ==
He was elected Bishop of Cervia in 1826 and Archbishop of Spoleto in 1832.

He was appointed as the Apostolic Administrator of Foligno in 1833 and titular Archbishop of Edessa in Osroene.

He was appointed Secretary of the Congregation for the Propagation of the Faith in 1838 and elected Archbishop of Ferrara in 1843.

=== Cardinalate ===
Pope Gregory XVI created him cardinal during the consistory of January 27, 1843.

He did not participate in the 1846 Papal Conclave, during which Pope Pius IX was elected pope.
