= Francesco di Paola Villadecani =

Italian cardinal (1780–1861)

His Eminence Francesco di Paola Villadecani
- Archbishop of Messina
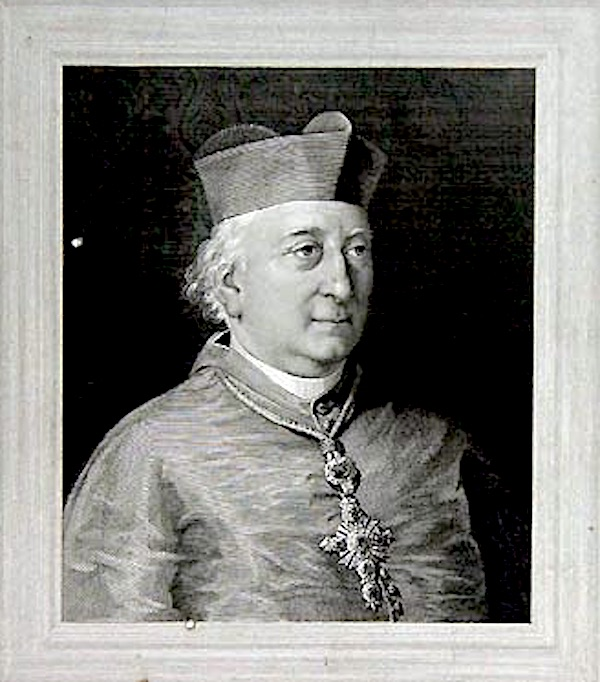
- Church: Roman Catholic Church
- Archdiocese: Messina
- See: Messina
- Appointed: 17 November 1823
- Term ended: 13 June 1861
- Predecessor: Antonio Maria Trigona
- Successor: Luigi Natoli
- Other post: Cardinal-Priest of Santi Bonifacio ed Alessio (1843-61)
- Previous post: Titular Bishop of Orthosia (1820-23)

Orders
- Ordination: 18 September 1802
- Consecration: 28 October 1820 by Silvestro Todaro
- Created cardinal: 27 January 1843 by Pope Gregory XVI
- Rank: Cardinal-Priest

Personal details
- Born: Francesco di Paola Villadecani; 22 February 1780 Messina, Kingdom of Naples
- Died: 13 June 1861 (aged 81) Messina, Kingdom of Italy
- Buried: Messina Cathedral

Francesco di Paola Villadecani (22 February 1780 – 13 June 1861) was a cardinal of the Catholic Church who was Archbishop of Messina from 1823 to 1861.

He was born on 22 February 1780 in Messina, Sicily, Italy. In 1820, he was named titular bishop of Orthosias in Caria. On 25 April 1823, he was elected Archbishop of Messina and his appointment was confirmed on 17 November.

Pope Gregory XVI elevated him to the rank of cardinal in the consistory of 27 January 1843, assigning him as Cardinal Priest to Santi Bonifacio ed Alessio.

In late 1857, due to possible dementia, an administrator, Giuseppe Maria Papardo, was appointed to manage the archdiocese for him.

He died in Messina on 13 [or 14] June 1861 at the age of 81, and was buried in the Cathedral of Messina, where his tomb can still be seen.
