= Giovanni Soglia Ceroni =

Italian cardinal

His Eminence Giovanni Soglia Ceroni
- Archbishop-Bishop of Cingoli; Archbishop-Bishop of Osimo
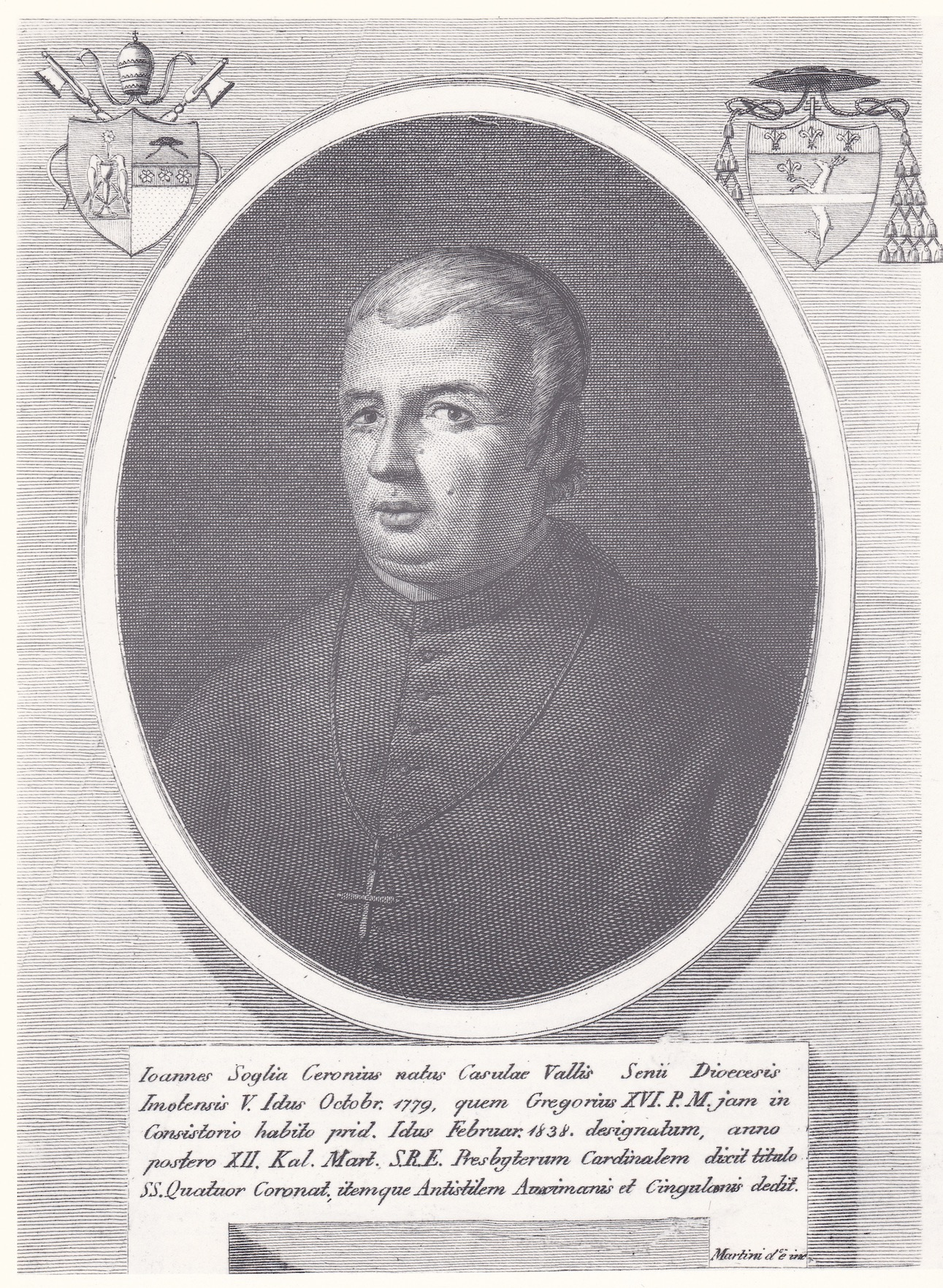
- Church: Roman Catholic Church
- Diocese: Cingoli; Osimo
- See: Cingoli; Osimo
- Appointed: 18 February 1839
- Term ended: 12 August 1856
- Predecessor: Giovanni Antonio Benvenuti
- Successor: Giovanni Brunelli
- Other post: Cardinal-Priest of Santi Quattro Coronati (1839–56)
- Previous posts: Titular Archbishop of Ephesus (1826–35); Patriarch of Constantinople (1835–39); Secretary of State (1848)

Orders
- Ordination: 1 January 1803
- Consecration: 22 October 1826 by Francesco Bertazzoli
- Created cardinal: 12 February 1838 (in pectore); 18 February 1839 (revealed) by Pope Gregory XVI
- Rank: Cardinal-Priest

Personal details
- Born: Giovanni Soglia Ceroni; 10 October 1779 Casola Valsenio, Imola, Papal States
- Died: 12 August 1856 (aged 76) Osimo, Papal States
- Buried: Osimo Cathedral
- Parents: Giovacchino Soglia; Ana Braga
- Education: Collegio Romano; La Sapienza University

Giovanni Soglia Ceroni (10 October 1779 – 12 August 1856) was an Italian cardinal of the Catholic Church.

== Biography ==
He was ordained a priest on 1 January 1803. appointed him Titular Bishop of Ephesus on 2 October 1826 and ordained a bishop on 22 October.

On 23 June 1834 he was appointed Secretary of the Congregation for Studies. On 6 April 1835, he was named Titular Patriarch of Constantinople.

Pope Gregory XVI made him a cardinal in pectore on 12 February 1838 and then announced publicly that he was Cardinal Priest of Santi Quattro Coronati at a papal consistory held on 21 February 1839. He participated in the papal conclave of 1846 that elected Pope Pius IX. He served as Secretary of State of the Holy See from 4 June 1848 until his resignation on 29 November of that year.

He died on 2 August 1856.
