= Clarissimo Falconieri Mellini =

Catholic cardinal

His Eminence Chiarissimo Falconieri Mellini
- Archbishop of Ravenna
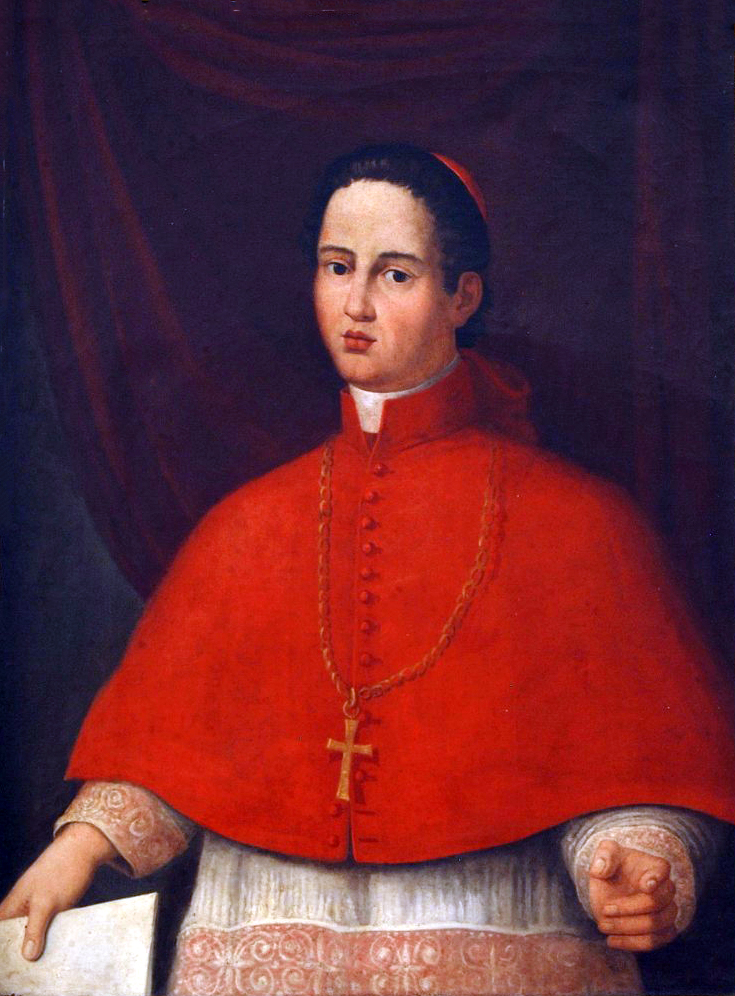
- Portrait.
- Church: Roman Catholic Church
- Archdiocese: Ravenna
- See: Ravenna
- Appointed: 3 July 1826
- Installed: 21 October 1826
- Term ended: 22 August 1859
- Predecessor: Antonio Codronchi
- Successor: Enrico Orfei
- Other post: Cardinal-Priest of San Marcello (1838–59)

Orders
- Ordination: 19 September 1818
- Consecration: 15 August 1826 by Pope Leo XII
- Created cardinal: 12 February 1838 by Pope Gregory XVI
- Rank: Cardinal-Priest

Personal details
- Born: Chiarissimo Falconieri Mellini; 25 September 1794 Rome, Papal States
- Died: 22 August 1859 (aged 64) Ravenna, Papal States
- Buried: Ravenna Cathedral
- Parents: Alessandro Falconieri Mellini; Marianna Lante Montefeltro della Rovere
- Education: Collegio Romano; La Sapienza University

Chiarissimo Falconieri Mellini (25 September 1794 – 22 August 1859) was a Catholic Cardinal and Camerlengo of the Sacred College of Cardinals.

== Early life and priesthood ==
Mellini was born on 25 September 1794 in Rome, the son of Marquis Alessandro Falconieri Mellini and Marianna Lante Montefeltro della Rovere, of the dukes of Bomarzo. He was a relative of Cardinals Lelio Falconieri (1643) and Alessandro Falconieri (1724). His great-great-grandfather was Duke Ippolito Lante Montefeltro della Rovere.

He was educated at the Collegio Tolomei in Siena, the Collegio Romano in Rome and the La Sapienza University in Rome where he received a doctorate in utroque iuris (both civil and canon law) in 1824. Mellini was ordained on 19 September 1818 and was named an Auditor of the Sacred Roman Rota.

== Episcopate and cardinalate ==
He was elected Archbishop of Ravenna and was consecrated in 1826 by Pope Leo XII.

Mellini was elevated to cardinal-priest in the consistory of 12 February 1838. He participated in the Papal Conclave of 1846 which elected Pope Pius IX and was made Secretary of Memorials in 1857. Mellini was appointed Camerlengo of the Sacred College of Cardinals in 1859.

== Death ==
Mellini died on 22 August 1859 at Ravenna and was exposed and buried in the Metropolitan Cathedral of Ravenna.

== See also ==
- Vatican
- College of Cardinals
- Catholic Church

Catholic Church titles
Preceded by Gabriele della Genga Sermattei	Camerlengo of the Sacred College of Cardinals; 1859	Succeeded by Antonio Tosti
