= Orthosia (Caria) =

Town of ancient Caria

Coordinates: 37°49′27″N 28°13′41″E

Orthosia (Ancient Greek: Ὀρθωσία) was a town of ancient Caria, inhabited during Hellenistic, Roman, and Byzantine times. It was not far from Alabanda, on the left bank of the Maeander River, and apparently on or near a hill of the same name.

Around 167 BC, the Mylasians and the Alabandians gathered an armed force and advanced toward Orthosia as part of their broader military actions in the area around Euromus. The Rhodians responded by sending troops under their commander Lycon. In the wider campaign, they defeated the Mylasians and Alabandians who had moved toward Orthosia.

It was the seat of a bishop from an early date, and, while no longer a residential bishopric, it remains under the name Orthosias in Caria a titular see of the Roman Catholic Church.

Its site is located near Yenipazar in Asiatic Turkey.
