= Gabriele della Genga Sermattei =

Italian cardinal (1801–1861)

His Eminence Gabriele della Genga Sermattei
- Prefect Emeritus of the Congregation for Bishops and Regulars
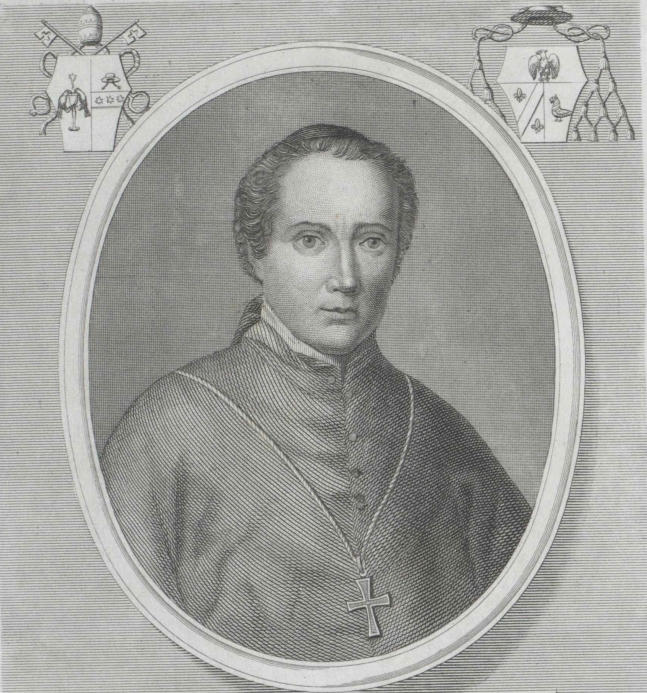
- Church: Roman Catholic Church
- Appointed: 14 April 1852
- Term ended: 12 March 1856
- Predecessor: Antonio Francesco Orioli
- Successor: Niccola Paracciani Clarelli
- Other post: Cardinal-Priest of San Girolamo dei Croati (1836–61)
- Previous posts: Titular Archbishop of Beirut (1833–34); Archbishop of Ferrara (1834–43); Camerlengo of the College of Cardinals (1858–59)

Orders
- Ordination: 26 September 1830 by Giacinto Placido Zurla
- Consecration: 15 September 1833 by Bartolomeo Pacca
- Created cardinal: 1 February 1836 by Pope Gregory XVI
- Rank: Cardinal-Priest

Personal details
- Born: Gabriele della Genga Sermattei; 4 December 1801 Assisi, Papal States
- Baptised: 4 December 1801
- Died: 10 February 1861 (aged 59) Rome, Papal States
- Buried: San Lorenzo in Lucina
- Parents: Filippo della Genga; Marianna Confidati Sermattei

Gabriele della Genga Sermattei (4 December 1801 – 10 February 1861) was a Catholic Cardinal and Camerlengo of the Sacred College of Cardinals.

== Early life and priesthood ==
Sermattei was born on 4 December 1801 in Assisi. He was the son of Count Filippo della Genga and nephew of Annibale della Genga (Pope Leo XII).

He was educated at the Jesuit College, in Orvieto where he received a doctorate in utroque iuris, both civil and canon law. Sermattei was ordained on 26 September 1830 and was appointed domestic prelate to Pope Pius VIII and then Pope Gregory XVI. He was also named Relator of the S. Consulta. Canon of the patriarchal Lateran basilica.

He was elected titular archbishop of Berito in 1833 and was consecrated by Cardinal Bartolomeo Pacca. He was promoted to the archiepiscopal see of Ferrara the following year in 1834.

== Cardinalate ==
Sermattei was elevated to cardinal and appointed cardinal-priest of San Giorlamo degli Schiavoni in 1836.

He participated in the Papal Conclave of 1846 which elected Pope Pius IX and was the head of the group of three cardinals that governed Rome during the pope's absence in Gaeta between 1849 and 1850, known as the Red Triumvirate.

From 1858 to 1859 he held the position of Camerlengo of the Sacred College of Cardinals.

He also held the following titles:

- Prefect of the Sacred Consulta of Bishops and Religious (1852)
- Prefect of the Sacred Consulta of Religious Discipline (1856)
- Secretary of Apostolic Briefs (1860)
- Grand chancellor of the Pontifical Equestrian Orders.

== Death, burial and funeral ==
Sermattei died on 10 February 1861 in Rome. As per tradition, he was exposed and then buried, according to his will, in the church of S. Lorenzo in Lucina. His funeral was attended by Pope Pius IX.

== See also ==
- College of Cardinals

Catholic Church titles
Preceded by Ugo Pietro Spinola	Camerlengo of the Sacred College of Cardinals; 15 March 1858 – 1859	Succeeded by Clarissimo Falconieri Mellini
