= Mattei (surname) =

Mattei is a surname associated with the noble post-ancient Rome Mattei family. Notable people with the surname include:

- Members of the Mattei family of Italian nobility including:
  - Muzio Mattei (died 1596)
    - Ciriaco Mattei (died 1614) (Muzio's nephew)
    - Girolamo Mattei (1547–1603)(Ciriaco's brother and a cardinal)
    - Asdrubale Mattei (died 1638)(Ciriaco's brother)
      - Girolamo Mattei, Duca di Giove (1606–1676)(Asdrubale's son)
      - Luigi Mattei (1609–1665)(Asdrubale's son)
- Bruno Mattei (1931–2007), Italian movie director
- Clara Mattei (born 1988), Italian economist and academic
- Clarence Mattei (1883–1945), American portrait painter
- Davide Mattei (born 2001), know professionally as Thasup, Italian rapper and record producer
- Enrico Mattei (1906-1962), Italian public administrator who created ENI
- Evelyn Matthei (born 1953), Chilean right-wing politician
- Fernando Matthei (1925–2017), Chilean airforce commander and junta member
- Janet Akyüz Mattei (1943–2004), Turkish-American astronomer and former director of the American Association of Variable Star Observers
- Luca Mattei (born 1964), retired Italian football midfielder
- Maurizio Mattei (1942–2021), Italian football referee and refereeing officer
- Olga Elena Mattei (born 1933), Colombian Poet
- Peter Mattei (born 1965), Swedish operatic baritone
- Sara Mattei (born 1995), know professionally as Mara Sattei, Italian singer-songwriter
- Stanislao Mattei (1750–1825), composer and priest
- Ugo Mattei (born 1961), professor at the University of Torino
