= Palazzo Mattei =

Palazzo Mattei di Giove
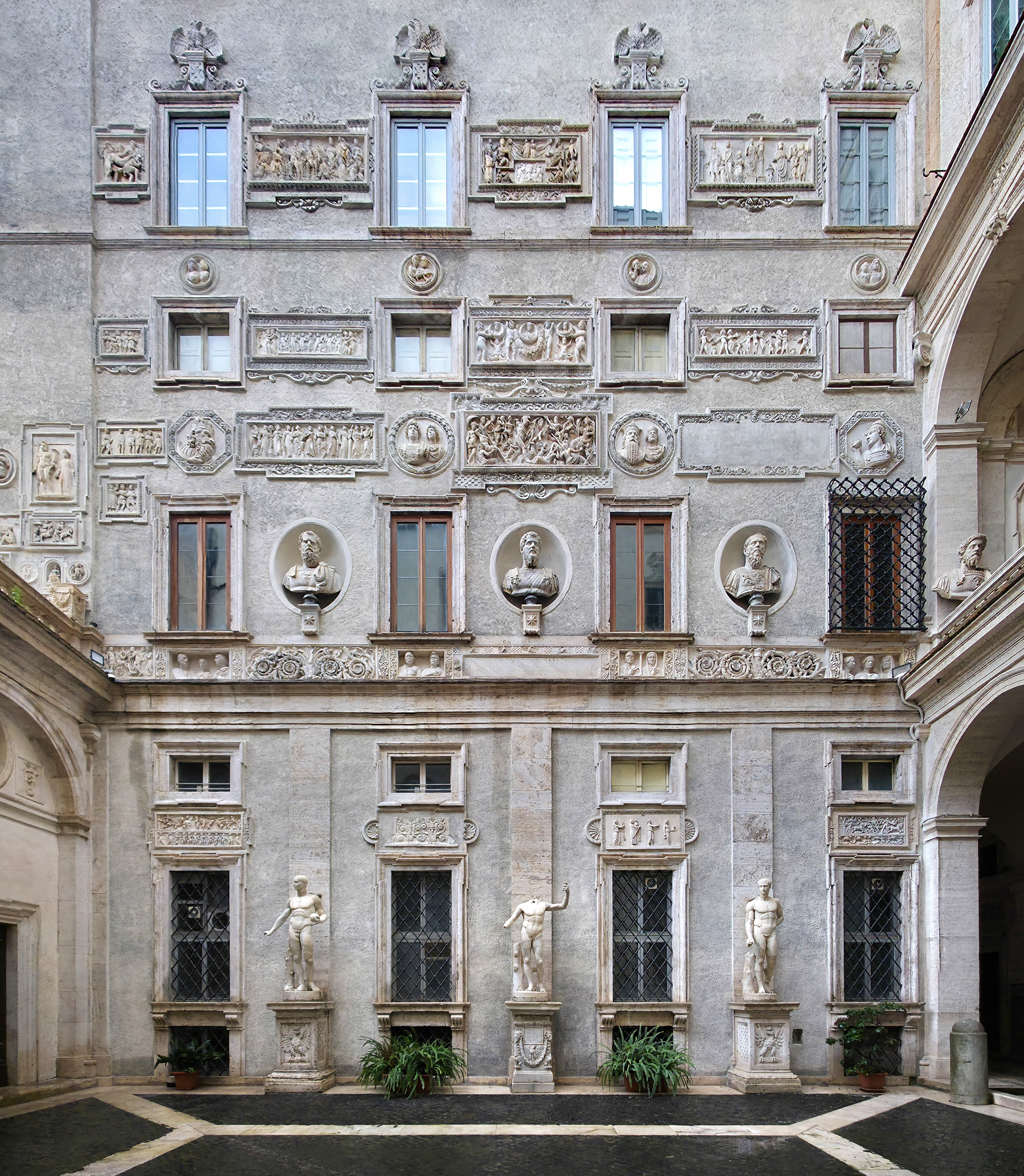
- The courtyard of the Palazzo Mattei di Giove.
- Click on the map for a fullscreen view

General information
- Location: Rome, Italy
- Coordinates: 41°53′39″N 12°28′42″E

The Palazzo Mattei di Giove is the most prominent among a group of Mattei houses that forms the insula Mattei in Rome, Italy, a block of buildings of many epochs.

== Name ==
To distinguish this section from the others it carries the name of a Mattei fief, Giove. The Mattei owned a number of other palazzi that carried the family name including Palazzo Mattei di Trastevere across the Tiber as well as properties in Umbria, the Palazzo Mattei Paganica.

== Description ==
Carlo Maderno designed the palace whose construction started in 1598 and would last until 1618, for Asdrubale Mattei, Marquis di Giove and father of Girolamo Mattei and Luigi Mattei. He was also the brother of Ciriaco Mattei and Cardinal Girolamo Mattei. It was Maderno who was responsible for the extravagantly enriched cornice on the otherwise rather plain stuccoed public façade, the piano nobile loggia in the courtyard and the rooftop loggia or altana.

For the interior of the palazzo, Pietro da Cortona was commissioned to execute the pair of compositions on the ceiling of the gallery, dating before 1626. In the early 19th century, a group of paintings from the collection at the palazzo was purchased by William Hamilton Nisbet and removed to Scotland.

Like others of the Mattei family, Asdrubale Mattei was an enthusiastic patron of the arts. Michelangelo Merisi da Caravaggio (better known simply as Caravaggio) is recorded as living at the palazzo in 1601.

In the 20th century, the facility was converted to a cultural heritage center and hosts a number of organizations such as the Center for American Studies.

Preceded by Palazzo Massimo alle Colonne	Landmarks of Rome; Palazzo Mattei	Succeeded by Quirinal Palace
