= Douglass Ewell Parshall =

20th-century American painter (1899–1990)

- Born: November 19, 1899; New York City, New York, U.S.
- Died: August 29, 1990 (aged 90); Montecito, California, U.S.
- Education: Art Students League of New York, Santa Barbara School of the Arts
- Occupations: Painter, including muralist

Douglas Ewell Parshall (November 19, 1899 – August 29, 1990) was an American painter, including muralist, known for his contributions to the art of the American West and California.

He was an associate academician (ANA) of the National Academy of Design in New York City, and twice recipient of the second Hallgarten Prize: initially in 1924 for his work, The Great Surge, and again in 1927 for The Red Sail. He was considered among the most well-known artists of California during his lifetime.

== Early life and education ==
Parshall first learned to paint around age ten under the tutelage of his father, American painter DeWitt Parshall. He would go on to study at the Art Students League of New York as well as Santa Barbara School of the Arts, following his family's move to Santa Barbara, California, in 1917. While there, he studied under English painter Frank Morley Fletcher and was taught by teacher-painter Frank DuMond, and painter Raymond P. R. Neilson.

== Career ==
Parshall first showed his work at the National Academy of Design at age fifteen and by his early twenties, had achieved reputational and economic success for his paintings, which typically depicted natural landscapes of the American West.

He won his first Hallgarten Prize at age twenty-four and became an associate member of the National Academy of Design at age twenty-seven.

In 1928, his artwork was displayed in the Grand Central Art Galleries and in 1929, he exhibited jointly with his father at the Milch Galleries, both in New York City.

In 1933, he was appointed the Santa Barbara area's local director for the Public Works of Art Project (PWAP), the New Deal precursor program to the Federal Art Project of the Works Progress Administration (WPA). In December 1934, he painted a mural for the Santa Barbara Junior High School library which is still on display today.

In 1936, Parshall was named district supervisor of three counties for the newly created Federal Art Project (FAP), serving under Nelson Partridge Jr. Parshall also provided the painted background for the sea lion exhibit diorama of the Santa Barbara Museum of Natural History.

In 1942, an exhibit of his watercolors was held at the Witte Museum in San Antonio, Texas.

== Personal life ==
Parshall married Barbara Cowles, of Santa Barbara, in 1938.

Parshall's long-time Santa Barbara art studio was located near to peers Raymond Neilson and American portrait painter Clarence Mattei.
