= Supper at Emmaus (Caravaggio, London) =

Painting by Caravaggio

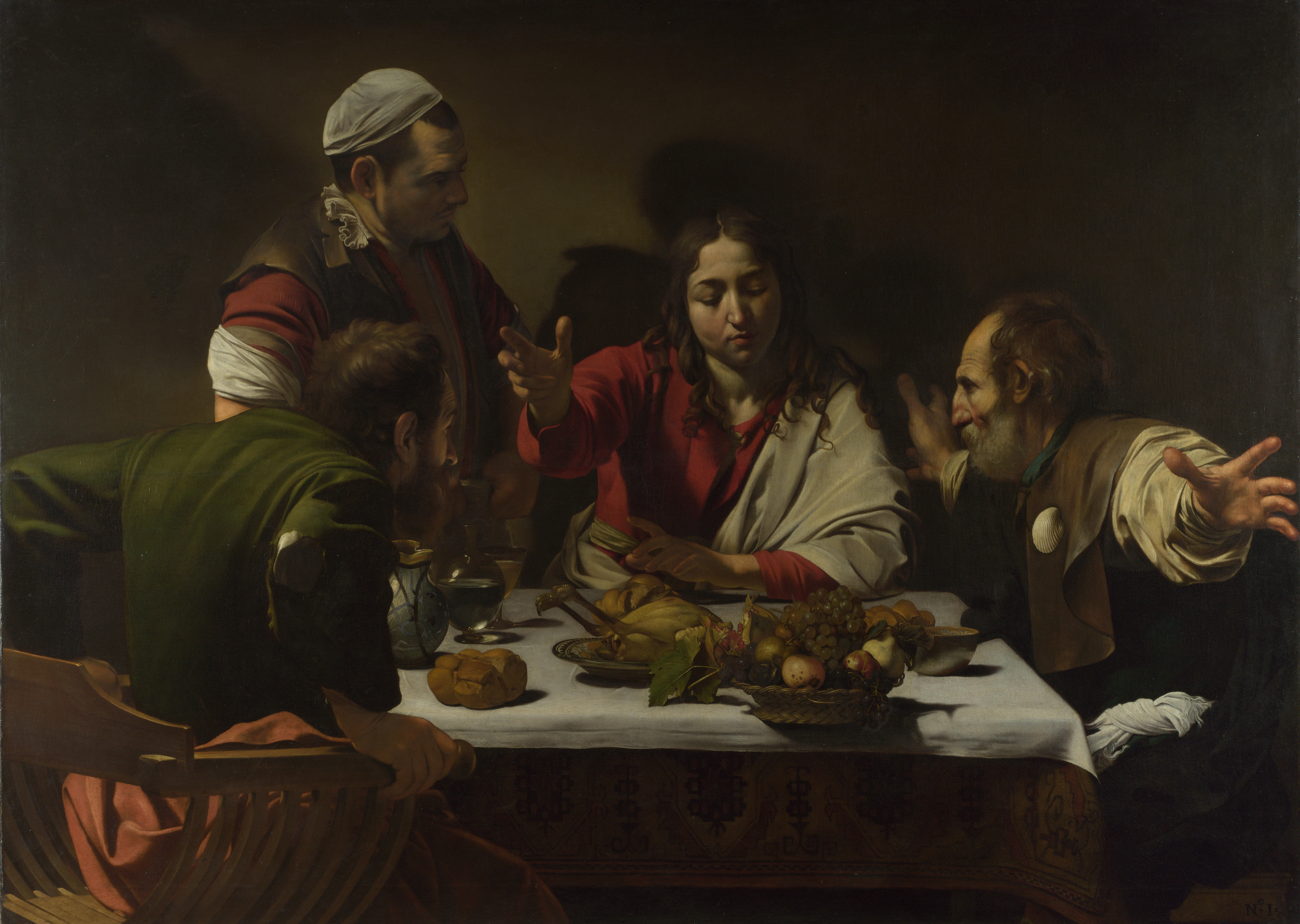
- Artist: Caravaggio
- Year: 1601
- Medium: Oil on canvas
- Dimensions: 141 cm × 196.2 cm (56 in × 77.2 in)
- Location: National Gallery; London

The Supper at Emmaus is a painting by the Italian Baroque master Caravaggio, completed in 1601, and now in London. It depicts the Gospel story of the resurrected Jesus's appearance in Emmaus.

Originally, this painting was commissioned and paid for by Ciriaco Mattei, brother of Cardinal Girolamo Mattei.

== Description ==
The painting depicts the moment when the resurrected but incognito Jesus reveals himself to two of his disciples (presumed to be Luke and Cleopas) in the town of Emmaus, only to soon vanish from their sight (Gospel of Luke 24: 30–31).

In the painting, Cleopas wears the scallop shell of a pilgrim, while the other apostle wears torn clothes. Cleopas gesticulates in a perspectively-challenging extension of arms in and out of the frame of reference. The standing groom, forehead smooth and face in darkness, appears oblivious to the event. The painting is unusual for the life-sized figures, the dark and blank background. The table lays out a still-life meal with the basket of food teetering over the edge.

In the Gospel of Mark (16:12), Jesus is said to have appeared to them "in another form", which may be why he is depicted beardless here, as opposed to the bearded Christ in The Calling of Saint Matthew, where a group of seated money counters is interrupted by the recruiting Christ. It is also a recurring theme in Caravaggio's paintings to find the sublime interrupting the daily routine. The unexalted humanity is apt for this scene, since the human Jesus has made himself unrecognizable to his disciples, and at once confirms and surmounts his humanity. Caravaggio seems to suggest that perhaps a Jesus could enter our daily encounters. The dark background envelops the tableau.

=== Christian symbolism ===
The basket of fruit in the foreground has two stray strands of wicker that form an ichthys, the early Christian fish-symbol for Christ. The shadow of the fruit on the tablecloth forms the body of a fish and fishtail.

== Milan version ==
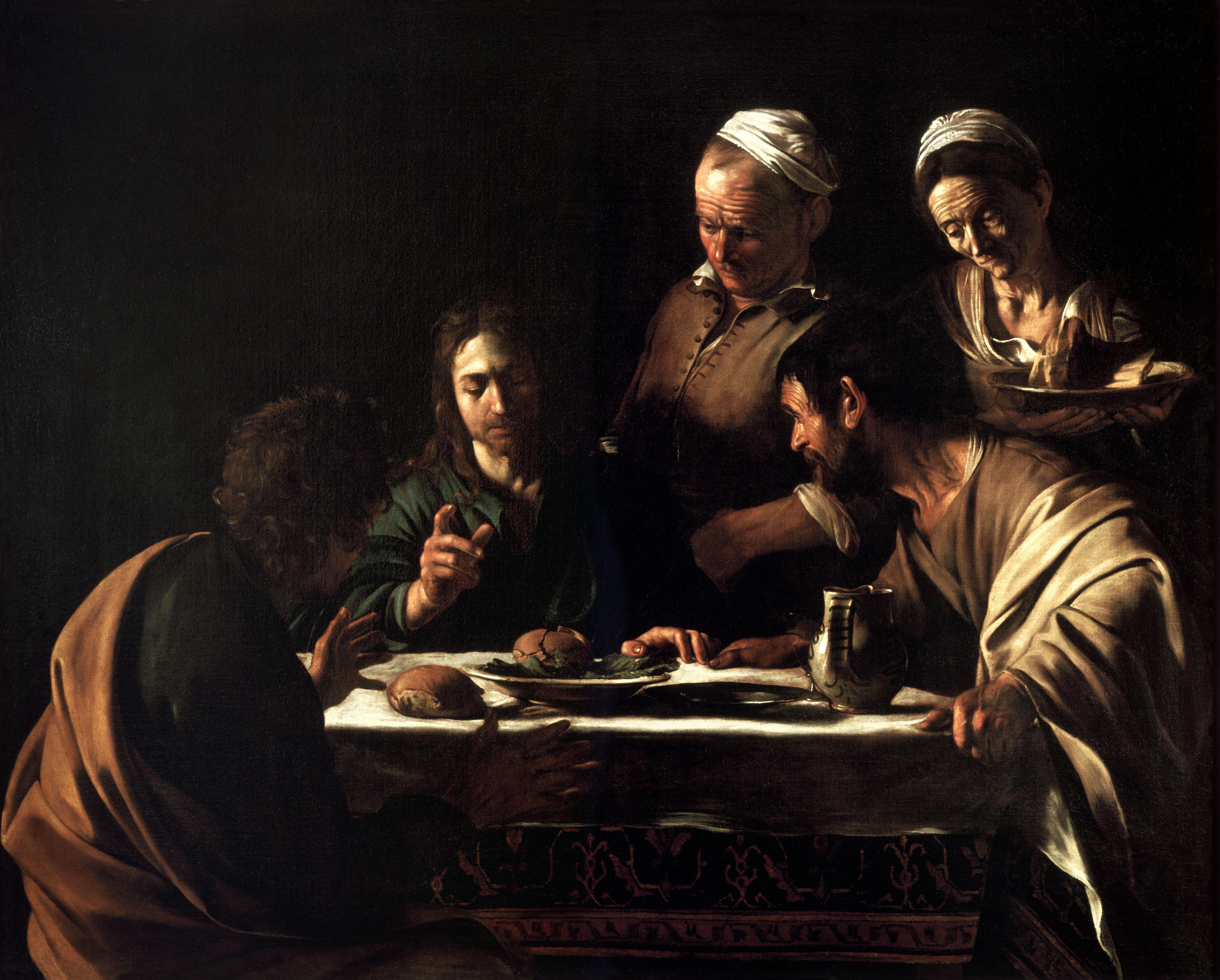
Supper at Emmaus (Milan), 1606. Brera, Milan.

Caravaggio painted another version of the Supper at Emmaus (now in the Pinacoteca di Brera, Milan) in 1606. By comparison, the gestures of figures are far more restrained, making presence more important than performance. The art techniques used in both versions is the trompe-l'œil style which seems to allow characters to move in their gestures, as a means to grab the attention of the observers.

This difference possibly reflects the circumstances of Caravaggio's life at that point (he had fled Rome as an outlaw following the death of Ranuccio Tomassoni), or possibly, recognising the ongoing evolution of his art, in the intervening five years he had come to recognise the value of understatement.

== See also ==
External videos
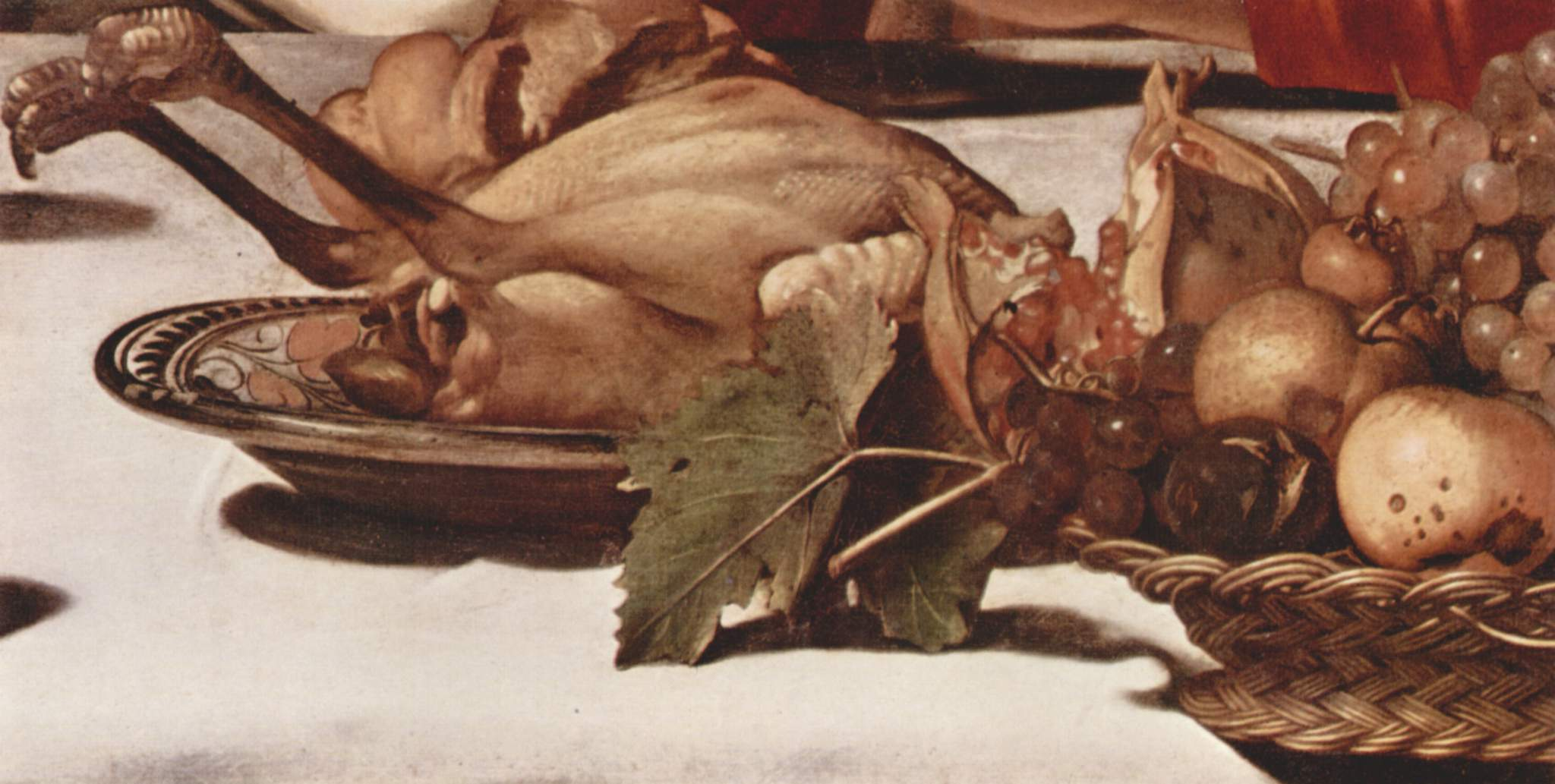
- Caravaggio's Supper at Emmaus, Smarthistory

- List of paintings by Caravaggio
- 100 Great Paintings, 1980 BBC series
