= Center for American Studies =

Center for American Studies may refer to:

- The Center for American Studies, or Centro Studi Americani, in Rome, Italy
- Heidelberg Center for American Studies in Germany
- The Center for American Studies at the Royal Library of Belgium
- Various other institutes described at American studies
