= Robert Cole Caples =

American artist

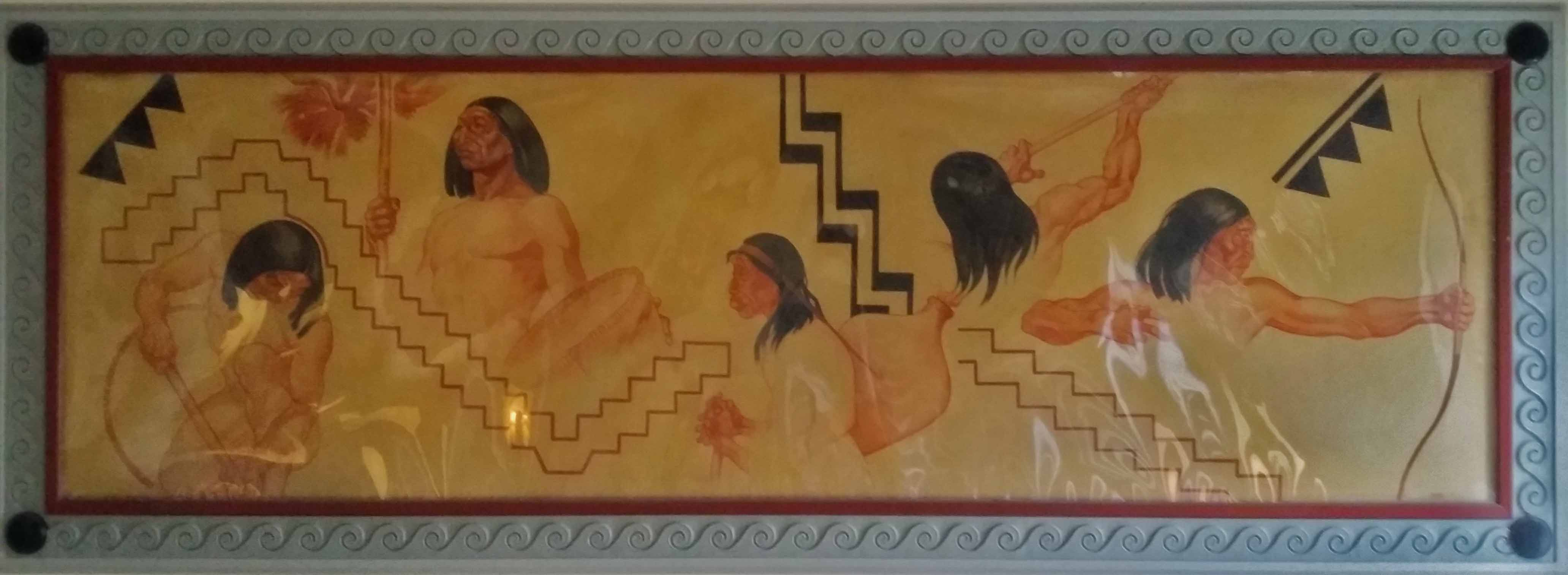
- "Creation," ca. 1935, mural for the Washoe County Courthouse, Reno, Nevada
- Born: 26 November 1908; New York City
- Died: 17 November 1979 (aged 70); Connecticut
- Education: National Academy of Design, Art Students League of New York, Santa Barbara School of the Arts
- Known for: Printmaking, Murals, Paintings
- Spouse: Rosemary Riley [Lake] Caples

Robert Cole Caples (1908–1979) was an American artist known for drawings of American Indians and for painted landscapes of Nevada. He is considered one of the most important modern painters in the history of Nevada.

== Biography ==
Caples was born in New York on 26 November 1908. He grew up in New York City and received early training at the National Academy of Design and at the Art Students League of New York under Frederic Taubes. He would, however, spend 35 years in Nevada: In 1924, at age sixteen, he moved to Reno to live with his father, and shortly thereafter began his studies at the Santa Barbara School of the Arts. Caples established his first studio in 1928 at the Masonic Building in Reno, and then the Clay Peters Building in 1929, at which time he specialized in charcoal portraiture.

By 1932, Caples moved on to specializing in charcoal drawings of American Indians – the work for which he was best known. This period in his work was influenced by his frequent trips to Pyramid Lake and the Paiute Indian population there. One of his American Indian drawings was selected to represent Nevada in the 1939 New York World's Fair. The drawings were later reproduced as portfolios of lithographs published by the University of Nevada Press.

During this period, due to the success of his drawings, he came to be employed by the Federal Arts Project as an artist and later as administrator. He produced several religious paintings while with the project, including Job's Comforters and The Last Supper, both of which were displayed in the University of Nevada library. One of his murals for the Washoe County Courthouse, Creation, is based on a Washoe creation myth showing, as was described in 1936, figures of the "Washoes, Paiutes, Shoshones, and Diggers" through whom the world was populated. His work was interrupted by World War II, while he served in the United States Navy, as well as by illness and additional time in the Art Students League of New York. In September 1942, he joined the Navy and became a Painter 2nd Class Petty Officer.

Following his time with the Farm Security Administration, Caples continued to move to different areas within Nevada. As he began working and living in Virginia City, he came into contact with a broad and diverse range of modernist figures. These included the painters and printmakers Zoray Andrus and Richard Guy Walton, as well as the photographers and historians Lucius Beebe and his partner Charles Clegg. Caples and these artists were part of a thriving artists colony in Virginia City, known as the Comstock Bohemians, who came to the area to escape society. Caples married his wife Rosemary Riley Lake on 17 October 1955.

This period during the 1940s to the 1950s is likewise marked by experimentation with techniques and materials. His style likewise moved not only to include the naturalism and Social Realism of his early career, but also toward stylized landscapes with "haunting" and "atmospheric" effects. Many of these landscapes were completed in the studio he called "Lizard Hall," his final studio in Nevada where he worked from 1956 until 1958. The studio was located behind his home in Dayton and was added to the Nevada State Register of Historic Places in January 2007.

In 1958, he moved to Hartford Connecticut, a move which caused him a great amount of loss and sorrow. In a letter to Norrine Buck, he described how he comforted himself through the depression and disconnect of leaving the state: "I now remember that originally comforted myself by calling (to myself alone) our present address 'dePreston, disConnecticut.'" His feelings for the Nevada landscape were intense and, as he described, imperishable.

During his time in Connecticut, he completed his work on his illustrated children's book The Potter and His Children: A Stone Age Fable, which he had first drafted in the 1930s. While the illustrations in the book received good reviews, most reviewers were critical of the story. He nonetheless continued to promote the book into the last months of his life. He died at his home in Hartford on 17 November 1979.

== Style ==
Caples is best known for his charcoal drawings of American Indians, which is the result of his early experiences in Nevada. His frequent trips to Pyramid Lake brought him in contact with members of the local Paiute Indian population, and influenced his personal philosophy and life's work" These drawings have been described as: "[Portrayals of] distinct individuals performing their everyday tasks—figures that seem to have no awareness of the viewer and exude an innate form of dignity and intelligence." He eventually, however, became less interested in particulars and more interested in the essence of the figure. Thus his drawings of American Indians became less portraiture and more impersonal. As Walter van Tilburg Clark described in 1964: "[The] sketches became less and less portraits. They sought Indian, not single Indians." For similar reasons, his portraiture business came to an end.

Though Caples did receive formal art education, it was no until after his time with the Federal Arts Project that his work became increasingly experimental. during and following his time in Virginia City, as Marcia Cohn Growdon describes, his work began to take on a "pleasing assimilation of some of the major styles evolving among such artists as Edward Hopper, Stuart Davis, or John Marin, and even the regionalists like Thomas Hart Benton or Grant Wood." Growdon continued:

Views of Virginia City in all the subtle greys and roses of worn wood and faded paint show Caples playing with some of the spatial concepts first tested by the cubists, or creating an airless, timeless view of the village reduced to the very geometric essence of structures. [...] In the 1950s and 1960s he created elegant, haunting landscapes that portrayed no place in particular, but were precise distillations of the desert, mountains, and dramatic atmospheric effects experienced in the desert. Space is at once telescoped and expanded infinitely. The substance of the mountains and the volume of air are sucked out in favor of the essence of mountains and glowing atmospheric effects. Later, he painted a series of mixed-media works on board that dealt with the cosmos; they look like images of stars and galaxies seen through a powerful telescope, or like tracks of subatomic particles exploding across the surface of a powerful microscope.

== Body of work ==
=== Exhibitions ===
- Robert Cole Caples: A Retrospective Exhibition, 1927-63, Church Fine Arts Building, University of Nevada, 15 September – 15 October 1964.
- Robert Cole Caples: the artist and the man, Sierra Nevada Museum of Art, 12 December 1981 – 17 January 1982
- Robert Cole Caples: Rooted in Nevada, Nevada Touring Initiative's Traveling Exhibition Program, 2008 – 2009.

=== Published works ===
- Caples, Robert. The Desert People: A Portfolio of Nevada Indians. University of Nevada Press, 1970.
- Caples, Robert.The Potter and His Children: A Stone Age Fable. New York: Carlton Press, 1971.
- Caples, Robert. People of the Silent Land: A Portfolio of Nevada Indians. University of Nevada Press, 1972.

== Bibliography ==
=== References ===
- "Caples' Drawing Given High Rating." Reno Gazette-Journal 60, no. 139 (10 June 1936): 5.
- "Ceremonies Held on Campus to Accept New Offerings." Reno Gazette-Journal 66, no. 45 (22 February 1938): 5.
- Growdon, Marcia Cohn. "Robert Cole Caples (1908-1979)." Nevada Historical Quarterly 33, no. 2 (Summer 1990): 158–161.
- Hughes, Edan. Artists in California, 1786-1940. 3rd ed. 2 vols. Sacramento: Crocker Art Museum, 2002, p. 191.
- Japenga, Ann. "Unexpected Beauty: Robert Cole Caples’ Nevada." California Desert Art, 14 June 2018.
- Lindsay, Russ. Education Guide | Robert Cole Caples: Rooted in Nevada. Reno, NV: Nevada Arts Council, 2008.
- Lindsay, Russ. "Remembering Robert Cole Caples." Nevada Historical Quarterly 50, no. 4 (Winter 2007): 344–348.
- Miller, Geralda. "Forgotten artists: Exhibit reveals work, lifestyle of 'misfit' artists." Reno Gazette-Journal (24 July 2011): 3.
- McKim, William (Mrs.). "Robert Cole Caples Lectures at Meeting." The Nevada State Journal 81, no. 99 (17 March 1951): 5.
- "Recent wedding is announced." Nevada State Journal 85, no. 285 (21 October 1955): 5.
- "Robert Caples to Speak at AAW Meet." Reno Gazette-Journal 74, no. 310 (12 March 1951): 6.
