= Luigi Mattei =

Italian military general

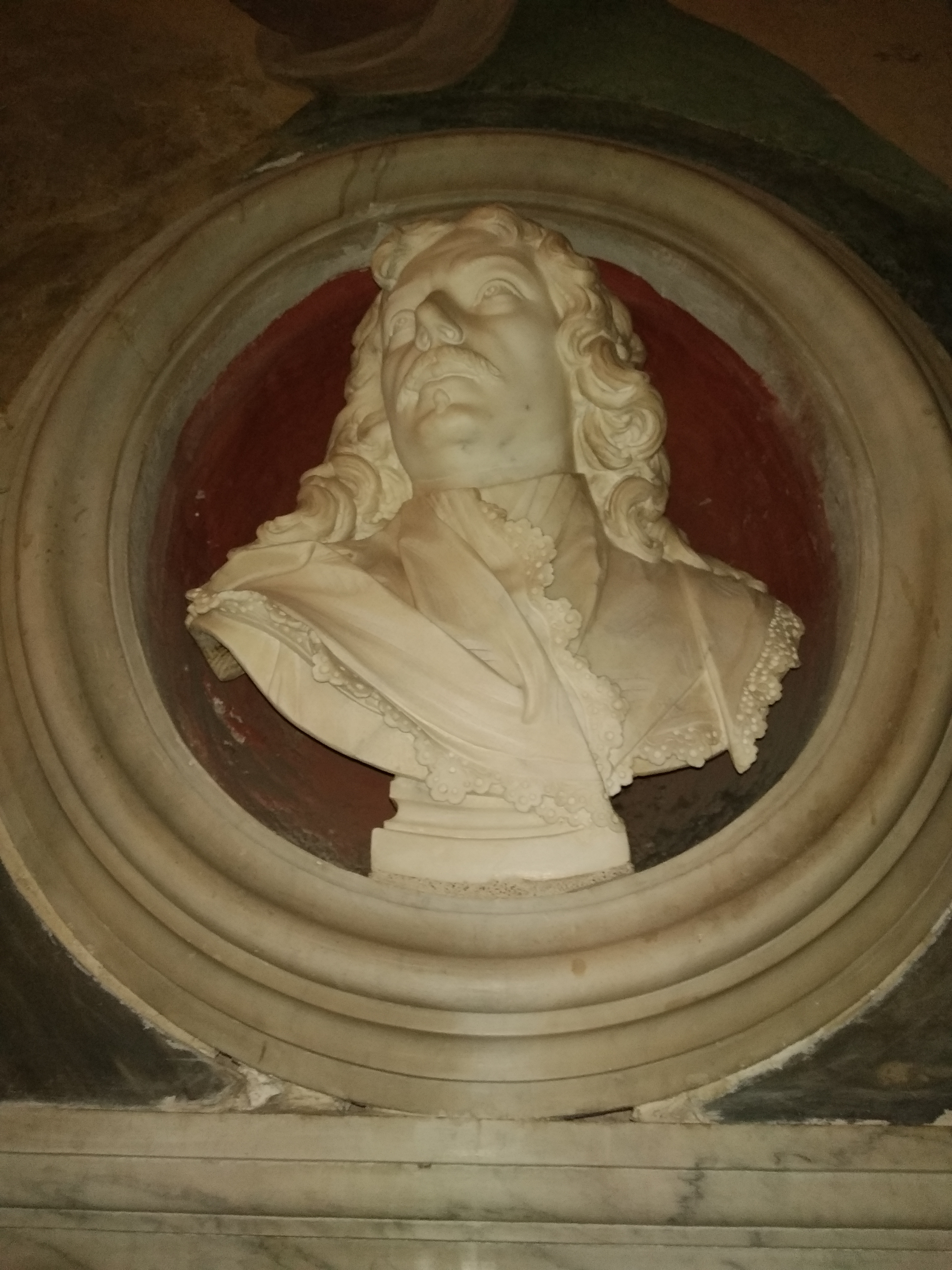
- Luigi Mattei
- Born: November 19, 1609; Rome, Papal States
- Died: 8 June 1665 (aged 55); Rome, Papal States
- Military career
- Allegiance: Holy Roman Empire; Spain; Papal States
- Branch: Imperial Army; Army of Flanders; Papal Army
- Service years: 1627–1665
- Rank: Lieutenant general
- Conflicts: Thirty Years' War; Eighty Years' War; Wars of Castro
- Awards: Knight of the Order of Alcántara

Luigi Mattei, Marquis of Belmonte (19 November 1609 – 8 June 1665) was an Italian general and diplomat. He led papal forces during the Wars of Castro.

== Biography ==
Mattei was the second son of Asdrubale Mattei, Marquis di Giove, of the House of Mattei and his wife Costanza Gonzaga di Novellara of the House of Gonzaga. His older brother, Girolamo Mattei, became Duca di Giove. He was the nephew of Ciriaco Mattei and Cardinal Girolamo Mattei.

He began his military career at an early age. Between 1627 and 1628 he moved to Germany, where he was given command of an infantry company of the Imperial Army.

In the summer of 1630 he fought on the Oder against the Swedish Army led by King Gustavus Adolphus, who had occupied Pomerania. At the beginning of September 1631, he took part in the battle of Breitenfeld, at the head of a regiment of five hundred musketeers. During the fighting he was seriously wounded. Taken prisoner by the enemy troops, he was able to win the esteem of the king of Sweden, who did not oppose the efforts of imperial and papal diplomacy for his release.

Once freed, Mattei returned to active service. He assumed command of an infantry regiment and took part in the defense of Regensburg, attacked by a Swedish Army under the command of Bernard of Saxe-Weimar in the autumn of 1633. In the mid-1630s, he left Germany and entered the staff of Cardinal-Infante Ferdinand of Austria, Governor of the Spanish Netherlands. He took part in several operations against the Dutch and remained in Flanders until 1640.

== Military career ==
During the late 1630s, Pope Urban and his Barberini nephews came into conflict with the Farnese Dukes of Parma sparking the conflict known as the First War of Castro. In 1641, Mattei was appointed Lieutenant General of the papal armies and was accordingly given a monthly salary of 343 scudi. On 12 October he led 12,000 infantry and 3,000 cavalry against the fortified town of Castro which was under the control of the Farnese. Though it is estimated that the Farnese had amassed a similarly sized army, Mattei's forces were met with very little resistance and the town was forced to surrender. Mattei's victory at Castro was immortalised in song by Marco Marazzoli.

Evidence suggests that Mattei commanded his own private standing army (much smaller without additional Papal soldiers) of approximately 4000 troops. After the initial contact with Farnese troops, Mattei's soldiers left the bulk of the papal army and followed him. They were involved in further skirmishes while remaining Papal troops returned to defend Rome. Papal and Barberini forces suffered a number of decisive defeats and Pope Urban was eventually forced to agree to treaty terms with the Farnese to halt the conflict.

When Ranuccio II Farnese refused to pay the debts assigned to him in the treaty that ended the First War of Castro, Pope Innocent X sent a force to again occupy the city. The Duke rode out to challenge the papal forces but was routed by Mattei. Forces loyal to Innocent X razed Castro and it was never rebuilt. Thus ended the Second War of Castro.

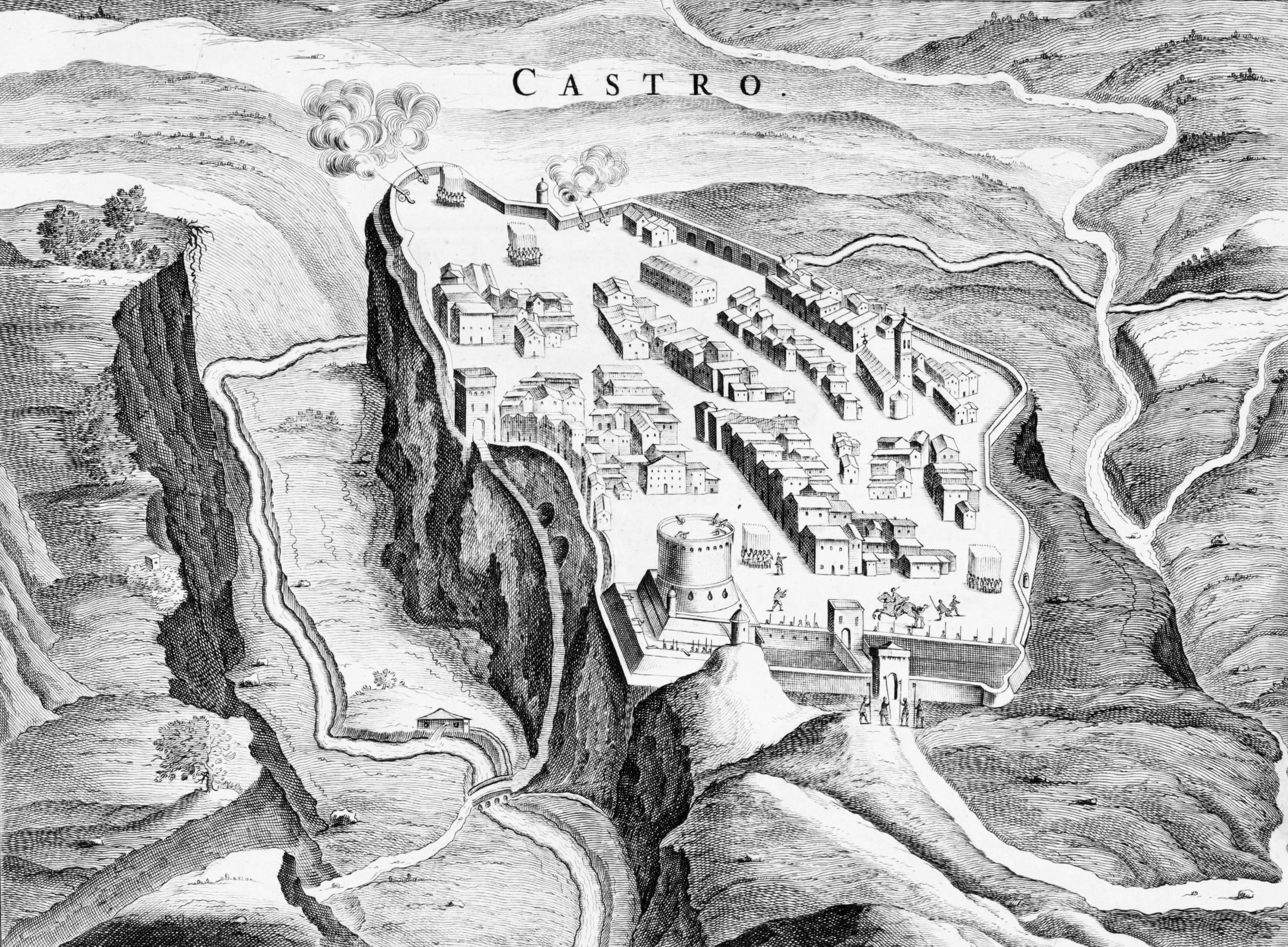
The City of Castro; site of the two wars

After the end of the war, Mattei obtained permission to go to Brussels, where he became member of the staff of the Grand Condé, who had entered the service of Spain after the Fronde. He was charged with recruiting contingents for the final phase of the Franco-Spanish War in Flanders.

== Later life and death ==
In 1656 Mattei moved to Vienna, where he became a member of the Imperial War Council. On behalf of Leopold I, he was entrusted with an embassy to Pope Alexander VII. The purpose of the mission was gaining papal support in view of a new war against the Ottoman Empire. With the help of Cardinal Girolamo Colonna, Mattei attempted to persuade the pope, but the mission was eventually unsuccessful.

In 1663, Mattei went back to Rome. He settled in the family palace on Via dei Funari. Alexander VII appointed him lieutenant general of the Papal Army with a monthly salary of 300 scudi. He died in Rome on 8 June 1665.

== See also ==
- Belmonte Calabro
- Wars of Castro
- Early modern warfare - Europe
- House of Mattei
- Palazzo Mattei
- Barberini
