= DeWitt Parshall =

American painter

- Born: 1864; Buffalo, New York, U.S.
- Died: July 7, 1956 (aged 91–92); Santa Barbara, California, U.S.
- Occupation: Painter

DeWitt Parshall (1864-1956) was an American painter, based in Montecito, California since 1916. One of his paintings is held by the Metropolitan Museum of Art, though not currently on view.

He is the father of American painter and muralist, Douglass Ewell Parshall.
