= Luigi Ciacchi =

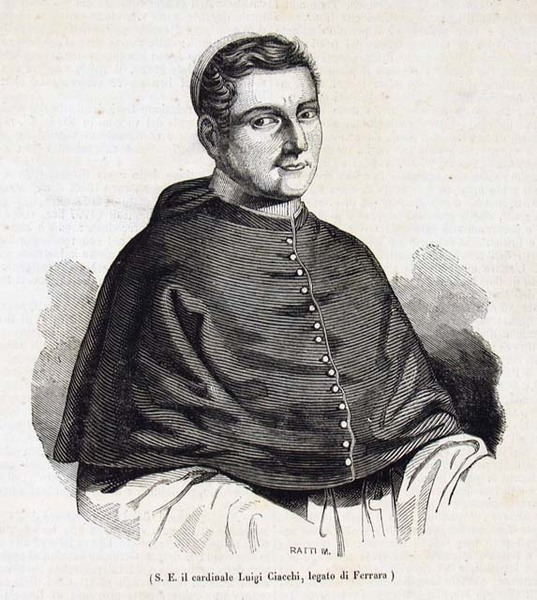

Luigi Ciacchi (August 16, 1788 – December 17, 1865) was an Italian Cardinal and priest of Roman Curia.

Born in Pesaro, Marche, he was made Cardinal by Pope Gregory XVI. He also took part in the conclave that elected Pope Pius IX.

He was 100 years old when died in Rome on 17 December 1865. He was also the oldest member of the College of Cardinals upon his death, he became the oldest member upon the death of Cardinal Mattei on 24 July 1833 he was succeeded by Cardinal Antonio Tosti as oldest living Cardinal.

Records
Preceded by Lorenzo Girolamo Mattei	Oldest living Member of the Sacred College; 24 July 1833 - 17 December 1865	Succeeded by Antonio Tosti
