= Mattei family =

Italian noble family

Coat of arms of the Mattei family

The House of Mattei was one of the most powerful noble families of Rome during the Middle Ages and early modern era, holding high positions in the papal curia and government office. The family amassed significant art collections under art enthusiasts such as Ciriaco Mattei.

The Mattei gave eight Cardinals to the Catholic Church, among them Girolamo Mattei (1586), Gaspare Mattei (1643), Alessandro Mattei (1803), Mario Mattei (1832), Lorenzo Girolamo Mattei (1833) and (as late as 1875) Ruggero Luigi Emidio Antici Mattei. The founder of one powerful branch of the Mattei was Giovanni Giacomo Mattei.

== History ==
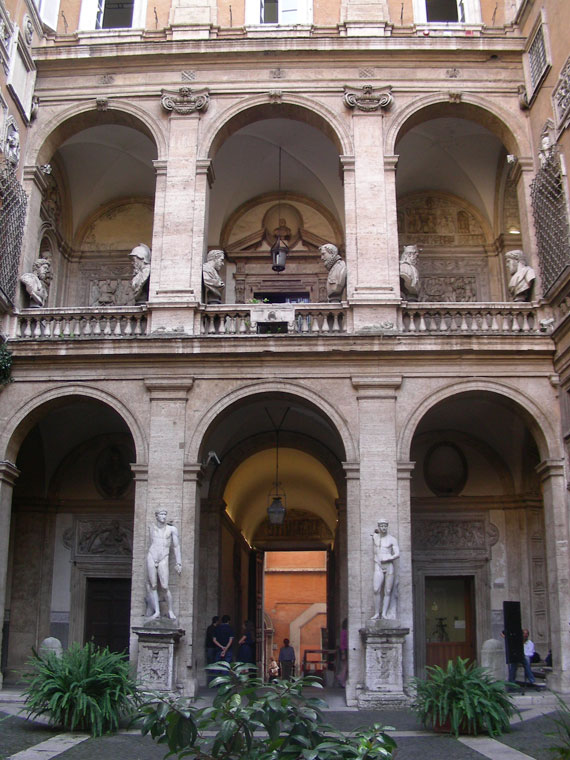
Cortile Mattei di Giove

Mattei family lines reportedly went back to an early Roman family, the Papareschi, and their ancestors included Pope Innocent II (1130–1143). In the 1350s the family moved to the Rione Sant Angelo, and they eventually built six residences in the block called the Isola Mattei. The Mattei established themselves in politics and banking and were closely connected to the politics of the Church; later to its military conquests.

Though they lived in the Roman Ghetto, the historic Jewish quarter, they were Roman Catholic. When Pope Paul IV decided to build a wall around the Ghetto in 1555, at the invitation of the Roman Jews who wished to be isolated on the Sabbath, the Mattei were given a key to the gate by the Jews.

== Property ==
In Rome, the Mattei owned five palazzi in the rione, or quarter, of Sant'Angelo (together they formed the so-called "isola dei Mattei": see Palazzo Mattei), and one in Trastevere. Moreover, they owned Villa Celimontana in the rione Celio. The family assumed control over the bridges closest to their ancestral palace during the papal interregnum, levying charges on various types of traffic, including the Jews who lived in the nearby ghetto when burying their dead outside the city.

The purchase of the territory of Giove in 1597 entitled the Mattei to the title Marquis di Giove (raised in 1643 to a dukedom), in addition to their older title of Nobile Romano. Other Mattei titles included Duke of Paganica and Marquis di Belmonte.

In 1580–1585, Muzio Mattei commissioned one of the most famous fountains in Rome, the Fontana delle Tartarughe (Turtle Fountain) in front of his residence.

== Family tree ==
House of Mattei family tree during the 16th and 17th centuries:

Alessandro Mattei	Emilia Mazzatosta	Muzio Mattei
Ciriaco Mattei	Giulia Matuzzi	Cardinal Girolamo Mattei	Asdrubale Mattei; Marquis di Giove	Costanza Gonzaga
Giovanni Batista Mattei	Alessandro Mattei	Girolamo Mattei; Duke of Giove	Luigi Mattei; Marquis di Belmonte	Paolo Mattei

== Differentiation ==
Like many noble Italian families of the period, sons were often named in honour of their predecessors. It the case of the Mattei, the same christian names are given many times over. The Alessandro Mattei listed in the final branch of the family tree above, though sources suggests he undertook an ecclesiastic career, is not Alessandro Mattei (1744–1820). Ironically though, the latter Alessandro was also nephew to a Luigi Mattei; born in 1702 who later became a cardinal (not the military Luigi Mattei listed above).

Though direct relations are not clear, biographies of contemporaries Alessandro Mattei (1744–1820), Lorenzo Girolamo Mattei (1748–1833), Mario Mattei (1792–1870) and Ruggero Luigi Emidio Antici Mattei (1811–1883) suggest they were all related.

== See also ==
- Palazzo Mattei
