= Lorenzo Girolamo Mattei =

Italian cardinal (1748–1833)

His Eminence Lorenzo Girolamo Mattei
- Latin Patriarch of Antioch
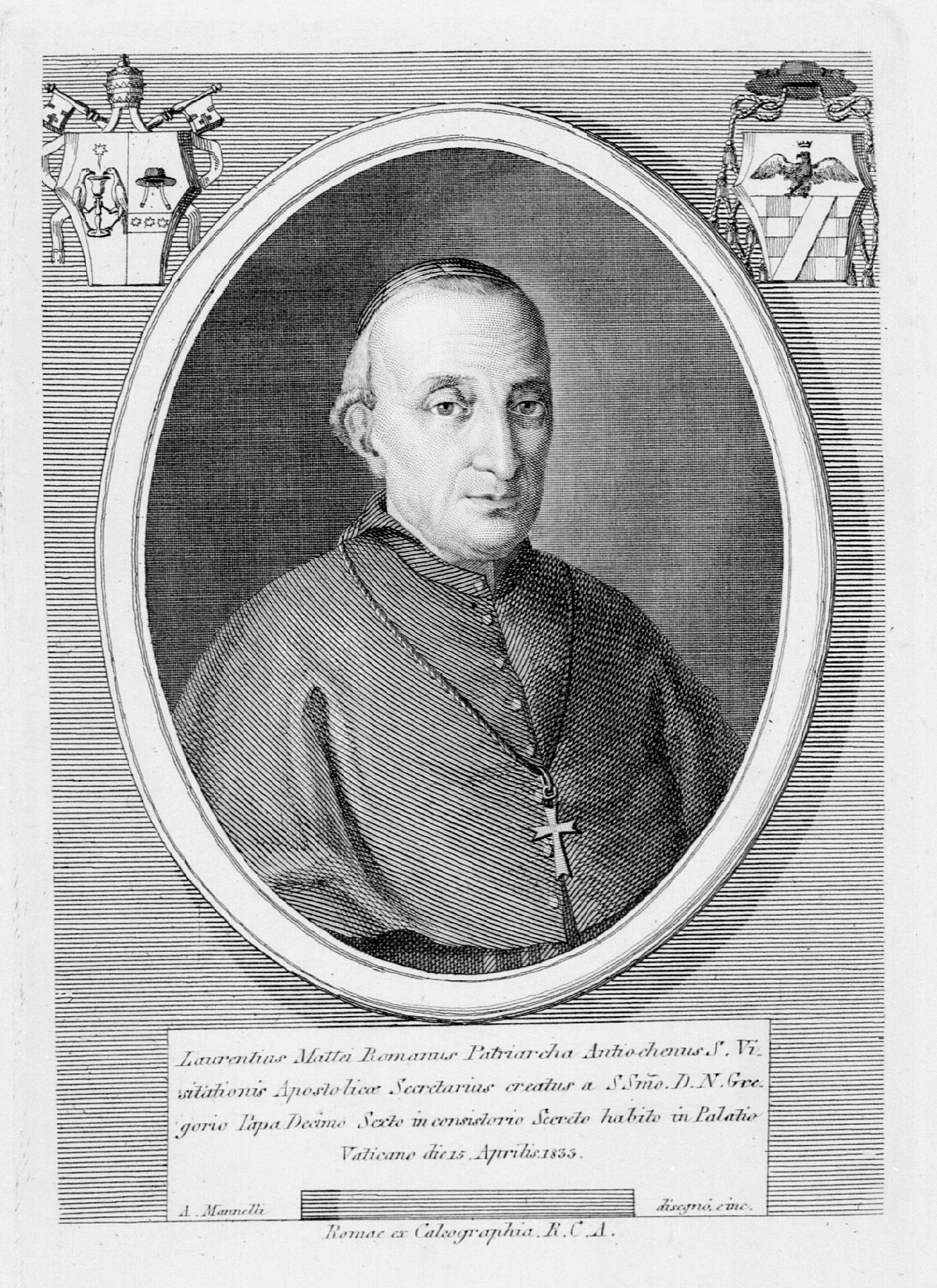
- Church: Roman Catholic Church
- See: Jerusalem
- Appointed: 27 September 1822
- Term ended: 24 July 1833
- Predecessor: Antonio Despuig y Dameto
- Successor: Antonio Piatti

Orders
- Ordination: 13 June 1772
- Consecration: 29 September 1822 by Giulio Maria della Somaglia
- Created cardinal: 15 April 1833 by Pope Gregory XVI
- Rank: Cardinal-Priest

Personal details
- Born: Lorenzo Girolamo Mattei; 29 May 1748 Rome, Papal States
- Died: 24 July 1833 (aged 85) Rome, Papal States
- Buried: Santa Maria in Ara Coeli
- Parents: Girolamo Mattei; Maria Caterina Altieri

Lorenzo Girolamo Mattei (29 May 1748, Rome - 24 July 1833) was an Italian cardinal from the house of Mattei. He was promoted to cardinal by pope Gregory XVI in the consistory of 15 April 1833. He was also nominal Latin Patriarch of Antioch.

Records
Preceded by Benedetto Naro	Oldest living Member of the Sacred College; 6 October 1832 - 24 July 1833	Succeeded by Luigi Ciacchi
