= Asdrubale Mattei =

Italian nobleman (died 1638)

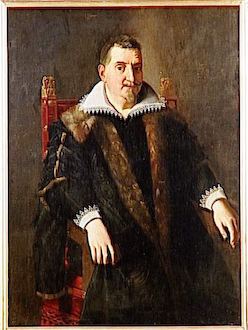
Portrait of Asdrubale Mattei di Giove by students of Caravaggio (c. 1615).

Asdrubale Mattei (died 1638), Duca di Giove, was an Italian nobleman of the House of Mattei, an avid art collector and a patron of Caravaggio.

== Family ==
Mattei was the third of three sons of Alessandro Mattei and Emilia Mazzatosta and the younger brother of Ciriaco Mattei and Cardinal Girolamo Mattei. He married Costanza Gonzaga (of the House of Gonzaga) and they had three sons:

- Girolamo Mattei, future Duca di Giove
- Luigi Mattei, future Marquis di Belmonte
- Paolo Mattei

== Patron of the arts and architecture ==
In 1597, Mattei and his brother Ciriaco paid 65,000 scudi for the fortified comune of Giove which allowed Mattei to be appointed Duca di Giove (Duke of Giove). Mattei passed the title and property to his son, Girolamo. Between 1598 and 1618, Mattei commissioned architect Carlo Maderno to build the Palazzo Mattei.

Mattei was a strong supporter of baroque artist Caravaggio. The artist lived at Mattei residences, the Palazzo Mattei and latter the Villa Mattei and Mattei (and his brother Ciriaco) commissioned a large number of works from the painter. The works included The Taking of Christ (for which Mattei and his brother paid a paltry 125 scudi).

It was reported that Mattei began a tradition which later took hold among Italian noblemen and carried on through the 17th century. Upon meeting his social "superior", Cardinal Alessandro Farnese (both were in carriages) in a public street, Mattei ordered his carriage stopped as a mark of respect. The cardinal then ordered his carriage to come alongside Mattei's so that the two could converse. The practice became a standard part of interactions between the various sub-classes of Italian nobility.
