= Antonio Tosti =

His Eminence Antonio Tosti
- Archivist of the Vatican Secret Archives; Librarian of the Vatican Apostolic Library
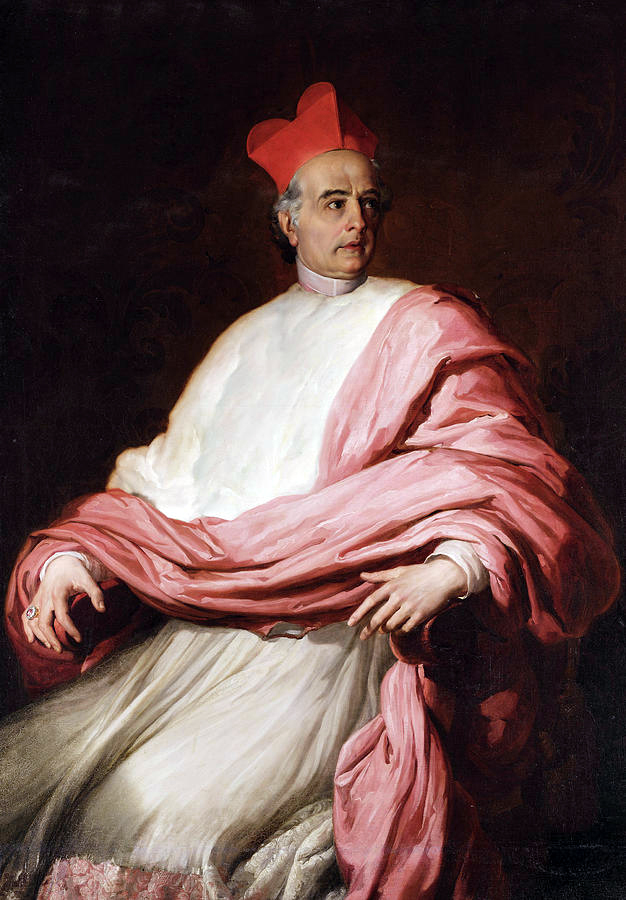
- Portrait - Francesco Coghetti.
- Church: Roman Catholic Church
- Appointed: 13 January 1860
- Term ended: 20 March 1866
- Predecessor: Angelo Mai
- Successor: Jean-Baptiste-François Pitra
- Other posts: Cardinal-Priest of San Pietro in Montorio (1839–66); Protopriest (1863–66)
- Previous post: Camerlengo of the College of Cardinals (1859–60)

Orders
- Created cardinal: 12 February 1838 (in pectore); 18 February 1839 (revealed) by Pope Gregory XVI
- Rank: Cardinal-Priest

Personal details
- Born: Antonio Tosti; 4 October 1776 Rome, Papal States
- Died: 20 March 1866 (aged 89) Rome, Papal States
- Buried: San Michele a Ripa
- Parents: Tommaso Tosti; Agnese Massaroti
- Education: Collegio Romano

Antonio Tosti (4 October 1776 – 20 March 1866) was Catholic Cardinal-Priest of San Pietro in Montorio in Rome and later Camerlengo of the Sacred College of Cardinals and Librarian of the Vatican Library.

== Personal life ==
Tosti was born on 4 October 1776 in Rome, where he died on 20 March 1866.

== Cardinal-Priest ==
Little else is known of Tosti's personal life and few official records exist prior to his elevation to Cardinal (in pectore) and appointment as Cardinal-Priest of San Pietro in Montorio on 18 February 1839 where he served until his death.

== Official Vatican roles ==
In 1859 Tosti was appointed Camerlengo of the Sacred College of Cardinals (not to be confused with the role of Camerlengo of the Holy Roman Church).

Tosti resigned from this post in 1860 upon appointment as the Librarian of the Vatican Library, a title he held until his death in 1866.

== See also ==
- Catholic Church
- College of Cardinals
- Vatican

Catholic Church titles
Preceded by Clarissimo Falconieri Mellini	Camerlengo of the Sacred College of Cardinals; 1859–1860	Succeeded by Gaspare Bernardo Pianetti
Preceded by Angelo Mai (–1854)	Librarian of the Vatican Library; 1860–1866	Succeeded by (1869–) Jean-Baptiste-François Pitra
Records
Preceded by Luigi Ciacchi	Oldest living Member of the Sacred College; 17 December 1865 – 20 March 1866	Succeeded by René-François Régnier
