= Penna in Teverina =

- Comune
- Comune di Penna in Teverina
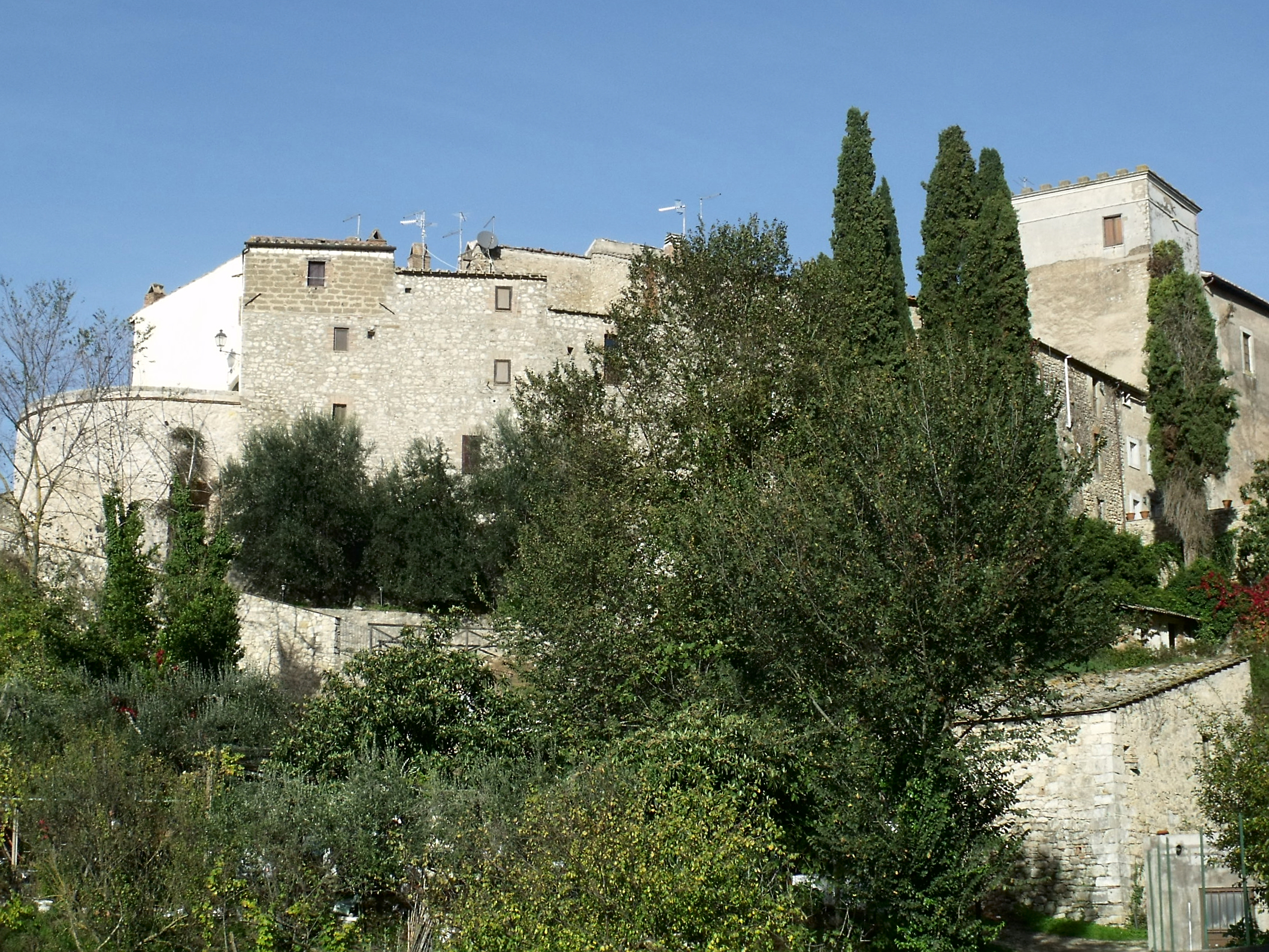
- View of Penna in Teverina

- Coat of arms

- Location within Italy Location within Umbria
- Coordinates: 42.492411°N 12.355458°E
- Country: Italy
- Region: Umbria
- Province: Terni (TR)

Government
  - Mayor: Cesare Valeriani

Area
  - Total: 10.0 km^{2} (3.9 sq mi)
- Elevation: 302 m (991 ft)

Population (1 January 2025)
  - Total: 1,022
  - Density: 102/km^{2} (265/sq mi)
- Demonym: Pennesi
- Time zone: UTC+1 (CET)
  - Summer (DST): UTC+2 (CEST)
- Postal code: 05028
- Dialing code: 0744
- Patron saint: St. Valentine
- Saint day: February 14
- Website: Official website

Penna in Teverina is a comune (municipality) in the Province of Terni in the Italian region Umbria, located about 70 km south of Perugia and about 25 km southwest of Terni.

== History ==
Between the 14th and 16th centuries Penna experienced repeated military incursions. In 1354 the troops of Fra Moriale entered the town and carried out looting, followed in 1360 by the Company of the Hat after their campaign in Giove. In 1378 Breton mercenaries connected to the counts of Baschi attacked the settlement.

During the 15th century Niccolò Fortebraccio also took control of the area. Pope Nicholas V responded by requesting the intervention of Francesco Sforza, who eventually restored papal authority after armed conflict.

Control of the castle shifted several times. It belonged to the Orsini family, was later placed under Amelia in 1437, then linked to Perugia, and from 1479 came directly under the Church. Around the mid-15th century Count Everso II degli Anguillara briefly removed it from Papal control.

In 1528 Fabrizio Maramaldo, allied with the Landsknecht, passed through the territory and plundered the town. The Orsini again held Penna in the early 16th century, maintaining possession until the period of the French Revolution.

In 1816 the town was designated a baronial locality within the Delegation of Spoleto. The territorial adjustments of 1817 and 1827 placed it under the authority of the governor of Amelia, while later reforms in 1833 and 1858 recognized it as a comune associated within the Delegation of Spoleto. According to the 1861 census, Penna in Teverina had a resident population of 704 inhabitants.

== Geography ==
Penna in Teverina is located in southern Umbria. The town stands on a hill not far from the left bank of the Tiber River. It lies southwest of Amelia, northwest of Orte, and about 35 kilometres (22 mi) from Terni.

== Economy ==
In the 19th century the surrounding land was described as fertile, producing cereals and supporting extensive vineyards and olive groves, which formed the basis of the local rural economy.

== Religion and culture ==
=== Santa Maria della Neve ===
The Church of Santa Maria della Neve has early medieval origins, when it was a small rural parish around which the first inhabited nucleus developed before later fortification. The building is documented at least from 1476 and was enlarged and extensively renovated during the 16th and 17th centuries, with further works recorded in 1639.

The church has a simple classical façade and a single-nave interior articulated by blind arcades and terminating in a semicircular apse. The apse basin is decorated with a 17th-century painting depicting the Madonna of the Snow and Saint Valentine. Other artworks include a canvas of the Virgin preserved behind a wooden protective panel on one of the side altars. The structure retains the simple and linear forms established in the 17th century, including a gabled roof surmounted by a small bell tower.

Saint Valentine is the patron saint of Penna in Teverina, and his feast is celebrated on 5 and 6 August.

=== Secular buildings ===
The Fonte Orsina, a substantial travertine fountain dating to the Middle Ages, remains one of the town’s notable historic structures.
