= Edward Borein =

American etcher and painter

- Born: October 21, 1873; San Leandro, California, U.S.
- Died: May 19, 1945 (aged 71); Santa Barbara, California, U.S.
- Other name: John Edward Borein
- Occupations: Etcher, painter, illustrator, educator
- Known for: American Frontier art
- Spouse: Lucile Maxwell

John Edward Borein (1873–1945) was an American etcher, painter and illustrator from California. He extensively travelled the western United States working as a cowboy before transitioning to become a full-time professional artist. He spend his early artistic career working in studios between Oakland, California and New York, New York. Later in his career, Borein resided in Santa Barbara California where he worked for over 20 years. His artwork depicted Spanish Colonial California, the American Frontier, and Mexico.

== Early life (1873–1904) ==
John Edward Borein was born on October 21, 1873, in San Leandro, California. His maternal grandfather was "one of the most famous horsemen in Alta California". Borein's father was a sheriff's deputy in Alameda County and he was later elected Alameda County Recorder. Borein took to art at an early age and he quickly became fascinated with the American Frontier. He rejected more traditional careers including law enforcement, and after a brief flirtation as a saddler's apprentice, at the age of 17 he found work as a cowboy in 1893. At his mother's insistence, Borein returned home after a year doing ranch work and spent a month at the San Francisco Art Association Art School, after which he promptly resumed ranching. He worked on the land for two decades. Borein worked in 1894 as a vaquero on the Jesus Maria Rancho (later known as Vandenberg Space Force Base). Borein honed his love of the American Frontier and art having spent time working on different western ranches from Canada to Mexico and Guatemala. It was in 1896 when Borein was encouraged to send a few of his drawing into The Land of Sunshine, a magazine published by Charles Lummis. A short while later, Borein received a check in the mail, and several of his drawing were published in August edition of The Land of Sunshine. Borein worked on the ranches during the day, sketching when he could, and further practicing his art in the evening. However, despite finding some success publishing his early work, he continued to resist settling down and focused on his true love, working as a cowboy. In 1903, toward the end of his cowboy days, Borein found himself working on the 500,000 acre Hacienda Babicora in the employ of Mrs. Phoebe Hearst, mother of publisher William Randolph Hearst.

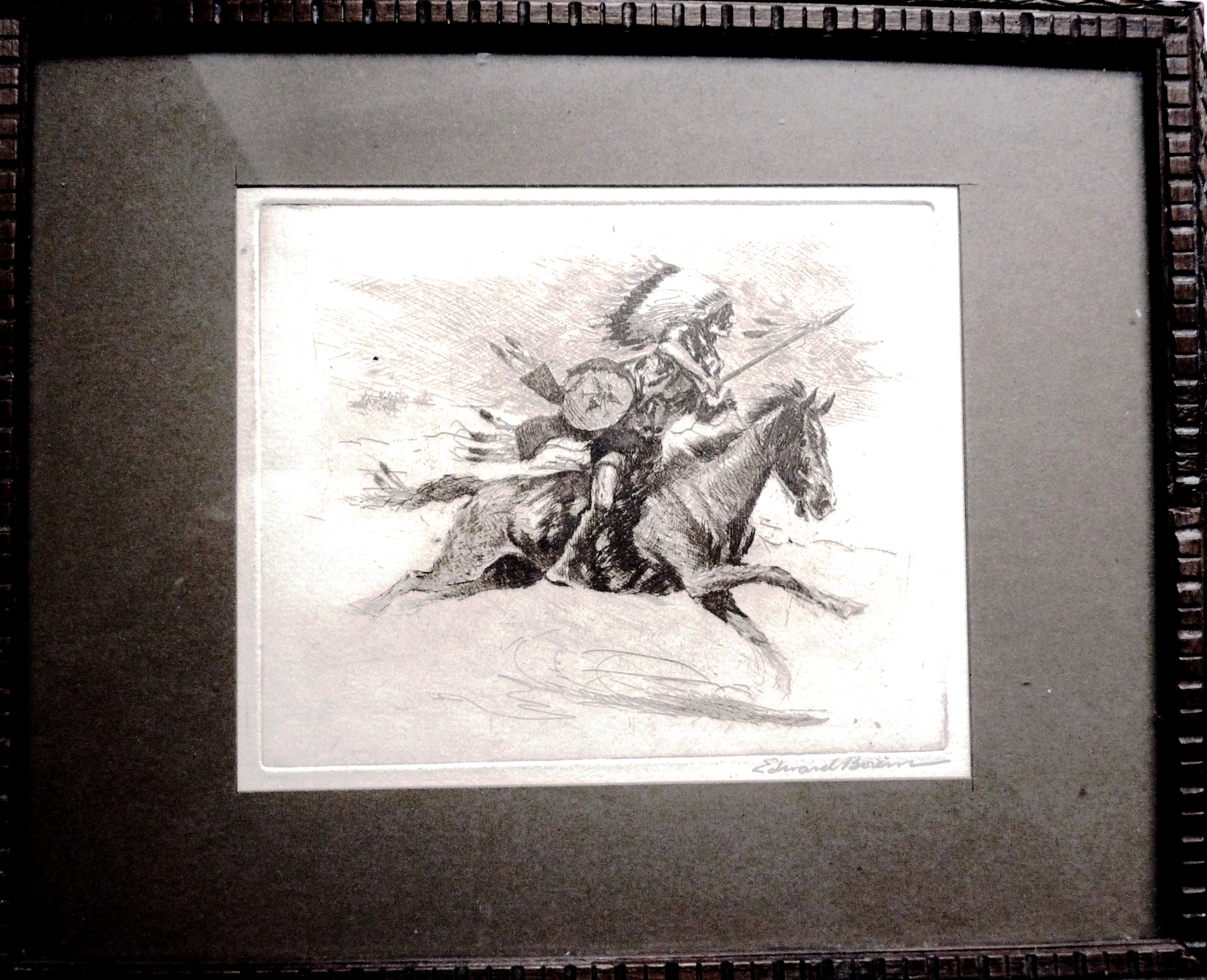
Charging Hawk by Borein, 1920.

== Early art career (1904–1921) ==
1904 was a watershed year for Borein. Whether it was the rigors of ranching wearing down the then 31 Borein, or the call of his art that continued to mature with each sketch, drawing and painting, he chose in 1904 to partially depart the range and open a studio in Oakland, California., It was during this early career period that Borein began to split, albeit unevenly, his time between New York City and Oakland. For example, In December 1907, Borein moved east and opened a studio in New York City where he enjoyed his first public exhibition in 1908. During Borein's time in New York City, he became associated with contemporaries such as Leo Carrillo, Will Rogers, Buffalo Bill Cody, and Teddy Roosevelt. Borein did his arguably most famous commissions in September 1912, creating works associated with the Calgary Stampede. Borein also became friends with Charles Marion Russell, an American Frontier painter from Montana, and further cultivated his deep friendship with Will Rogers. According to The Los Angeles Times, "The three formed a triumvirate who depicted with picture and legend the West before the days of the fences."He also studied art in New York City and in Paris. He was primarily trained as an illustrator.

== Santa Barbara years (1921–1945) ==
"I believe only an accurate history of the west, nothing else, but that. If anything isn't authentic or just right, I won't put it in any of my work.”-Edward Borein

In his later years, as Borein's career continued to evolve, becoming recognized as a skilled etcher and painter. He opened a studio in El Paseo, Santa Barbara, California, in 1921. It quickly became a popular meeting place for local artists. He also taught etching at the Santa Barbara School of the Arts. His works of art were nostalgic artistic representations of the Western lifestyle. He depicted scenes of Spanish Colonial California, including Spanish missions. Another theme included the American Frontier, especially Native Americans and cowboys. His work was part of the painting event in the art competition at the 1932 Summer Olympics.

== Personal life, death and legacy ==
Borein married Lucile Maxwell in 1921. They resided in Santa Barbara, California. The Boreins built their first home on the Santa Barbara Mesa and named it La Barranca, where it featured ocean views and was a popular meeting place for show business people, artists, writers and politicians. The Boreins later resided in Montecito, California.

Borein help organize the first Old Spanish Days Fiesta in 1924 and drove a pack of mules in the first Old Spanish Days parade.

Borein died of a heart attack on May 19, 1945, in Santa Barbara, at age 72.

Some of his paintings and etchings are displayed in the Santa Barbara Historical Museum's Edward Borein Gallery. In 1971, he was inducted into the Hall of Great Westerners of the National Cowboy & Western Heritage Museum.
