= Attigliano =

- Comune
- Comune di Attigliano
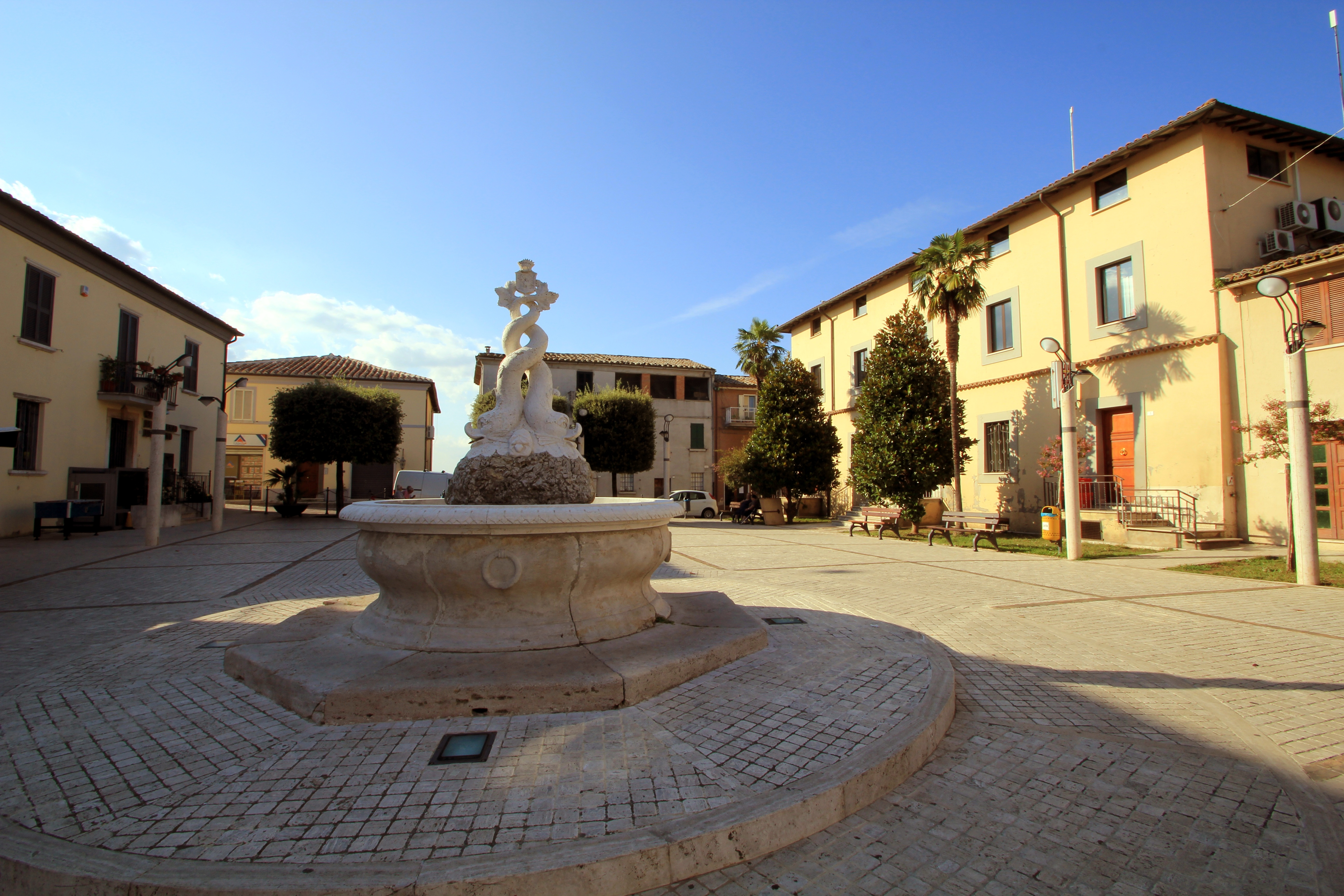
- View of Attigliano

- Location of Attigliano in Italy Attigliano (Umbria)
- Coordinates: 42.514919°N 12.289395°E
- Country: Italy
- Region: Umbria
- Province: Terni (TR)

Government
  - Mayor: Daniele Nicchi

Area
  - Total: 10.4 km^{2} (4.0 sq mi)
- Elevation: 95 m (312 ft)

Population (1 January 2025)
  - Total: 1,946
  - Density: 187/km^{2} (485/sq mi)
- Demonym: Attiglianesi
- Time zone: UTC+1 (CET)
  - Summer (DST): UTC+2 (CEST)
- Postal code: 05012
- Dialing code: 0744
- Patron saint: St. Lawrence Martyr
- Saint day: 10 August
- Website: Official website

Attigliano is a comune (municipality) in the Province of Terni in the Italian region Umbria.

Attigliano is located about 70 km south of Perugia and about 30 km west of Terni. It has the lowest elevation of any municipality located in Umbria.

== Etymology ==
According to local tradition, the name Attigliano derives from the presence of numerous linden trees in the area, from the Latin ad tiliam.

== History ==
Attigliano originated as a commune between the 11th and 12th centuries. The castle of Attigliano is first documented in 1130, when it was under the lordship of Bonconte of Alviano. During the 12th and 13th centuries it came under the control of several noble families, including the Borghese and the Orsini, though it was predominantly associated with the Alviano (or Liviani) family of Todi. In the 13th century the Alviano consolidated their power, becoming lords of Attigliano. During the period of Alviano's dominion, the community possessed its own statutes.

In 1527 Attigliano was devastated by a force of approximately 4,000 men led by the bandit Fabrizio Maramaldo, operating alongside the Landsknechts during the conflicts that affected central Italy in the early 16th century. In 1531 the territory passed by dowry to the Monaldeschi della Cervara family.

In 1654 the territory was acquired by Olimpia Pamphili. Over the course of the 17th century, the castles of the region, including Attigliano, came under the direct authority of the Papal Government.

In 1701, Attigliano was a feudal domain of the Prince Pamphilj, a status which it is recorded as retaining in 1803 under the Prince Doria Pamphilj. By 22 November 1816, ownership is recorded under Duke Don Giulio Lante.

Between 1809 and 1814, during the Napoleonic era, Attigliano formed part of the Department of Trasimeno in the District of Todi. Following the Restoration in 1816, it was designated a baronial place within the Delegation of Spoleto. From 1817 to 1827 it functioned as an appodiato of Giove under the governor of Amelia.

In 1859 Attigliano had 457 inhabitants, of whom 386 lived within the village and 71 in the surrounding countryside. The former feudal estate was owned by Prince Borghese, who is described as the wealthiest landowner in the territory.

== Geography ==
Attigliano is a small town situated near the left bank of the Tiber. lies in a valley with a broad outlook toward the north. The nearest woodland is called La Bandita.

Attigliano is about 15 kilometres (9.3 mi) from Amelia and is served by the Florence–Rome railway, via the Attigliano–Bomarzo railway station. Parts of the settlement are enclosed by medieval walls.

Attigliano borders the following municipalities: Amelia, Bassano in Teverina, Bomarzo, Giove, Graffignano, Lugnano in Teverina.

== Religion and culture ==
The principal religious festival was celebrated on 10 August in honor of Saint Lawrence. The Sisters of Charity were also present in Attigliano in the 19th century.

=== San Lorenzo ===
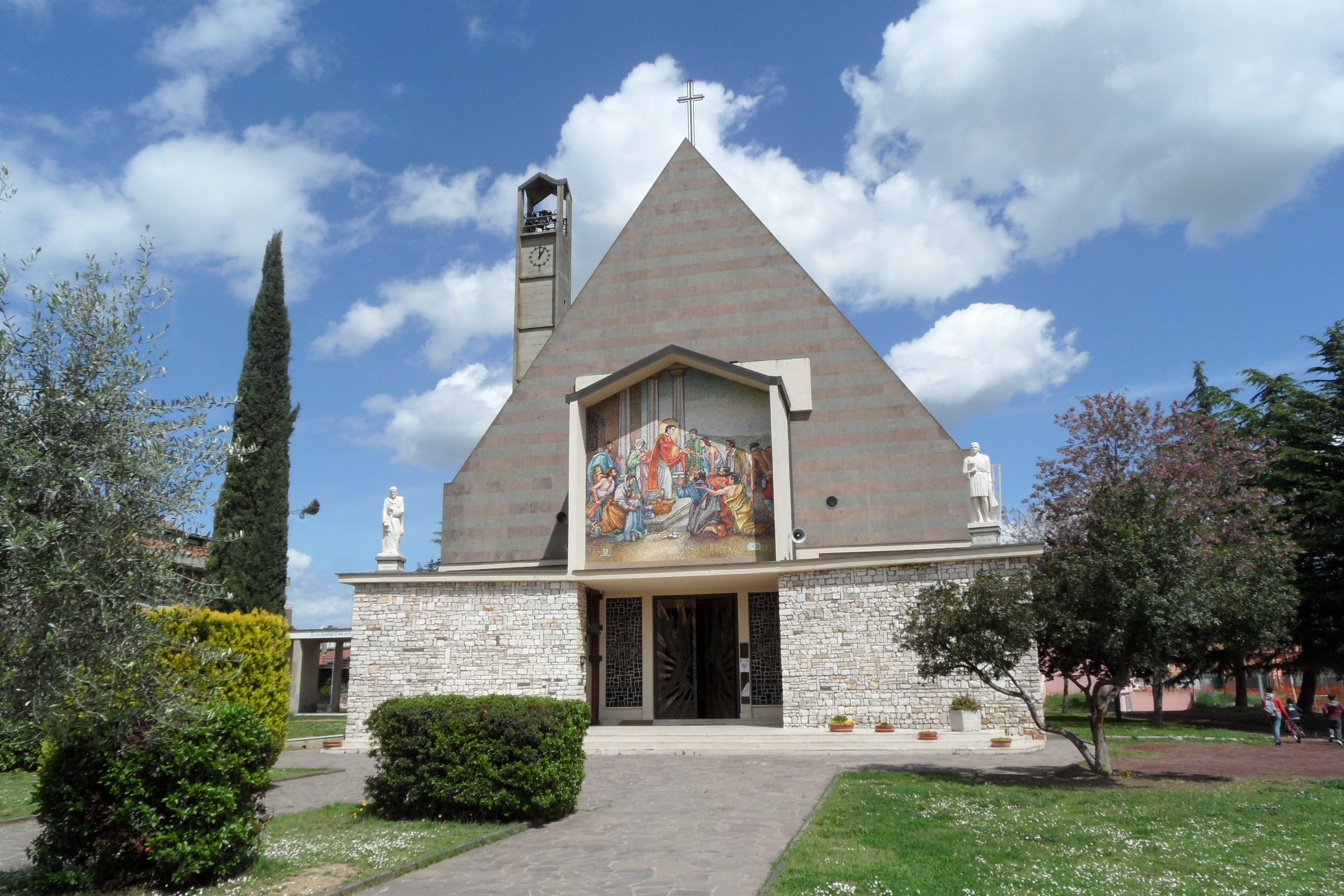
Church of San Lorenzo

The current church of San Lorenzo, built in 1983, is a modern structure characterized by large multicoloured glass windows. The façade features a large mosaic depicting Saint Lawrence distributing the wealth of the Church to the poor. Inside are a Via Crucis designed by the painter Sassu and two Carrara marble statues, representing Christ carrying the Cross and the Madonna of the Eucharist.

The earlier parish church, also dedicated to San Lorenzo, stood within the castle. It contained an organ and housed a panel painting attributed, according to 19th-century sources, either to Giotto or to Pietro Perugino.

=== Secular buildings ===
The castle of Attigliano retains portions of its medieval fortifications, including stretches of walls, six towers, and a 15th-century entrance portal that has been restored. Originally it was surrounded by a moat and accessible by a drawbridge.

In the main square of the historic center stands the Fontana dei Delfini e dei Tritoni, built in 1885. It served both as an ornamental feature and as a source of public water supply, fed by two public springs.
