= Center for American Studies (Rome) =

Nonprofit

The Center for American Studies
- Abbreviation: CSA
- Formation: 1934
- Type: Nonprofit organization
- Purpose: Promotion of US culture and transatlantic dialogue in Italy
- Location: Rome, Italy
- Region served: Italy
- Official language: Italian, English
- Formerly called: Italian Center for American Studies

The Center for American Studies (in Italian: "Centro Studi Americani") is a cultural, nonprofit and independent institution based in Rome, Italy.

The center promotes American culture and transatlantic dialogue through initiatives and projects between United States, Europe and Italy. The center is designed as a structured collaboration with universities, associations and foundations in the field of international relations.

Aside from its collection of books and historical documents, and working closely with the Embassy of the United States in Italy, the Center organizes conferences, seminars and classes, edits publications and, since 2016, awards the annual prize PAIR (Prize for American-Italian Relations). The current President is Gianni De Gennaro.

== History ==
In 1918, the Italian-American Union was founded, establishing its venue at Palazzo Salviati in Rome. The same year, thanks to Nelson Gay, Thomas Nelson Page, the American Ambassador to Italy at the time, and Robert Perkins, American Red Cross Commissioner in Italy, the Library for American Studies was born.

In 1920, while the Library was opening its doors to Italian readers with an endowment of 10,000 volumes, the Italian-American Association's inauguration ceremony took place at Palazzo Salviati.

Between 1934 and 1935, with the aim of fostering bilateral relations, the Italian Center for American Studies was founded in Turin. A year later, the center, which meanwhile had moved to Rome, was declared a Moral Entity under the control of the Italian Ministry of Foreign Affairs. Same year in October, on the occasion of both Columbus Day and the first Americanists Conference in Rome, the Italian Center for American Studies inaugurated its activities at the new headquarters granted by the Italian State: the main floor of Palazzo Mattei.

In 1963, at the proposal of the Italian Ministry of Education, the legal personality of the center was recognized by Presidential Decree. The Center took its current name through the 2005 Statute.

In 2021, the center launched the “Discovering America” training course in History, Institutions, Literature and International Relations for high schoolers from Rome and its administrative Region (Lazio) and, in 2022, the first American Culture Festival.

== Activities ==
Recent activities, between 2019 and 2022, have been articulated along the following thematic areas:

- GeoPol Bridge: International Relations and Geopolitics, in collaboration with Aspen Institute and European Council on Foreign Relations and with con the contribution of the Italian Ministry of Foreign Affairs and International Cooperation
- Cultural Bridge: American Literature, History and Art, inaugurating the American Culture Festival first edition in 2022.
- Cybersecurity and Innovation Bridge: new technologies, from Artificial Intelligence to 5G.
- Green Bridge: Sustainable Development and Environment, from international cooperation and climatic migrations to communication.

The center also launched the “Discovering America” training course in History and Institutions, Literature and International Relations for high schoolers from Rome and Lazio administrative Region.

== Library ==
The Catalog counts more than 50 thousand volumes ranging from the 5th Century to today, first colonial writings about Northern America included. The Archive, which preserves more than 190 historical documents about the foundation of the Italian-American Association and the center, was recognised in 1999 by the Italian Ministry of Cultural Heritage as of historical-national interest.
