= Santa Barbara School of the Arts =

Defunct college of art in California, USA

Coordinates: 34.4232°N 119.6990°W

Santa Barbara School of the Arts was a college of art founded in Santa Barbara, California, by artist Fernand Lungren (1857–1932) in 1920. Faculty members included Edward Borein, who taught etching, and John Marshall Gamble (1863 – 1957), who also served as President of the School Board. Several of the school's pupils would later become well-known, including Douglass Ewell Parshall. The school closed in 1933.
