= Villa Celimontana =

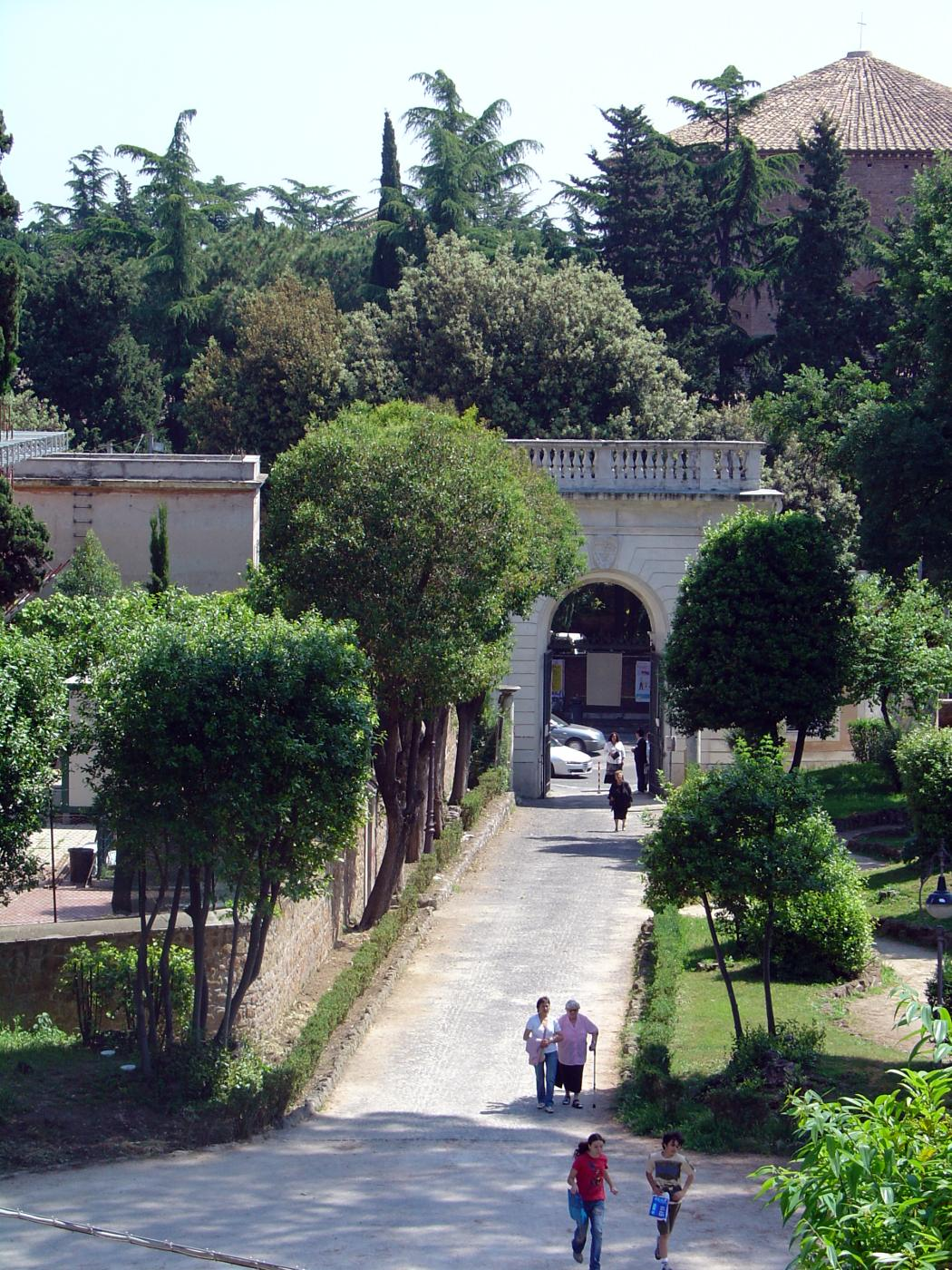
- Entrance, photographed from inside the park
- Click on the map for a fullscreen view

General information
- Location: Rome
- Coordinates: 41°53′3″N 12°29′40″E

The Villa Celimontana (previously known as Villa Mattei) is a villa on the Caelian Hill in Rome, best known for its gardens. Its grounds cover most of the valley between the Aventine Hill and the Caelian.

== Location ==
The Villa Celimontana is situated on the summit of the Caelian Hill in the south-east of Rome in the Rione Celio. The principal entrance is near the Piazza della Navicella, beside the Basilica Santa Maria in Domnica. A secondary entrance is situated on the Clivo di Scauro near the Basilica Santi Giovanni e Paolo. The park is a continuation of the Baths of Caracalla.

== Site ==
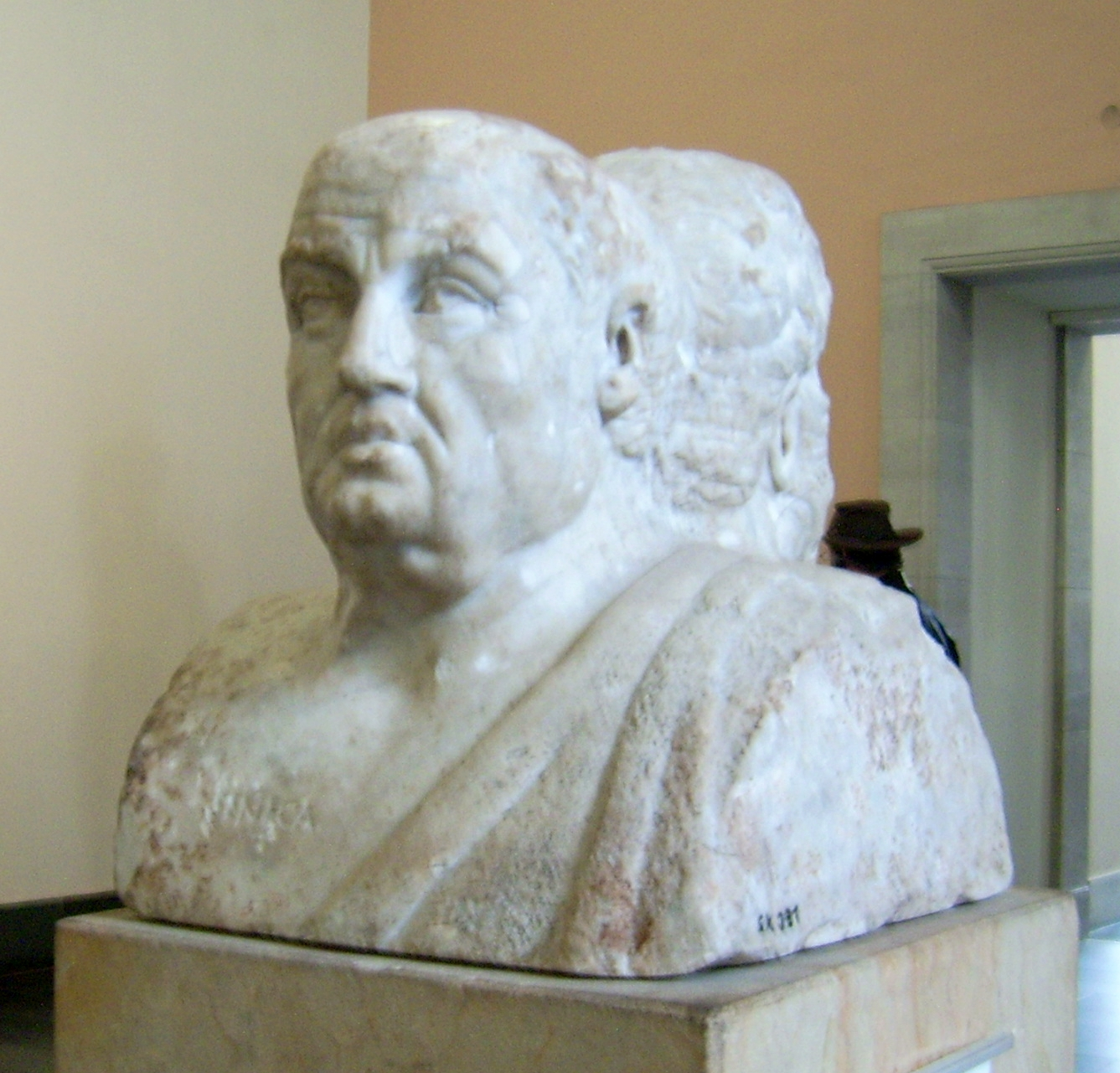
The Herm of Socrates and Seneca, found in the Villa's grounds (Pergamonmuseum)

Tradition holds that Numa Pompilius met the nymph Egeria on the site, and within the grounds of the present villa, to the left of the present entrance from piazza della Navicella, was the base of the 5th cohort of the Vigiles – these Trajanic-era remains were excavated in 1820, 1931 and 1958. In the mid-16th century the site of the grounds was occupied by a vineyard belonging to the Paluzzelli family, near Santa Maria in Domnica. That family ordered excavations there which found the coloured marbles (probably from a temple) which were re-used in Sangallo's Sala Regia at the Vatican.

== Villa ==
In 1553 the vineyard was acquired for 1000 gold scudi by Giacomo Mattei (who also built the 15th-century building in piazza Mattei), but it was Ciriaco Mattei who transformed it into a villa in 1580, instructing the architect Giacomo Del Duca (a student of Michelangelo) to build the villa and the first garden scheme. The original villa has been much adapted, but was probably a single-floor structure with a portico along its facade, topped by a Doric frieze and balustrade which still survive. It now has a quadrangular plan with two low wings and a piazza on an artificial platform supported by large ancient walls (largely Flavian and still visible from the south side).

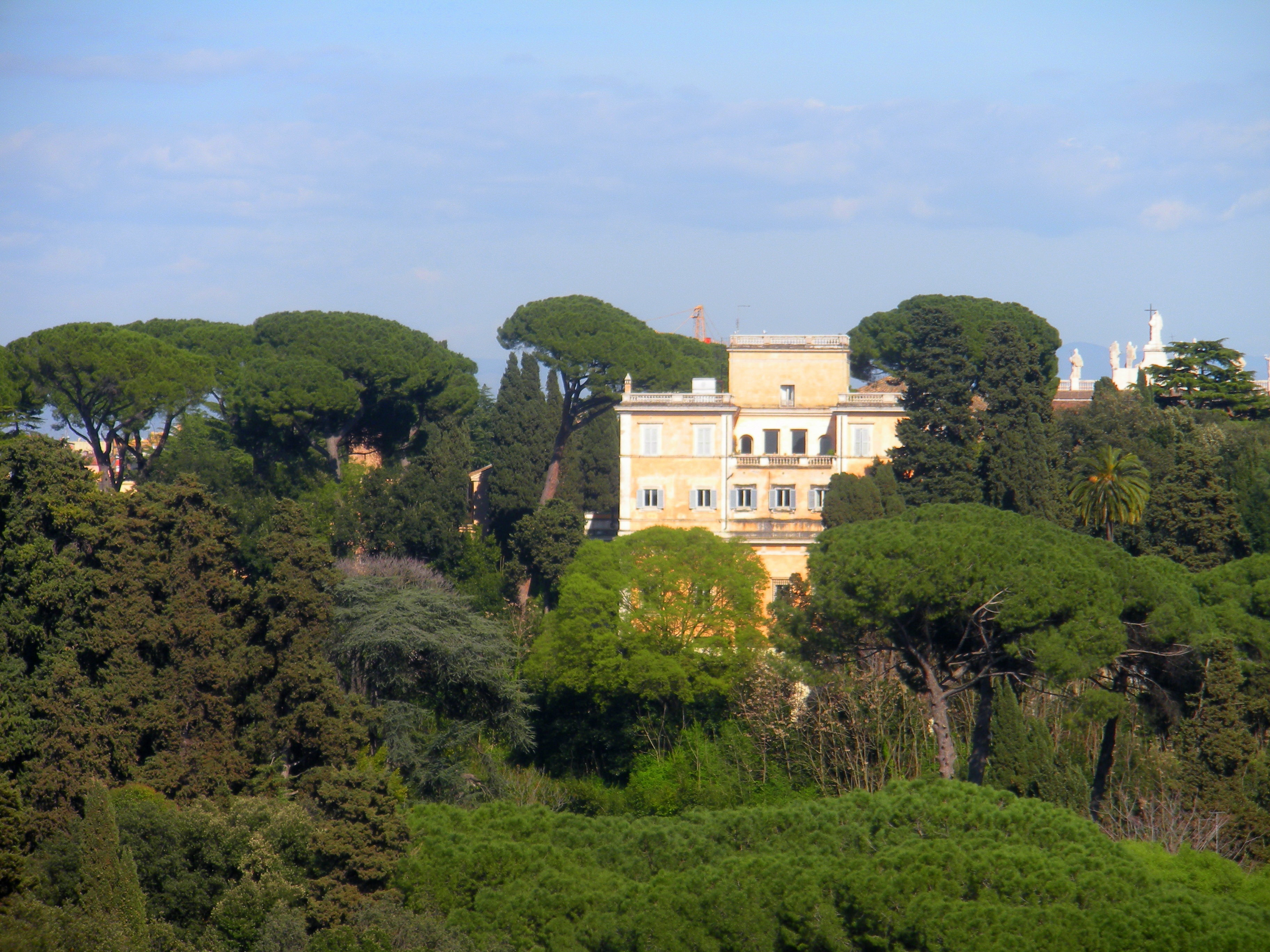
Villa Celimontana from the south

The Mattei collections began to be gutted in 1770 with the sale of 10 statues to the Vatican (including the Amazon, Pudicitia, and seated Trajan, all now at the Louvre) and in 1802 with the head of Augustus (still in the Vatican). The villa, however, remained in the Mattei family until sold by them in 1802. The villa then changed hands rapidly – in 1813 it was acquired by prince Manuel de Godoy, prince of La Paz and minister of Charles IV of Spain. The villa was then taken over by Princess Marianne of the Netherlands (daughter of William I of the Netherlands), then by Frederica (princess of Prussia and of Bauffremont) in 1857, and finally by the Bavarian baron Richard Hoffman in 1869. In the First World War the Italian State confiscated the villa as the property of an enemy national, and in 1923 the most important sculptures in the gardens were moved to the Museo Nazionale Romano. In 1926 the villa was given to the Società Geografica Italiana.

== Gardens ==
View of the gardens of the Villa Mattei, print by Jean-Claude Richard from a painting by Hubert Robert, 1761

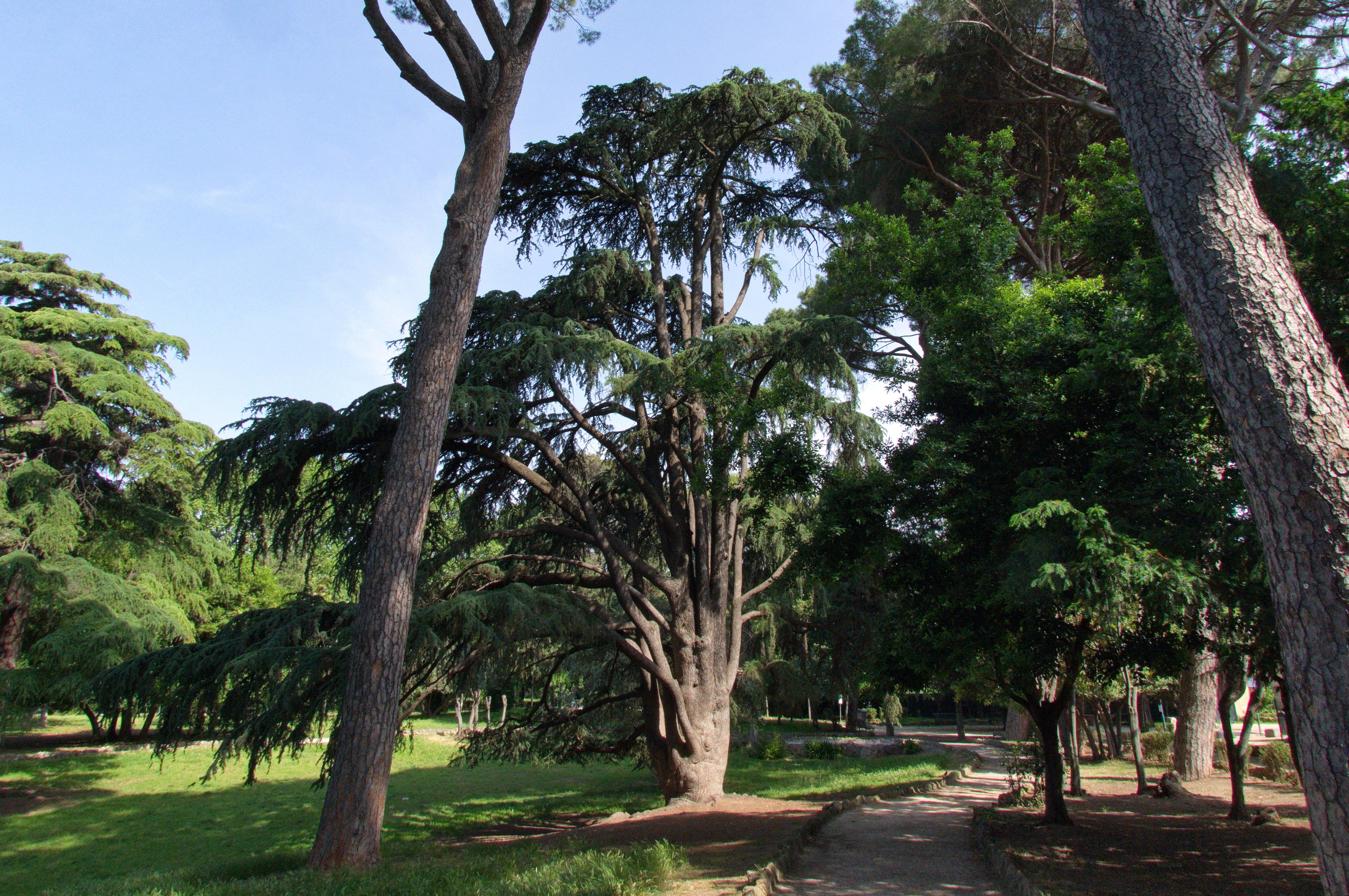
A path through Villa Celimontana with a cedar of Lebanon

In the gardens were displayed artworks from the Mattei collection. In 1552 Filippo Neri instituted the ceremony of Visiting the Seven Churches (San Pietro, San Giovanni in Laterano, Santa Maria Maggiore, San Paolo fuori le mura, San Lorenzo fuori le mura, San Sebastiano all'Appia Antica and Santa Croce in Gerusalemme) and the Mattei family opened their villa's grounds for pilgrims to rest in and provided them with bread, wine, cheese, eggs, apples and salami. The gardens were later redefined by Giovanni Fontana and Domenico Fontana, in a scheme including the obelisk. The gardens were also famous for their fountains, realised by Bernini for Girolamo Mattei – they included the fontana dell'Aquila (after the Mattei's heraldic emblem of the eagle) and fontana del Tritone, and have now all been relocated to the piazza dei SS.Giovanni e Paolo. (Girolamo is also mentioned in the inscription before Santi Giovanni e Paolo relating to its 1651 restoration.)

In 1926 the villa gardens were granted by the state to the Commune of Rome as a public park. The park's current entrance-gate – in bugnata work, dating to the early 17th century and designed by Carlo Lambardi – was formerly the main entrance to Villa Giustiniani before being moved to the present site in 1931. To its left is the obelisk, at the end of the central route.

== Obelisk ==
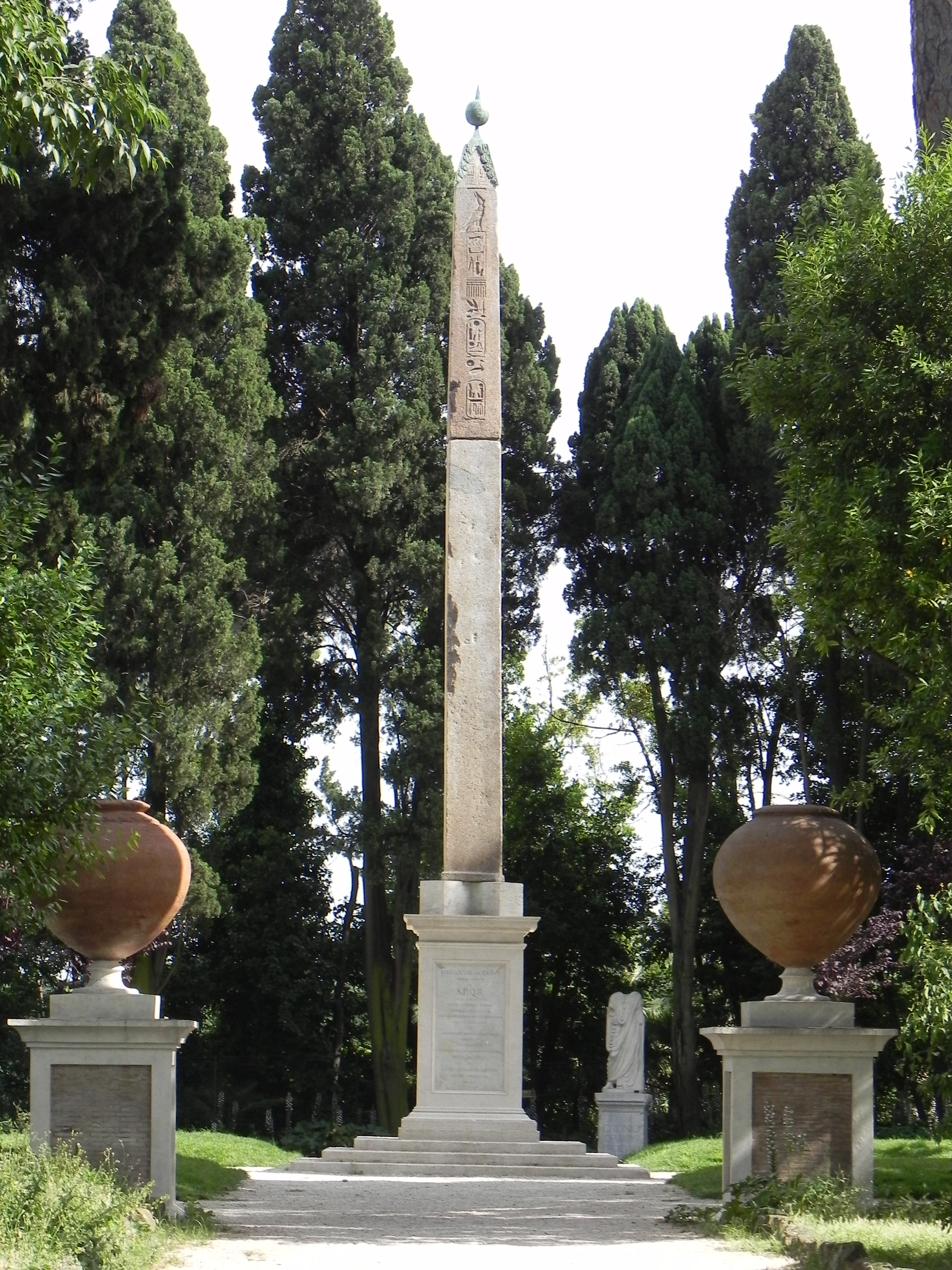
The obelisk.

The obelisk is a small example given to the Mattei in 1582. Its lower part is made up of parts of several obelisks and is of unknown origin, but the top part (2.68m high) has hieroglyphics of Ramesses II, derives from the Temple of the Sun at Heliopolis, and was (like those now in piazza della Minerva and via delle Terme di Diocleziano) brought to Rome in antiquity to adorn the Temple of Isis in Campidoglio. In the 14th century it was placed on the steps of the Campidoglio – legend holds that the globe placed on its tip held the ashes of Augustus and that the obelisk was raised on the Campidoglio by Cola di Rienzo as a symbol of Roman liberty.

It was presented to Ciriaco Mattei in 1582 by the Senate of Rome and moved to the park in 1587 as the centrepiece of the villa's theatre. Manuel de Godoy had the obelisk moved to its present position at the end of the central route by the Spanish architect Antonio Celles in 1817. It was on this occasion that it was placed on its present 16th century base, consisting of 4 lions. In the works a support broke and worker had his hand and part of his arm trapped under the obelisk (where they still remain) – they had to be removed in an emergency amputation.

== See also ==
- List of parks and gardens in Rome
