= Girolamo Mattei, Duca di Giove =

Italian nobleman

Girolamo Mattei (1606 – 16 January 1676) was an Italian nobleman of the House of Mattei and Duke of Giove.

Mattei was born in 1606, the son of Asdrubale Mattei, Marquis di Giove, and his wife Costanza Gonzaga (of the House of Gonzaga). He was the older brother of Luigi Mattei; Marquis di Belmonte and military ally of the Barberini and Pope Urban VIII. He was a nephew of Ciriaco Mattei and Cardinal Girolamo Mattei.

In 1643, Pope Urban VIII issued a papal bull recognising Giove as a Duchy of the Mattei, thus making Girolamo Mattei, Duca di Giove. His bull was issued with the words, affinché la terra sia adorna al titolo più degno (roughly: so that the land may be adorned with the most worthy title).

== Family ==
In 1666 he married Eugenia Spada (1639-1717), sister of Cardinal Fabrizio Spada. He had at least one child, Alessandro Mattei (1670-1729), who inherited his father's titles.
