= Clarence Mattei =

American painter

Clarence R. Mattei
- Born: November 13, 1883; San Luis Obispo County, California, U.S.
- Died: April 2, 1945 (aged 61); Santa Barbara, California, U.S.
- Occupation: Painter
- Spouse: Merle Wilhoit

Clarence R. Mattei (November 13, 1883 – April 2, 1945) was an American portrait painter.

== Life ==
Mattei was born on November 13, 1883, in San Luis Obispo County, California. His father Felix was an immigrant from Switzerland who first managed a hotel in Cayucos before founding Mattei's Tavern in Los Olivos. Mattei was trained in Paris.

Mattei became an oil painter as well as a black and white sketcher, with studios in New York and in Santa Barbara, California. Over the course of his career, he did hundreds of portraits.

Mattei married Merle Wilhoit. He died on April 2, 1945, in Santa Barbara, at age 61. His work can be seen at the Santa Barbara Historical Museum.
