= Ciriaco Mattei =

Italian nobleman

Ciriaco Mattei (died 1614) was an Italian nobleman of Rome and of the House of Mattei and one of the most prolific art collectors of his time.

== Family ==
Mattei was the son of Alessandro Mattei and Emilia Mazzatosta. He was the brother of Cardinal Girolamo Mattei and Asdrubale Mattei, Marquis di Giove (an avid art collector himself). He married Giulia Matuzzi, daughter of Pietro Matuzzi and Isabella, an illegitimate daughter of Pope Alexander VI and they had two sons, Giovanni Batista Mattei and Alessandro Mattei.

== Art collection and residences ==
Mattei and his extended family took up residence at the Palazzo Mattei where they kept portions of their extensive art Collection. He became Conservatore di Roma and in 1582 he began construction on the Villa Celimontana in Rome.

Mattei was a close friend and patron of Michelangelo Merisi da Caravaggio and commissioned a number of works including the Supper at Emmaus, John the Baptist (Youth with a Ram) and The Taking of Christ (for which Mattei and his brother paid 125 scudi). He also supported artists such as Domenico Fiasella.

Mattei left his vast collection to his two sons but they both died before he did. In 1610 he restructured his will to allow for the dissemination of his collection to his nephews and nieces. He added an entail though, stating that no part of the furniture or furnishings considered to be a part of the Villa Mattei should be removed so as to ensure the villa would remain as it had been while he was alive. However, future generations had the entail broken (by Pope Benedict XIV) and the villa's contents were eventually divided and sold.
