= Giove, Umbria =

Giove
- Comune
- Comune di Giove
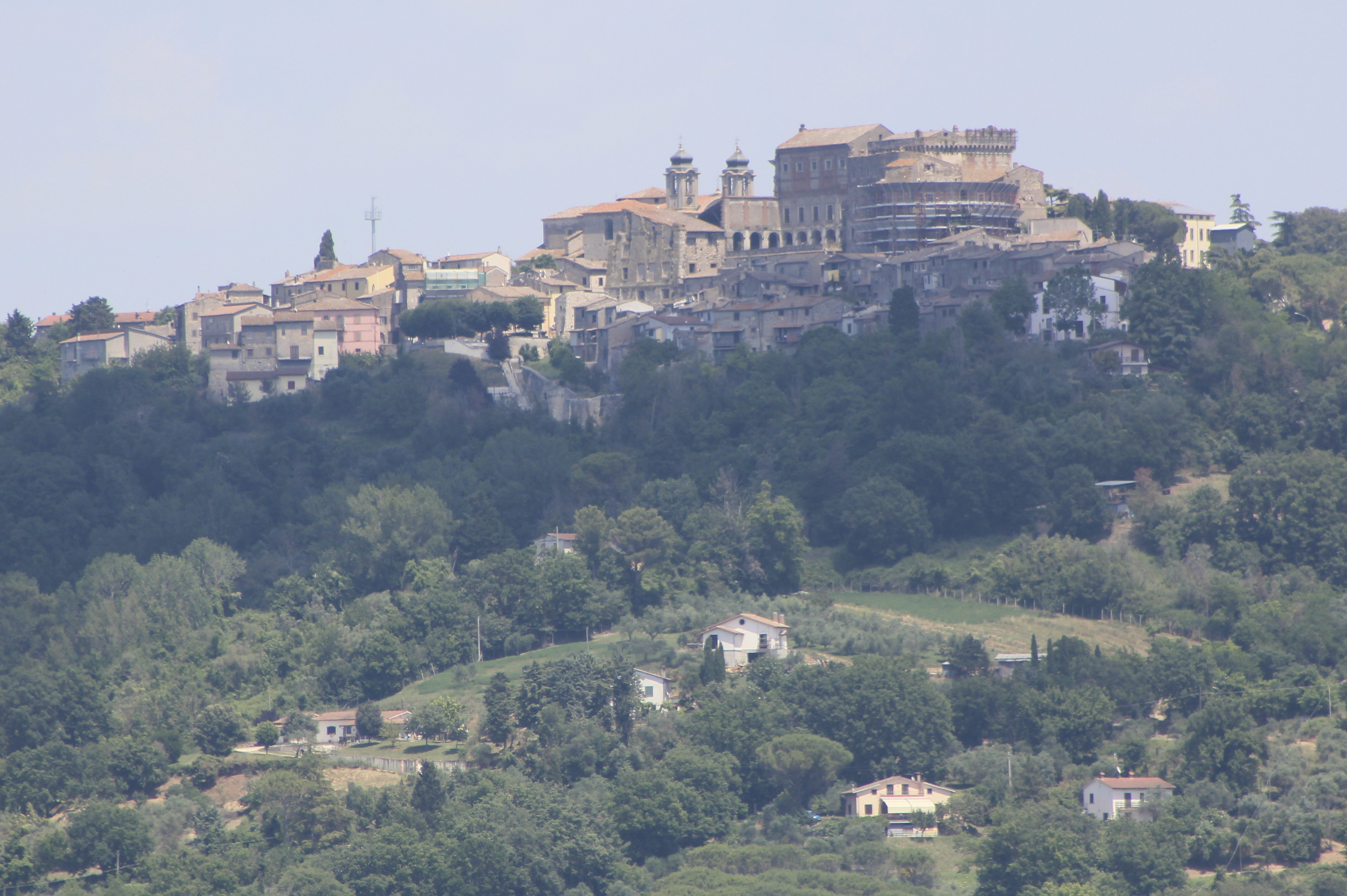
- View of Giove, Umbria

- Coat of arms

- Location of Giove in Italy Giove (Umbria)
- Coordinates: 42.509292°N 12.325257°E
- Country: Italy
- Region: Umbria
- Province: Terni (TR)

Government
  - Mayor: Alvaro Parca

Area
  - Total: 15.19 km^{2} (5.86 sq mi)
- Elevation: 292 m (958 ft)

Population (1 January 2025)
  - Total: 1,842
  - Density: 121.3/km^{2} (314.1/sq mi)
- Demonym: Giovesi
- Time zone: UTC+1 (CET)
  - Summer (DST): UTC+2 (CEST)
- Postal code: 05024
- Dialing code: 0744
- ISTAT code: 055014
- Patron saint: St. John the Baptist
- Saint day: 24 June
- Website: Official website

Giove is a comune in the province of Terni (Umbria, central Italy).

== Etymology ==
The name Giove is derived from a temple dedicated to Zeus.

== History ==
Giove is first recorded in 1191 under the name Juvo, when it was a strategic center contested between Amelia, Todi and Orvieto. In 1223 the local lords swore submission to the municipality of Orvieto. In 1228 further clashes took place with the forces of Amelia and Viterbo.

During the 14th century it was disputed between Orvieto and Benedetto Castani, Count Palatine of Tuscany. In 1328 it was granted to Pietro of Anguillara by the pope.

In the first half of the 15th century it formed part of the feudal possessions of the Anguillara family. Control passed in 1465 to Amelia, which seized the castle and entrusted it to Paolo Farnese. In 1481 Pope Sixtus IV assigned it to Lucrezia Ordelaffi.

During the 16th century Giove was ruled first by the Farnese and then by the Mattei family; in this period a square-plan palace was constructed. In 1545 it was governed by Ottavio Farnese through Contarina Farnese. The first known statute dates to 1557. In 1597 Matteo Farnese sold Giove to Ciriaco and Asdrubale Mattei, and in the late 16th century it was elevated to a marquisate.

In 1643 Pope Urban VIII granted the title of duke to Girolamo Mattei. In 1701, Giove was a feudal domain of the Duke Mattei of Giove, a status which it retained in 1803 under the Duke Mattei. By 1816, it had passed to Cardinal Don Alessandro Mattei.

The arrival of Napoleon's troops in the territory in 1796, led to Giove becoming part of the Department of Trasimene, directly dependent on the imperial government of France.

In 1816 Giove was a baronial place within the district of Terni, in the delegation of Spoleto. Between 1817 and 1827 it was united administratively with Amelia, with Attigliano and Penna as dependent settlements. From 1833 to 1858 it functioned as an autonomous municipality, with a population rising from 842 to 990 inhabitants, though it remained under the administration of Amelia.

In 1860 Giove was annexed to the Kingdom of Italy.

In 1895 the population was 1,233 inhabitants.

== Geography ==
Giove stands on a plateau at an elevation of 292 metres (958 ft) above sea level, on the left bank of the Tiber and about 12 kilometres (7.5 mi) south-west of Amelia. The settlement is circular in form, and enclosed by medieval walls.

The surrounding territory is largely hilly and mountainous, with only a small portion consisting of plains.

The municipality borders Amelia, Attigliano, Bassano in Teverina, Bomarzo, Orte, and Penna in Teverina.

== Economy ==
In the late 19th century the territory of Giove produced wine, oil, cereals and pasture.

== Religion and culture ==
=== Santa Maria Assunta ===
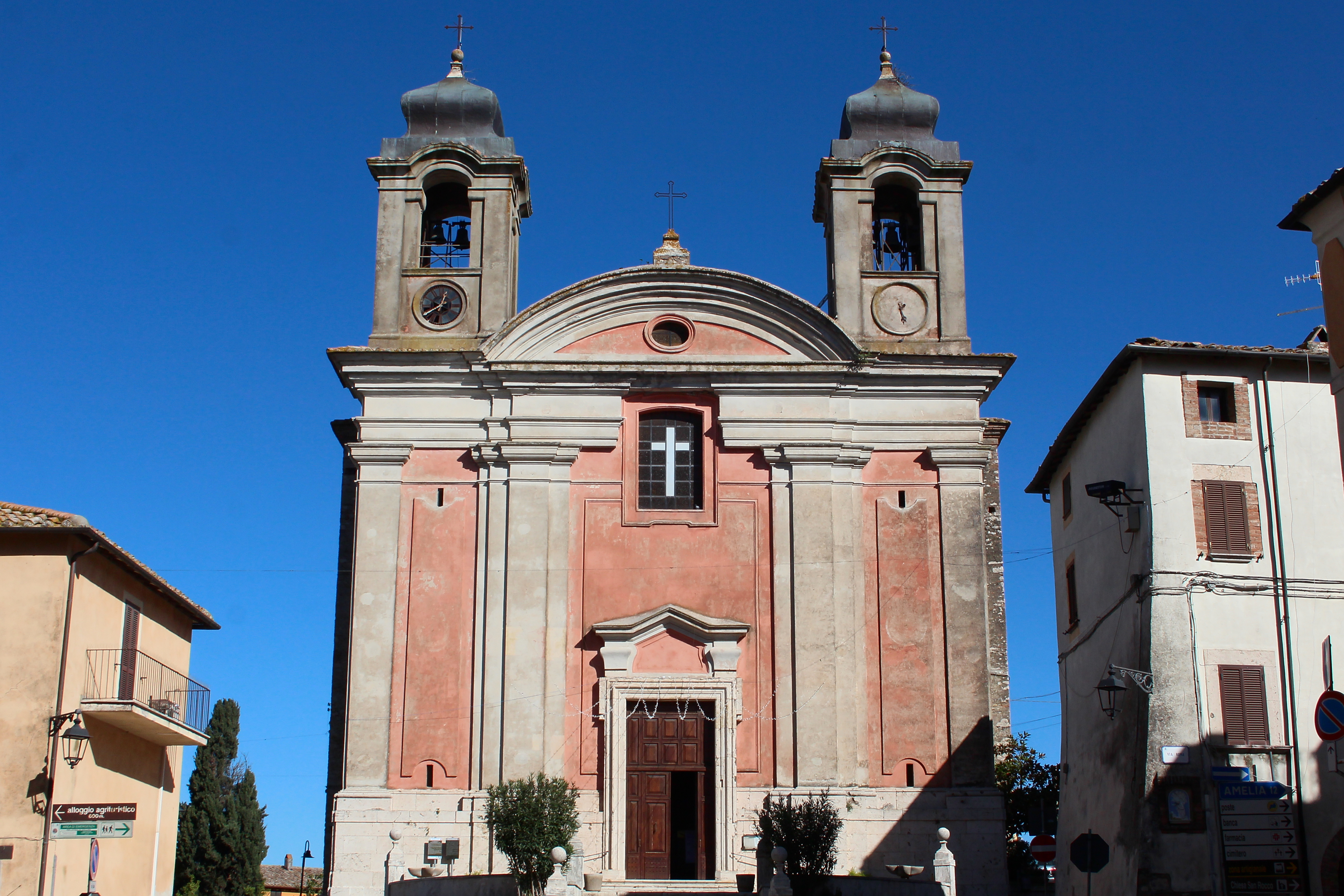
Church of Santa Maria Assunta

The church of Santa Maria Assunta was built in 1740 and has a symmetrical façade between two bell towers. It preserves a panel painting depicting the Madonna Assunta, attributed either to Niccolò Alunno or to his school. The organ above the entrance is said to show technical features that make it one of the more notable instruments in the province.

=== San Rocco ===
The Chapel of San Rocco, situated along the Via Amerina connecting Giove to Amelia, was erected in the 16th century as an offering to the saint invoked against plague. Inside it preserves a cycle of votive paintings attributed to Lorenzo Torresani and Bartolomeo Torresani, partly still covered with whitewash, with iconography associated with anti-plague cycles. A 16th-century fresco of the Foligno school depicts a Crucifixion with the city of Jerusalem in the background. The chapel was later transformed into a memorial to the war dead.

=== Other cultural heritage ===
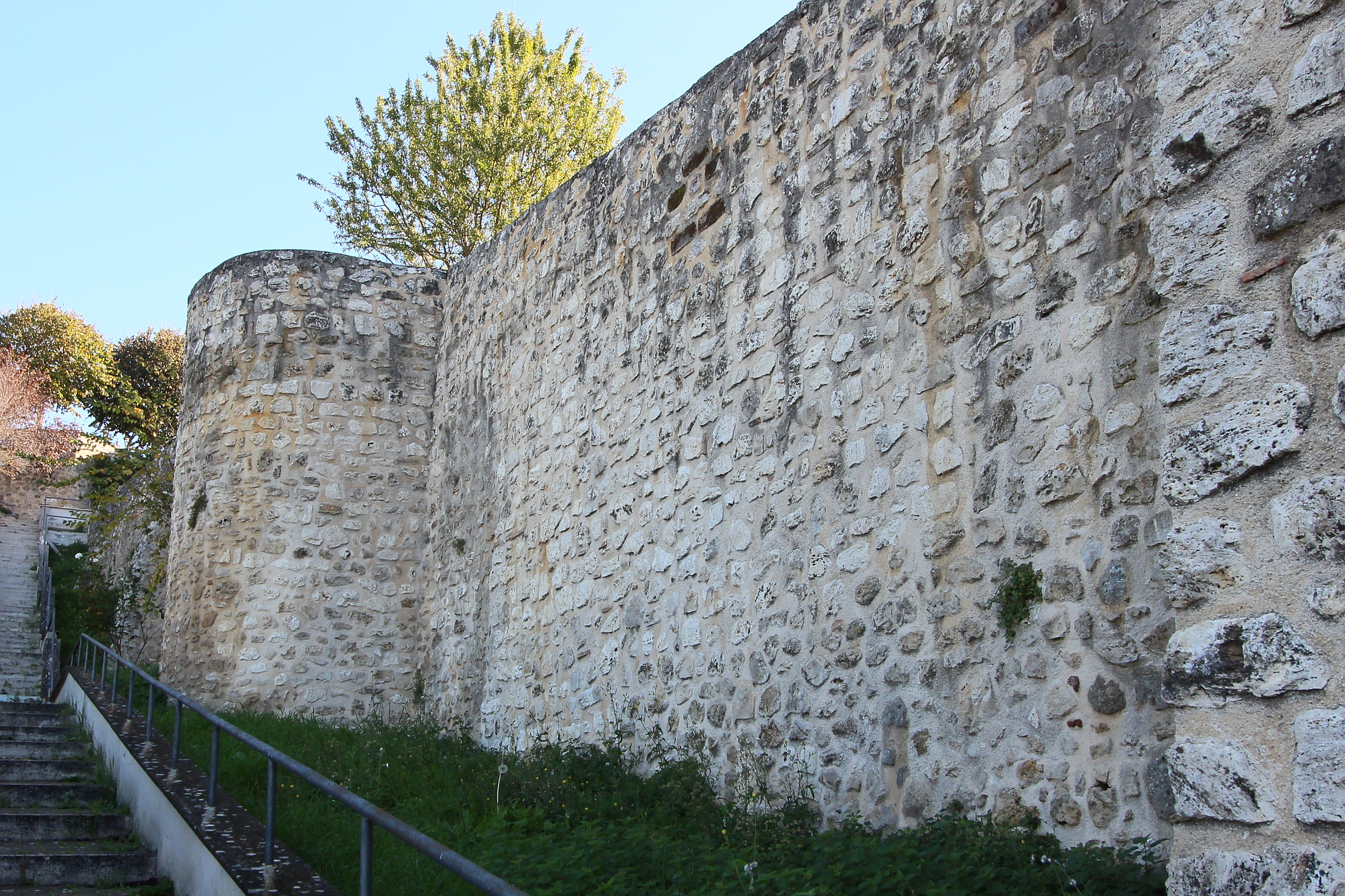
Defensive walls of Giove

Numerous structures attest to Giove's fortified character in the Middle Ages. Sections of the defensive walls survive, in some places doubled, along with covered streets and underground passages leading far beyond the inhabited area.

The entrance gate of Giove bears the monogram IHS of Bernardino of Siena, who preached in the area in the early 15th century.

=== Palazzo Ducale ===
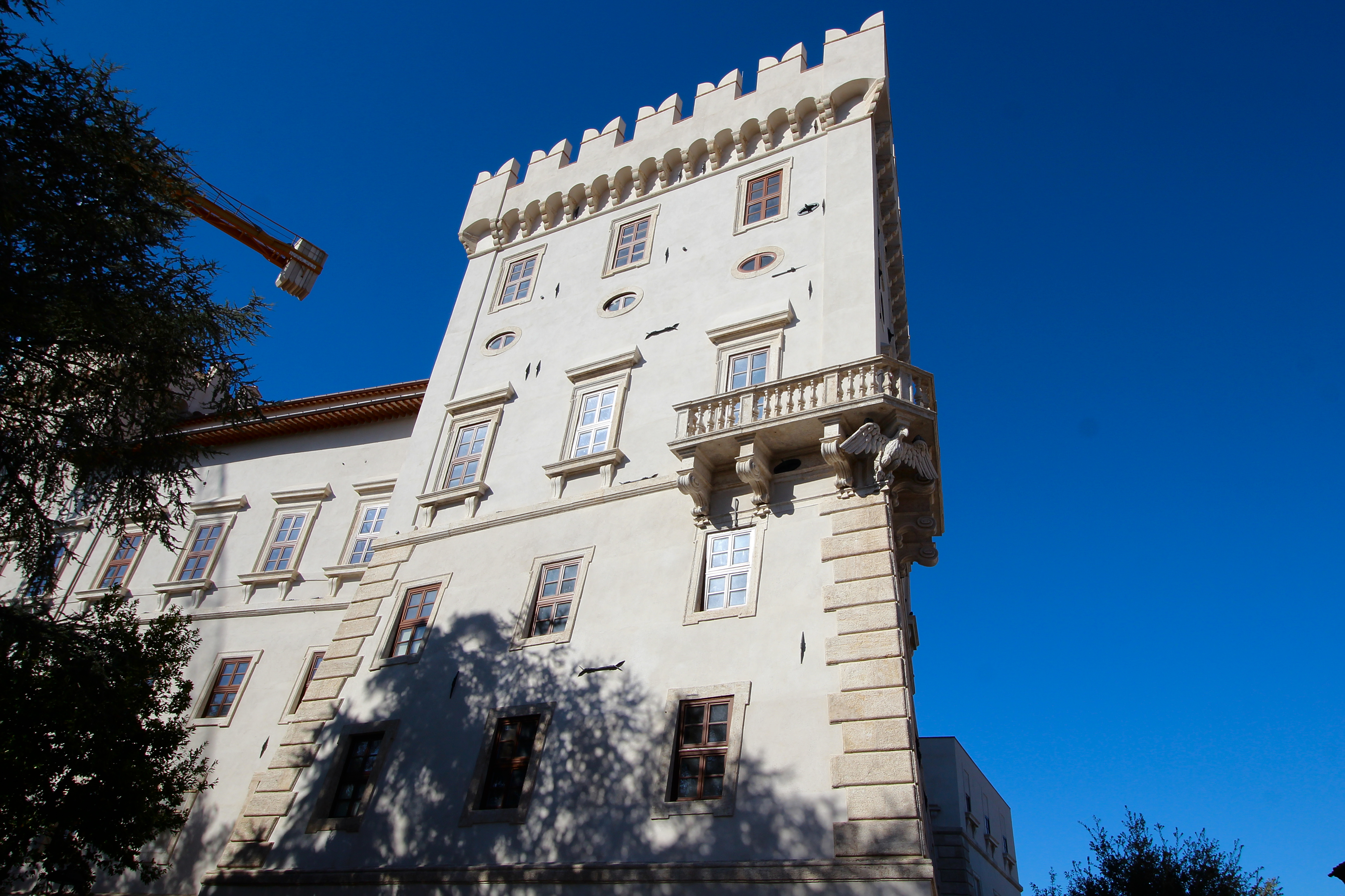
Palazzo Ducale

The Palazzo Ducale, also known as the Castle of Giove, takes its current form from restoration works initiated by the Farnese family in the 16th century and continued by the dukes Ciriaco and Asdrubale Mattei on an older medieval fortification.

The northern section rises six stories and contains the main entrance, while the southern, older section has three stories and a circular tower. A travertine rusticated portal leads into a large hall with Doric columns, and a spiral ramp once allowed carriages to reach the loggia overlooking the Tiber Valley.

A fortified keep stands to the east, crowned by a Ghibelline-style battlemented attic. The third floor contains halls with mythological frescoes of the Bolognese and Ferrarese schools, attributed to Domenico Zampieri, Paolo Caliari, and Orazio Alfani. The fourth floor includes prison rooms with isolation cells and a trapdoor used for executions. The façades have 365 windows, one for each day of the year.

Between September and October 1990, The Pit and the Pendulum was filmed at the palace, and in 1994 the location was used again for the shooting of Castle Freak.

== Notable people ==
The most prominent family in Giove in the 19th century was that of Duke Carlo Canonici Mattei of Ferrara, who owned a large and richly furnished palace in the town.
