= Girolamo Mattei =

Italian cardinal

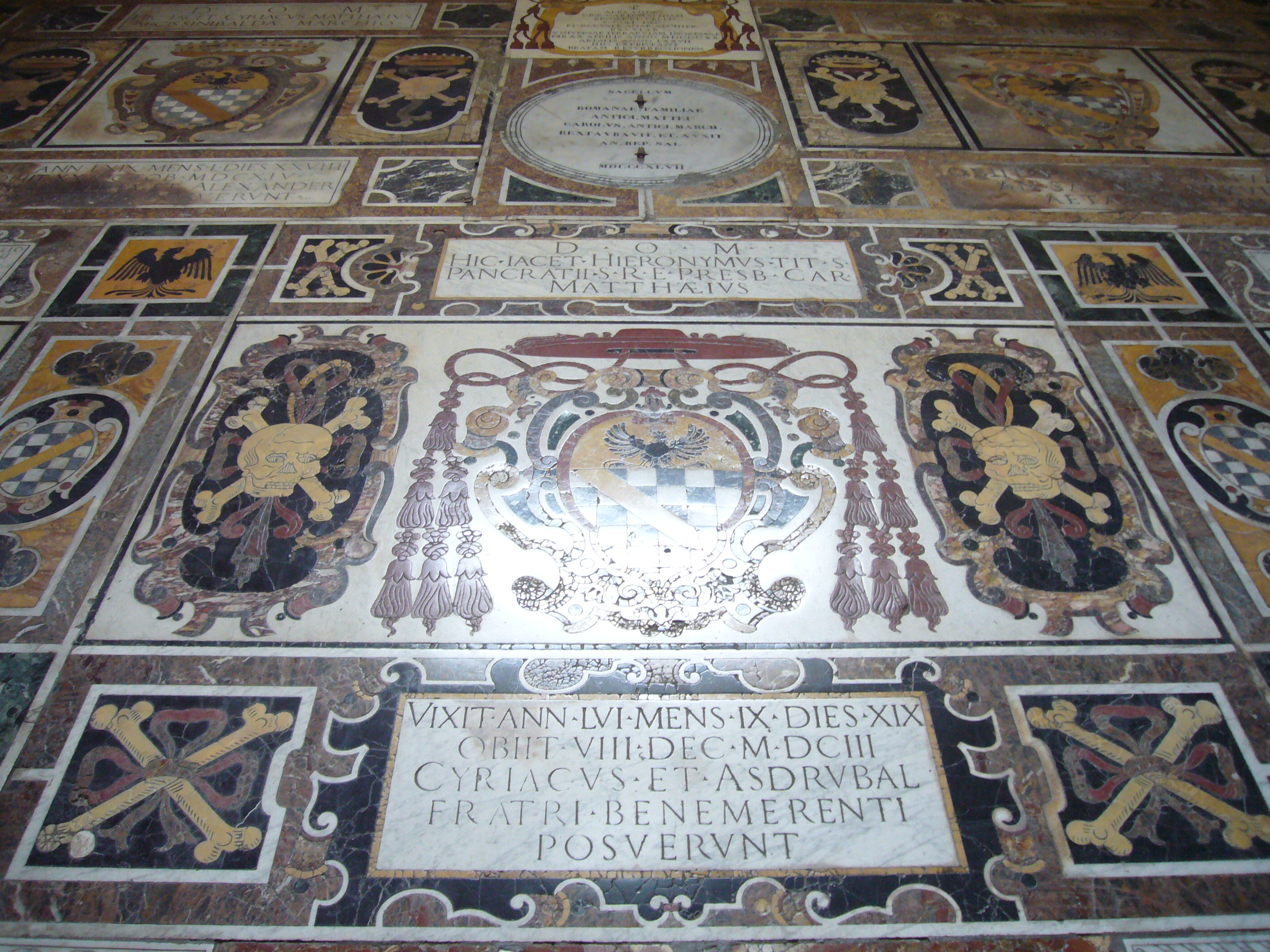
Tomb of Girolamo Mattei (Rome)

Girolamo Mattei (8 February 1547 – 8 December 1603) was an Italian Cardinal from the House of Mattei.

== Biography ==
Mattei was born 8 February 1547, the son of Alessandro Mattei and Emilia Mazzatosta. He was the younger brother of Ciriaco Mattei and the older brother of Asdrubale Mattei, Marquis di Giove. He was uncle to Girolamo Mattei, Duca di Giove and Luigi Mattei, commander of forces loyal to the Pope.

Mattei was raised to cardinal deacon in 1586 with the diaconias of Sant'Adriano al Foro and Sant'Agata dei Goti (1587) then Santa Maria in Cosmedin (1587–89), then the titular church of San Pancrazio fuori le mura from 1592 to 1603.

He participated in the conclaves of 10–30 January 1592 (electing Pope Clement VIII) and also the elections of Pope Innocent IX, Pope Gregory XIV and Pope Urban VII. From 1591 to 1603, he was prefect of the Congregation of the Council.

== See also ==
- House of Mattei
