= List of prime ministers of the Papal States =

Prime Minister of the Papal States
- Style: His Excellency
- Appointer: Pope Pius IX
- Formation: July 17, 1847
- First holder: Cardinal Gabriele Ferretti
- Final holder: Cardinal Carlo Emanuele Muzzarelli
- Abolished: December 26, 1849

This is a list of the prime ministers of the Papal States. Officially, the prime minister was recognized as the Minister of the Interior (Italian: Ministro dell'Interno), as the title of "chief of the government" was reserved to the Cardinal Secretary of State. The office was created by the granting of the Statute of the Papal States in 1848 to 1850, when Pope Pius IX disclaimed the Statute after the Roman Republic's fall in 1849.

== List of prime ministers (1847–1849) ==
Political parties

Clergy
Moderate

Prime Ministers of the Papal States
Portrait	Name (Birth–Death)	Term of office			Party	Pope (Reign)
Portrait	Name (Birth–Death)	Took office	Left office	Time in office	Party	Pope (Reign)
	Cardinal Gabriele Ferretti (1795–1860)	17 July 1847	21 January 1848	188 days	Clergy	Pius IX (1846–1878)
	Cardinal Giuseppe Bofondi (1795–1867)	21 January 1848	10 March 1848	49 days	Clergy	Pius IX (1846–1878)
	Cardinal Giacomo Antonelli (1806–1876)	10 March 1848	4 May 1848	55 days	Clergy	Pius IX (1846–1878)
	Count Terenzio Mamiani della Rovere (1799–1885)	4 May 1848	6 August 1848	94 days	Moderate	Pius IX (1846–1878)
	Count Edoardo Fabbri (1778–1853)	6 August 1848	16 September 1848	41 days	Moderate	Pius IX (1846–1878)
	Pellegrino Rossi (1787–1848)	16 September 1848	15 November 1848	60 days	Moderate	Pius IX (1846–1878)
	Cardinal Carlo Emanuele Muzzarelli (1797–1856)	20 November 1848	25 April 1849	156 days	Clergy	Pius IX (1846–1878)

== See also ==
- List of popes
