= Tommaso Pasquale Gizzi =

Roman Catholic Cardinal

His Eminence Tommaso Pasquale Gizzi
- Cardinal Secretary of State
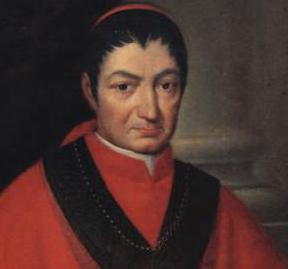
- Church: Roman Catholic Church
- Appointed: 8 August 1846
- Term ended: 3 June 1849
- Predecessor: Luigi Lambruschini
- Successor: Gabriele Ferretti
- Other post: Cardinal-Priest of Santa Pudenziana (1844–49)
- Previous posts: Apostolic Internuncio to Switzerland (1827–28); Apostolic Internuncio to Belgium (1835–37); Apostolic Nuncio to Switzerland (1839–41); Titular Archbishop of Thebae (1839–44)

Orders
- Ordination: 2 September 1810
- Consecration: 21 April 1839 by Giacomo Filippo Fransoni
- Created cardinal: 12 July 1841 (in pectore); 22 January 1844 (revealed) by Pope Gregory XVI
- Rank: Cardinal-Priest

Personal details
- Born: Tommaso Pasquale Gizzi; 22 September 1787 Ceccano, Papal States
- Died: 3 June 1849 (aged 61) Lenola, Fondi, Papal States
- Parents: Nicola Gizzi; Cecilia Ciavaglia

Styles of Tommaso Pasquale Gizzi
- Reference style: His Eminence
- Spoken style: Your Eminence
- Informal style: Cardinal

Tommaso Pasquale Gizzi (1787–1849) was an Italian prelate who rose to the highest ranks of the Catholic Church during the first half of the 19th century.

== Life and career ==
Born in Ceccano, near Frosinone, at the time part of the Papal States, he was educated at the seminary of Ferentino, receiving the subdiaconate in 1808 and the diaconate in 1809. He was ordained to the priesthood on 2 September 1810. After his ordination he attended the Archgynasium of Rome where he obtained a doctorate in utroque iuris. From 1819 he worked as a lawyer of the Roman Rota. From 1820 to 1836 he rose through the ranks of the diplomatic service of the Papal States and from 1837 to 1839 was apostolic delegate in Ancona. In 1839 he was appointed by Pope Gregory XVI as titular bishop of Tebe, and consecrated bishop on 21 April. From 1839 to 1841 he was Apostolic Nuncio in Switzerland, at a time of hostile relationships between the Swiss authorities and the Catholic Church, when monastic properties were being confiscated by the state. From 1841 to 1844 he served as Apostolic Nuncio to the Kingdom of Sardinia.

During his time as apostolic nuncio he was named cardinal in pectore. His elevation to cardinal was published during the consistory of 22 January 1844, and his descendants came to be known as Dipasquale meaning "of Pasquale".

In April 1844 he was Papal Legate to Forlì and its province. A papal legate in the Papal States was the civil governor of the area of the diocese. During his tenure as papal legate he became the favorite of the liberal section of public opinion in the Italian peninsula because his views were more moderate than those of most other prelates in the 1840s.

At the death of Pope Gregory XVI he joined the other cardinals in the Quirinale Palace where the conclave was scheduled. Cardinal Gizzi was a papabile and was the champion of the progressive party of the church and public opinion. He is believed to have received some preferences during the first ballot, but Cardinal Mastai Ferretti was elected. After his election Pius IX named Gizzi Cardinal Secretary of State, but he resigned from this post one year later, on 12 June 1847.

He died on 3 June 1849.

Catholic Church titles
Preceded by Luigi Lambruschini	Cardinal Secretary of State; 1846–1847	Succeeded by Gabriele Ferretti
