= Vincent P. O'Hara =

Naval author and historian

Vincent P. O’Hara (born 24 December 1951) is an American naval author and historian, residing in California.

== Biography ==
Vincent O’Hara is an independent scholar with a degree in History from the University of California, Berkeley. O’Hara has authored, co-authored or edited seventeen books and contributed articles to publications, including Naval War College Review, MHQ, Storia Militare, Warship, Seaforth World Naval Review, America in WWII, World War II, and World War II History. He was an assistant editor of ABC Clio's Encyclopedia of World War II at Sea and has written introductions to two volumes of the U.S. Naval Operations in World War II series by Samuel E. Morison republished by the U.S. Naval Institute. O'Hara was awarded the Naval Institute Press 2015 Author of the Year for Torch: North Africa and the Allied Path to Victory. He participated in the 75th anniversary commemorations of the Torch operation in Algiers and Oran, Algeria at the invitation of the U.S. State Department. O'Hara is a co-founder of the Western Naval History Association. He lives in Chula Vista, California.

== Appraisals ==
- of Six Victories "an up close and personal look at the factors that led to triumph and reversal, told from the perspective of “the hundreds of details that are the true fathers of victory. This work is a significant contribution to the naval history of the Mediterranean theater of World War II and one that students of naval history will surely want on their shelf." Randall D. Fortson, Naval History and Heritage Command. "This is an important work on the struggle for control of the Mediterranean and is recommended for specialists and general readers interested in World War II at sea." Corbin Williamson, Journal of Military History (April 2020). "Despite the vast amount of detail included in the text, this is a very readable work offering a wealth of new information from British and Italian archives. . . . Thoroughly recommended." Derek Law, The Mariner's Mirror (May 2020)
- of Clash of Fleets "an essential companion for anyone with an interest in First World War naval history. It is a highly readable masterpiece, a tour d’horizon of the naval war." Nicholas Jellicoe
- Of Torch, "In sum, the book is simply impressive. Well written and researched . . . O'Hara once again substantiates his reputation as a leading scholar of the Mediterranean theatre of the Second World War." Bernd Horn, Canadian Military Review (Winter 2016). "The book is meticulously researched and well written. The appendices are detailed, providing comprehensive accounts of the French and Allied orders of battle. This work will be of use to scholars who are examining this topic for the first time, as well as those who have expertise in this subject." John Miglietta, Journal of Military History (April 2017).
- Of To Crown the Waves "The greatest value of the work is its systematic comparison of the nature, dynamics, characteristics, and structure of each navy, along with brief battle narratives." Dr. Stanley D. M. Carpenter, Naval History April 2014.
- Of In Passage Perilous, "A very readable account of the convoy battles fought inside the Mediterranean in 1942. Drawing heavily on Italian sources, In Passage Perilous is carefully researched, objective, balanced and well written. It is likely to become the standard account of the critical phase of the Mediterranean conflict." —H. P. Willmott,
- Of On Seas Contested, Warship 2012 wrote, "This is a book that breaks new ground; it is an absolute must for anyone with aspirations to be a naval historian, and a good read for those simply interested in the navies of the Second World War."
- Of Struggle for the Middle Sea, The Washington Times asserted that "It is a welcome and clarifying addition to the existing literature of the Mediterranean campaign."
- In reference to the same book, The Mariner's Mirror stated, "The detail and depth of the research is notable and the ambition to confront old myths with a fresh eye is a worthy one in which he largely succeeds."
- The Journal of Military History wrote "The US Navy Against the Axis helps to fill a void in the history of the Second World War and will prove valuable to any student of naval history."
- Of The German Fleet at War, WWII History Magazine noted "This outstanding book is an invaluable resource for all students of World War II naval history."

== Bibliography ==
- The Greatest Naval War Ever Fought Naval Institute Press (2025) ISBN 9781682479636
- Fighting in the Dark: Naval Combat at Night, 1904-1944 editor with Trent Hone, Naval Institute Press (2023) ISBN 9781682477809
- Innovating Victory: Naval Technology in Three Wars with Leonard R. Heinz, Naval Institute Press (2022) ISBN 9781682477328
- Battleship Tirpitz Naval Institute Press (2022) ISBN 9781591148708
- Heavy Cruiser Prinz Eugen Naval Institute Press (2022) ISBN 9781591148722
- Battleship Massachusetts Naval Institute Press (2021) ISSN 1042-1920
- Six Victories: North Africa, Malta, and the Mediterranean Convoy War November 1941-March 1942 Naval Institute Press (2019) ISBN 978-1-68247-460-0
- Clash of Fleets: Naval Battles of the Great War, 1914–18 with Leonard R. Heinz, Naval Institute Press (2017) ISBN 978-1-68247-008-4
- Torch: North Africa and the Allied Path to Victory Naval Institute Press (2015) ISBN 978-1-61251-823-7
- Black Phoenix: History and Operations of the Marina Repubblicana 1943–1945, with Enrico Cernuschi, Propeller (2014) ISBN 978-0-615-97861-1
- To Crown the Waves: The Great Navies of the First World War, edited with W. David Dickson and Richard Worth, Naval Institute Press (2013) ISBN 978-1-61251-082-8
- The Royal Navy's Revenge and Other Little-Known Encounters of the War at Sea, Nimble Books LLC (2013) ISBN 978-1-60888-113-0
- In Passage Perilous: Malta and the Convoy Battles of June 1942, Indiana University Press (2012) ISBN 978-0-253-00603-5
- On Seas Contested: The Seven Great Navies of the Second World War, edited with W. David Dickson and Richard Worth, Naval Institute Press (2010) ISBN 978-1-59114-646-9
- Dark Navy: The Italian Regia Marina and the Armistice of 8 September 1943, with Enrico Cernuschi, Nimble Books LLC (2009) ISBN 978-1-934840-91-7
- Struggle for the Middle Sea: The Great Navies At War In The Mediterranean Theater, 1940–1945, Naval Institute Press and Conway Publishing (2009) ISBN 978-1-84486-102-6
- The U.S. Navy Against the Axis: Surface Combat, 1941–1942, Naval Institute Press (2007) ISBN 978-1-59114-650-6
- The German Fleet At War: 1939–1945, Naval Institute Press (2004) ISBN 978-1-59114-651-3
