= Legion of Antibes =

Formation of Papal Army created in 1866

The Legion of Antibes, also known as the Roman Legion, was a formation of the Papal Army created on 8 September 1866 consisting of French volunteers.

== History ==
The Legion was recruited under direction of Pope Pius IX's secretary of state, Cardinal Giacomo Antonelli, following the September Convention of 1864, to replace French troops garrisoned in Rome, during the closing phase of Italian unification, the Risorgimento. The September Convention permitted the Pope to keep an army, but it did not give Napoleon III the right to continue to maintain forces in Rome, supporting papal temporal power in the rump Papal States.

After the battle of Mentana, fought on 3 November 1867 between French-Papal troops and the Italian volunteers, led by Giuseppe Garibaldi, it became public knowledge that the "Legion" was composed of French Imperial recruits from Antibes lying on the Mediterranean coast close to the border with Piedmont. Its "services to the Pope were rendered as services to the French Empire", the former Prime Minister of Italy, Francesco Crispi recalled in 1891. "It is singular that on the dead bodies were found livrets (pay books) from French regiments, to which every one of these men belonged, with the number of his matriculation, and with formula of the oath of fidelity to the Emperor".

No formal denunciation of French intervention so contrary to the spirit of the September Convention was lodged, however. A frank remark of the French minister Jules Favre with the Italian ambassador Costantino, Count Nigra, 6 September 1874, allowed the obvious: "The convention of September 15th is very dead".

Antonelli continued to call for the Catholic powers of Europe to come to the aid of the Pope, but there was no response.

== Strength ==
Originally composed of six, later eight light infantry companies, after the Mentana, the Legion was expanded to two battalions, each with one Depot and six active companies. During the Franco-Prussian War, any soldier desiring to return to fight for France could do so, and the fifth and sixth companies of each battalion disbanded.
