= Giuseppe Bofondi =

Italian cardinal

- Cardinal Secretary of State
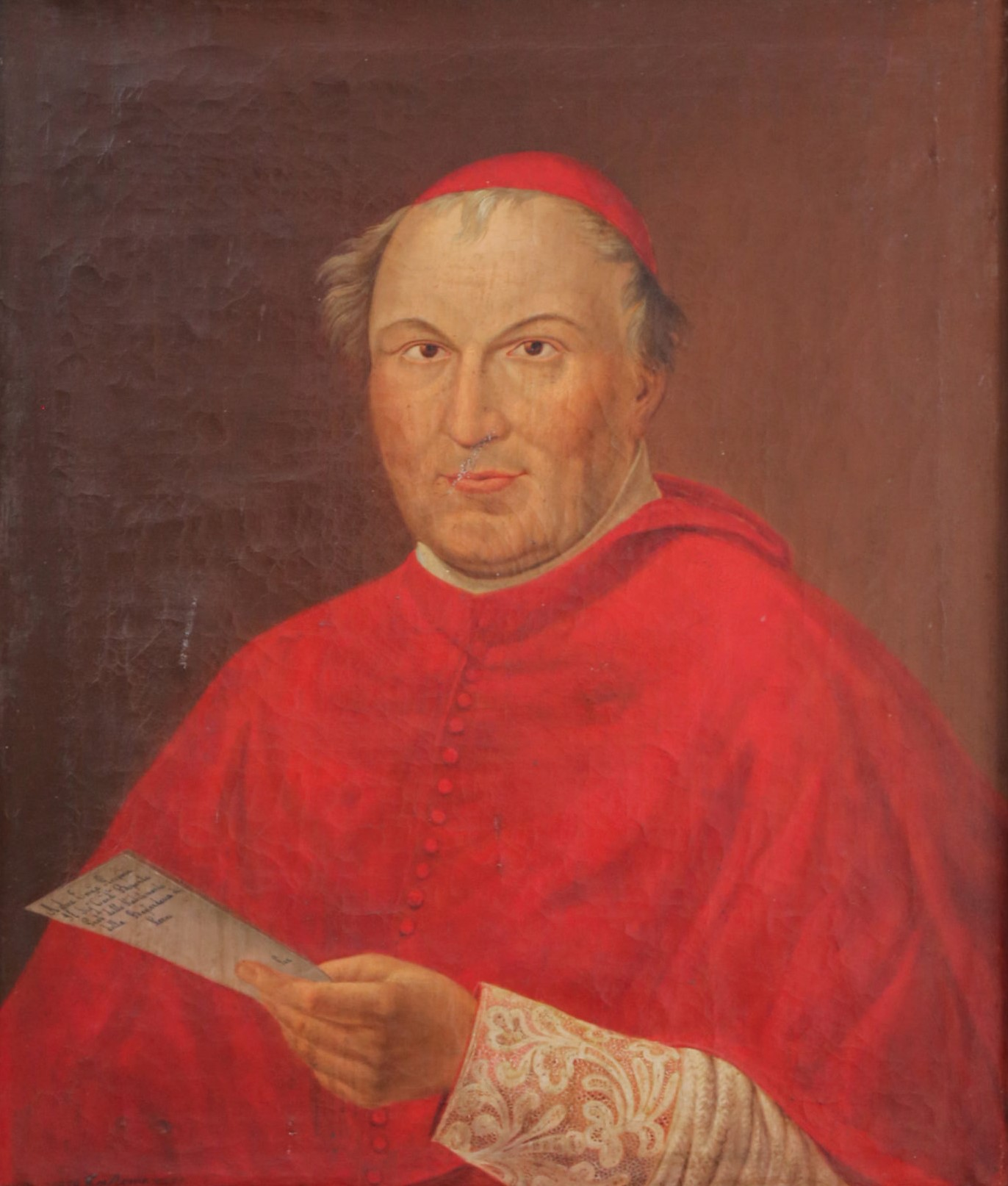
- Church: Roman Catholic Churcf
- Appointed: 2 January 1848
- Installed: 1 February 1848
- Retired: 10 March 1848
- Predecessor: Gabriele Ferretti
- Successor: Giacomo Antonelli

Orders
- Created cardinal: 21 December 1846 by Pope Pius IX

Personal details
- Born: 24 October 1795 Forlì, Papal States
- Died: 2 December 1867 (aged 72) Rome, Papal States

Giuseppe Bofondi (24 October 1795 – 2 December 1867) was an Italian cardinal of the Catholic Church. He served as Cardinal Secretary of State and Papal Minister of the Interior (Note: The Minister of the Interior was effectively prime minister of the Papal States.) from February to March 1848.

== Biography ==
Bofondi was born on 24 October 1795 in Forlì, the son of the former president of the municipality and grandson of Lorenzo Romagnoli, who was the governor of the prefecture. He decided to enter the ecclesiastical field and studied in Bologna, where he graduated utroque iure 1817, then began practicing at the Roman Curia. He was appointed referendary of the Two Segnatures and auditor of the Sacred Rota for Romagna by Pope Pius VII in 1822. He became the dean of the Sacred Rota for Romagna on 24 January 1842. He also was named a domestic prelate in 1823, then became vicar general of Card. Pacca in 1830.

Open to liberal ideas, Bofondi was viewed favorably by the new Pope Pius IX for his support of the latter's reforms. He was among the first four cardinals appointed by Pius XI, being named in pectore on 21 December 1846. He was proclaimed cardinal on 11 June 1847, and became the deacon of S. Cesario, a member of the Council and of the congregations of Bishops and Regulars. In December 1847, he was sent to be cardinal legate of Romagna. On 2 January 1848, he was appointed by Pius IX to be the Cardinal Secretary of State. His appointment was made amid rising tensions in the Papal States, with the two prior Secretaries of State having both resigned after tenures of less than a year, and he took office on 1 February 1848 as the Revolutions of 1848 began to take place. As he assumed office, he was also given the positions of Foreign Minister and Papal Minister of the Interior, effectively prime minister.

Bofondi immediately had to deal with protests in the streets advocating for government reform. He discussed plans of "cautious reforms" with the help of moderates and the advice of Giuseppe Pasolini, which briefly put a stop to the demonstrations. On 12 February, the cabinet was changed following a motu proprio by Pius IX which "aroused so much enthusiasm". Two days later, a commission was created to help draft a constitution, to clarify the powers and limits of the Papal ministry, with Bofondi serving on it with several others.

As protests continued, he thought to reorganize the army "by calling officers from outside the State to command positions"; however, shortly afterwards revolution broke out in Paris and under the pressure of the riots, Bofondi resigned effective 10 March 1848, being replaced by Giacomo Antonelli. In December, after the overthrow of the Papal States, Bofondi fled to Gaeta with Pius IX, before returning after the States were restored in 1850.

After returning, Bofondi was appointed the president of the Census in 1851 and became a member of the Congregation of Studies. As president of the census, he helped create a revision of the land registry program in 1856 to better distribute land taxes. He wrote a work on the land registries and census which was published in 1862. In his later years, he was regarded as "the most liberal member of the Sacred College, and least opposed to the Italian Government," according to one source. Bofondi died on 2 December 1867, at the age of 72, in Rome.
