= Antonio Maria Cagiano de Azevedo =

Catholic cardinal (1797–1867)

His Eminence Antonio Maria Cagiano de Azevedo
- Major Penitentiary of the Apostolic Penitentiary
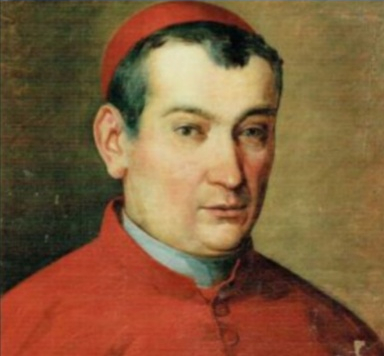
- Antonio Maria Cagiano de Azevedo
- Church: Roman Catholic Church
- Appointed: 28 September 1860
- Term ended: 13 January 1867
- Predecessor: Gabriele Ferretti
- Successor: Antonio Maria Panebianco
- Other post: Cardinal-Bishop of Frascati (1854–67)
- Previous posts: Bishop of Senigallia (1844–48); Cardinal-Priest of Santa Croce in Gerusalemme (1844–54); Prefect of the Congregation of the Council (1853–60); Camerlengo of the College of Cardinals (1855–56)

Orders
- Ordination: 10 August 1824
- Consecration: 11 February 1844 by Pope Gregory XVI
- Created cardinal: 22 January 1844 by Pope Gregory XVI
- Rank: Cardinal-Priest (1844–54); Cardinal-Bishop (1844–54)

Personal details
- Born: Antonio Maria Cagiano de Azevedo; 14 December 1797 Santopadre, Aquino, Papal States
- Died: 13 January 1867 (aged 69) Rome, Papal States
- Buried: Santa Croce in Gerusalemme
- Parents: Ottavio Cagiano de Azevedo; Mariangela Zagaroli
- Education: Pontifical Academy of Ecclesiastical Nobles
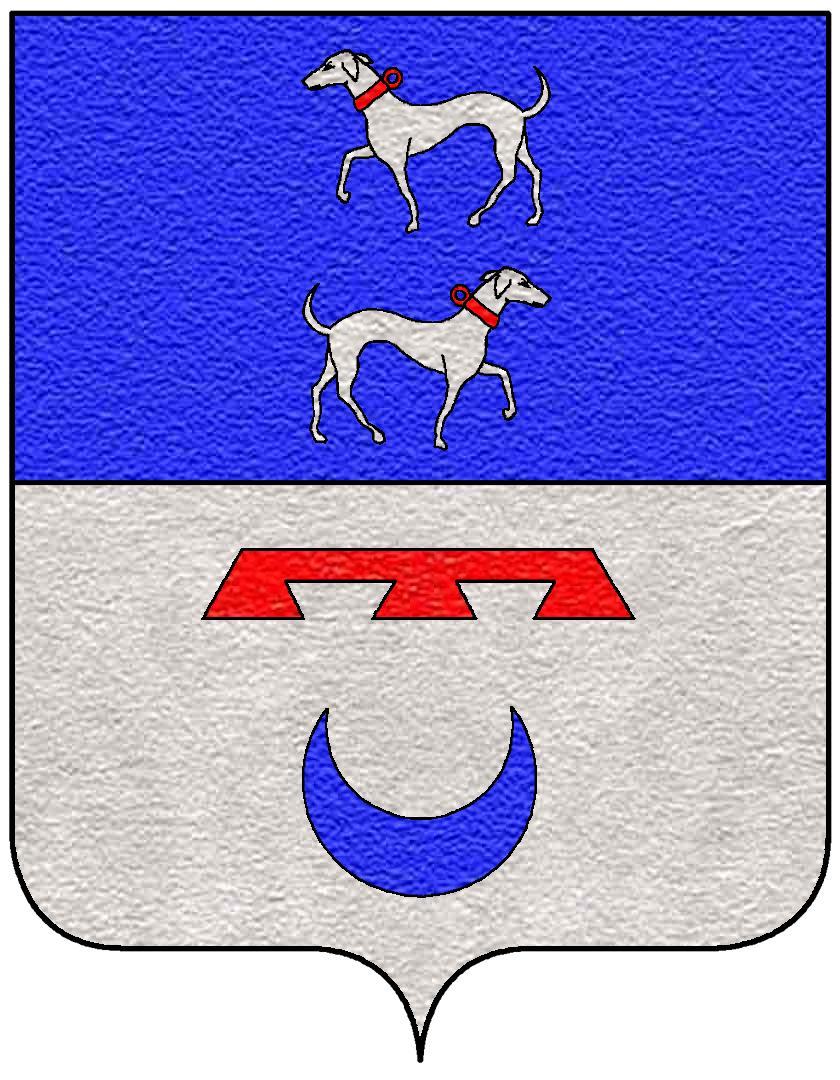
- Coat of arms

Antonio Maria Cagiano de Azevedo (14 December 1797 – 13 January 1867) was a Catholic Cardinal and held a number of significant legal positions within the Catholic Church during the 19th century.

== Personal life ==
Cagiano was born 14 December 1797 in Santopadre to a noble family; he was the son of Ottavio Cagiano de Azevedo. Cagiano was the uncle of Cardinal Ottavio Cagiano de Azevedo.

He was educated at the Pontifical Academy of Ecclesiastical Nobles in Rome then at the Archgymnasium of Rome where he received a doctorate in utroque iuris (civil and canon law).

== Ecclesiastical service ==
Cagiano was ordained in 1824 and was immediately appointed to a number of politico-legal positions in quick succession including:

- Secretary to the dean of the Sacred Roman Rota.
- Member of the college of consistorial lawyers.
- Domestic prelate of Pope Pius VIII.
- Assessore criminale of the auditor general of the Apostolic Chamber and of the governor of Rome.
- Auditor of the Tribunal of Signature of Justice.
- Protonotary apostolic.
- Governor of the city of Spoleto.
- President of the province of Perugia.
- Pro-legate in Ferrara.
- Secretary of the Sacred Consulta.
- Vice-president of the Board of Health.
- Rector of La Sapienza University in Rome.
- Secretary of the S.C. Consistorial.
- Auditor general of the Apostolic Chamber.

He was elected bishop of Senigaglia in 1844 and was consecrated by Pope Gregory XVI.

== Cardinalate ==
Cagiano was elevated to cardinal in 1844 and was appointed Cardinal Priest of the Basilica of the Holy Cross in Jerusalem.

He participated in the Papal Conclave of 1846 which elected Pope Pius IX.

He was appointed Prefect of the Sacred Congregation of the Council in 1853 and held the position until 1860. In 1854 Cagiano was appointed Cardinal-Bishop of Frascati where he served until his death. Between 1855 and 1856 he was appointed Camerlengo of the Sacred College of Cardinals and in 1860 he was appointed Apostolic Penitentiary, a position which he also held until his death.

== Death ==
Cagiano died 13 January 1867 in Rome. His funeral took place on 16 January 1867, with the participation of Pope Pius IX and he was buried in the Santa Croce in Gerusalemme.

Catholic Church titles
| Preceded by Alessandro Giustiniani | Cardinal Priest of the Basilica of the Holy Cross in Jerusalem; 1844–1854 | Succeeded by János Scitovszky |
| Preceded by Angelo Mai | Prefect of the Sacred Congregation of the Council; 1853–1860 | Succeeded by Prospero Caterini |
| Preceded by Mario Mattei | Cardinal-Bishop of Frascati; 1854–1867 | Succeeded by Niccola Paracciani Clarelli |
| Preceded by Gabriele Ferretti | Camerlengo of the Sacred College of Cardinals; 1855–1856 | Succeeded by Benedetto Barberini |
| Preceded by Gabriele Ferretti | Apostolic Penitentiary; 1860–1867 | Succeeded by Antonio Maria Panebianco |
