= Benedetto Barberini =

Italian Cardinal

His Eminence Benedetto Barberini
- Cardinal Protopriest
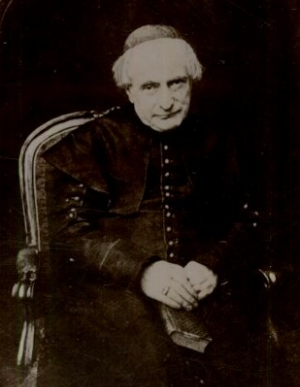
- Church: Roman Catholic Church
- Appointed: 20 April 1856
- Term ended: 10 April 1863
- Predecessor: Giacomo Filippo Fransoni
- Successor: Antonio Tosti
- Other posts: Cardinal-Priest of Santa Maria in Trastevere in commendum (1832–63); Archpriest of the Basilica of Saint John Lateran (1844–63); Cardinal-Priest of San Lorenzo in Lucina (1856–63)
- Previous posts: Cardinal-Priest of Santa Maria sopra Minerva (1829–32); Camerlengo of the College of Cardinals (1856–57)

Orders
- Created cardinal: 2 October 1826 (in pectore); 15 December 1828 (revealed) by Pope Leo XII
- Rank: Cardinal-Priest

Personal details
- Born: Benedetto Barberini Colonna di Sciarra; 22 October 1788 Rome, Papal States
- Died: 10 April 1863 (aged 74) Rome, Papal States
- Buried: Sant'Andrea della Valle
- Parents: Carlo Maria Barberini; Giustina Borromeo Arese

Benedetto Barberini (22 October 1788 – 10 April 1863) was a Catholic Cardinal and Camerlengo of the Sacred College of Cardinals.

== Personal life ==
Barberini was born 22 October 1788, the youngest of ten children to his father Carlo Maria Barberini of the Barberini family, duke of Montelibretti and prince of Palestrina who assumed the last name Colonna di Sciarra after the merger of the two families. His mother was Countess Giustina Borromeo Arese.

As such, Barberini is also listed in some records as Benedetto Barberini Colonna di Sciarra.

He was the Grand-nephew of Cardinals Girolamo Colonna di Sciarra and Prospero Colonna di Sciarra.

== Ecclesiastical service ==
Barberini entered the Roman prelature and was named domestic prelate to the Pope in 1820.

He was also appointed Relator of the Sacred Consulta of Good Government in 1820 and Secretary of the Sacred Consulta of the Discipline of the Regulars in 1822.

In 1823 he was appointed Prefect of the Household of His Holiness, a post he occupied for the next five years.

== Cardinalate ==
Barberini was elevated to cardinal (in pectore) in 1826 but was not revealed as such until 1828

He was appointed Prefect of the Sacred Consulta of Ecclesiastical Immunity in 1834, a position he occupied until his death.

In 1844 he was appointed Archpriest of the Basilica of St. John Lateran.

He was appointed Camerlengo of the Sacred College of Cardinals between 1856 and 1857.

In 1862 he was appointed both Secretary of Apostolic Briefs and Grand Chancellor of the Pontifical Equestrian Orders.

== Papal conclaves ==
Barberini participated in 3 papal conclaves:

- The Papal Conclave of 1829 which elected Pope Pius VIII.
- The Papal Conclave of 1830-1831 which elected Pope Gregory XVI.
- The Papal Conclave of 1846 which elected Pope Pius IX

== Death ==
Barberini died on 10 April 1863. His body lay in state in the church of S. Lorenzo in Lucina. Pope Pius IX participated in his funeral and he was buried in his family's chapel in the church of Sant'Andrea della Valle.

Barberini was the last surviving cardinal of Pope Leo XII, and the last participant in the conclaves that elected Pope Pius VIII and that elected Pope Gregory XVI.

Catholic Church titles
Preceded by Bartolomeo Pacca	Archpriest of the Basilica of St. John Lateran; 28 April 1844 – 10 April 1863	Succeeded by Lodovico Altieri
Preceded by Antonio Maria Cagiano de Azevedo	Camerlengo of the Sacred College of Cardinals; 1856–1857	Succeeded by Ugo Pietro Spinola
