= Pellegrino Rossi =

Italian economist, politician and jurist (1787–1848)

Count Peer Pellegrino Rossi
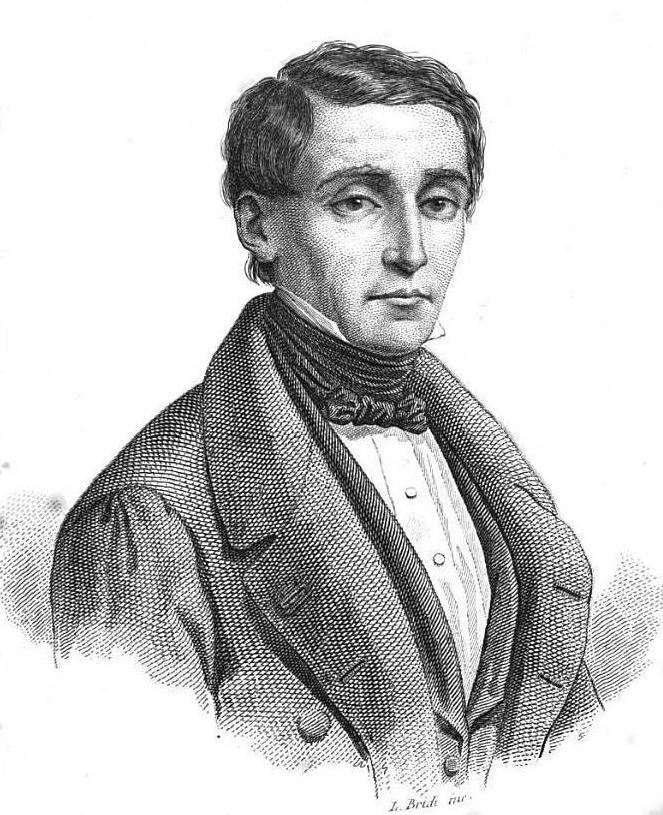

6th Papal Minister of Interior
- In office 10 September 1848 – 15 November 1848
- Monarch: Pope Pius IX
- Preceded by: Edoardo Fabbri
- Succeeded by: Carlo Emanuele Muzzarelli

Minister of Finance
- In office 16 September 1848 – 15 November 1848
- Monarch: Pope Pius IX
- Preceded by: Position created
- Succeeded by: Position abolished

Member of the French Chamber of Peers
- In office 1838 – 15 November 1848
- Monarch: Louis Philippe I

Personal details
- Born: 13 July 1787 Carrara, Tuscany (now Italy)
- Died: 15 November 1848 (aged 61) Rome, Papal States (now Italy)
- Resting place: San Lorenzo in Damaso, Rome
- Party: Moderate
- Education: University of Pisa; University of Bologna
- Profession: Teacher, economist, diplomat

Military service
- Branch/service: Neapolitan Army
- Years of service: 1815
- Rank: Soldier
- Battles/wars: Neapolitan War

Pellegrino Luigi Odoardo Rossi (13 July 1787 – 15 November 1848) was an Italian economist, politician and jurist. He was an important figure of the July Monarchy in France, and the minister of justice in the government of the Papal States, under Pope Pius IX.

== Early life ==
Rossi was born in Carrara, then under the Duchy of Massa and Carrara. Educated at the University of Pisa and the University of Bologna, he became a professor of law at the latter in 1812. In 1815, he supported Joachim Murat's Neapolitan anti-Austrian expedition. The text of the Rimini Proclamation, an early document calling for Italian unification, is widely attributed to Rossi. After Murat fell, he fled to France and then to Geneva. In Geneva, he taught a successful course of jurisprudence applied to Roman law. His success earned him the rare honour of naturalization as a citizen of Geneva. In 1820, he was elected as a deputy to the cantonal council, and was a member of the diet of 1832. Rossi was entrusted with the task of drawing up a revised constitution, which was known as the Pacte Rossi. This was rejected by a majority of the population, a result which deeply affected Rossi and made him accept the invitation of François Guizot to settle in France.

Here he was appointed in 1833 to the chair of political economy in the Collège de France, vacated by the death of Jean-Baptiste Say. He was naturalized as a French citizen in 1834, and in the same year became professor of constitutional law in the faculty of law of the Paris University. In 1836 he was elected a member of the Academy of Political and Moral Sciences, was raised to the French peerage in 1839, and in 1843 became dean of the faculty of law.

In 1842, Rossi and Count Ferdinand-Charles-Philippe d' Esterno (1805–83) organized the first meetings of what would become the Société d'économie politique.

In 1845, Guizot appointed Rossi as ambassador of France to the Papal States, with a specific mission to discuss the question of the Jesuits. However, the French Revolution of 1848 toppled Guizot's regime, and the revolution in Italy fully severed Rossi's connection with France. Rossi thus remained in Rome, and there became Minister of the Interior under Pope Pius IX.

== Papal States minister ==
In the Papal States, Rossi's program of liberal reforms was never put into practice. Rossi's program of moderate liberalism, in which suffrage was to be limited to the well-off and the economic and social disruptions created by industrialization went unaddressed, had narrow appeal. Rossi attempts to mediate reform, were blocked by the reactionary clerical party, and rebuffed as paltry by the rising revolutionary sentiment. In addition, the notion of a united Italy as a federation, kingdom, or republic was proposed by the diverse forces; however, some of these ideas clearly threatened the temporal power of various rulers.

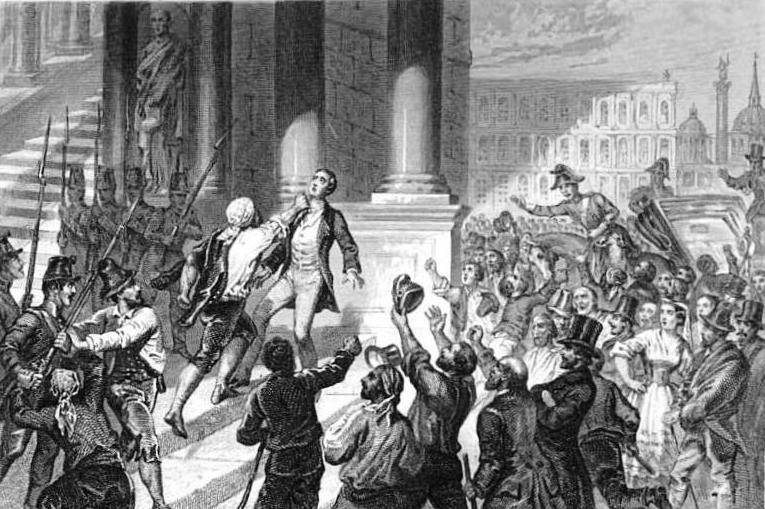
Murder of Pellegrino Rossi

On 15 November 1848, Rossi was going to preside over the opening of the Parliament in the Palazzo della Cancelleria. After exiting his carriage and walking towards the entrance, he was killed by an assassin who stabbed him in the neck. The pope, seeing the inevitable imposition of democracy for his state, fled from Rome, leading to the proclamation of the Roman Republic.

After the murder, the Senate adjourned without much sorrow and little to no attention to the murder victim. That night, crowds at the house of Rossi's widow chanted Blessed is the hand that stabbed the Rossi. In a trial held in 1854, a man by the name of Gabriele Constantini was convicted and executed as the murderer. However, the true murderer is said to be Luigi Brunetti, the elder son of Angelo Brunetti (or Ciceruacchio), who acted at the instigation of Pietro Sterbini, and with the cooperation of some veterans or reduci of the conflict in Lombardy, under the name of Carbonari. Sterbini went on to play a prominent role in the Roman Republic in 1849 but fled into exile after its fall until 1861.

The city of Carrara erected a statue in honour of Pellegrino Rossi.

== Personal life and ideas ==
Rossi had a Protestant wife, a resident of Geneva. The most important of Rossi's writings is his Cours d'économie politique, a classic work, based on the theories of Smith, Say, Malthus, and Ricardo. Like these authors, he favoured freedom of trade, labour, and manufacture; and in general, not clearly foreseeing the difficulties of economic life, he wished to solve them by the free play of individual force and intelligence rather than by legislation. Still, he recognized the great economic utility of associations. A characteristic aspect of his scientific philosophy was his fondness for considering social phenomena from a mathematical perspective, Rossi attaching great importance to statistics in his analysis. This tendency gave him the nickname "geometrician of economy". As a statesman, he was the father of the principle of non-intervention and published an essay on the subject.

== Selected works ==
- Cours d'économie politique (1838–54)
- Traité de droit pénal (1829)
- Cours de droit constitutionnel (1866–67)
- Melanges d'économie politique, d'histoire et de philosophie (1857, 2 volumes)

== Bibliography ==
- Lacchè, Luigi (2017). "ROSSI, Pellegrino". Dizionario Biografico degli Italiani (in Italian). Vol. 88: Robusti–Roverella. Rome: Istituto dell'Enciclopedia Italiana. ISBN 978-88-12-00032-6.
- Rendina, Claudio (1994). Enciclopedia di Roma. Rome: Newton Compton.
