= Giacomo Antonelli =

Italian Cardinal Secretary of State

His Eminence Giacomo Antonelli
- Cardinal Secretary of State
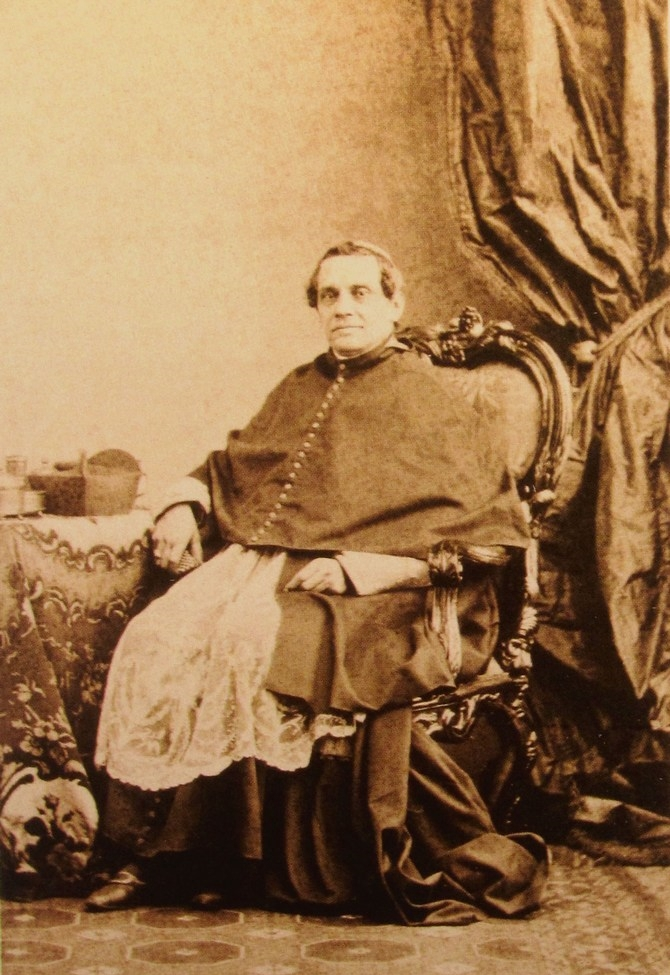
- Photograph taken c. 1867
- See: none
- Appointed: 29 November 1848
- Installed: 29 November 1848
- Term ended: 6 November 1876
- Predecessor: Giovanni Soglia Ceroni
- Successor: Giovanni Simeoni
- Other posts: Cardinal-Deacon of Sant'Agata dei Goti; Cardinal-Deacon of Santa Maria in Via Lata; Cardinal-Protodeacon
- Previous posts: Cardinal Secretary of State (1st time) (10 March – 3 May 1848)

Orders
- Ordination: 1840 (deacon)
- Created cardinal: 11 June 1847 by Pope Pius IX
- Rank: Cardinal-Deacon

Personal details
- Born: Giacomo Antonelli; 2 April 1806
- Died: 6 November 1876 (aged 70)
- Denomination: Catholic

Giacomo Antonelli (2 April 1806 – 6 November 1876) was an Italian Catholic prelate who served as Cardinal Secretary of State for the Holy See from 1848 until his death. He played a key role in Italian politics, resisting the unification of Italy and affecting Catholic interests in European affairs. He was often called the "Italian Richelieu" and the "Red Pope."

== Life ==
He was born at Sonnino near Terracina and was educated for the priesthood, but after taking minor orders, he gave up the idea of becoming a priest and chose an administrative career. Created secular prelate, he was sent as apostolic delegate to Viterbo in 1836, where he early manifested his reactionary tendencies in an attempt to stamp out Liberalism. In 1839 he was transferred to Macerata. In 1840 he was ordained a deacon. Recalled to Rome in 1841 by Pope Gregory XVI, he entered the offices of the Secretariat of State, but four years later was appointed pontifical treasurer-general.

Created cardinal on 11 June 1847, one of the last cardinal deacons in deacon's orders, he was chosen by Pius IX to preside over the council of state entrusted with the drafting of a constitution for the Papal States.

On 10 March 1848, Antonelli became premier of the first constitutional ministry of Pius IX. Upon the collapse of his cabinet when liberals resigned in protest against the papal public refusal to participate in a war of national liberation, 29 April 1848, Antonelli created for himself the governorship of the sacred palaces in order to retain constant access to and influence over the pope.

After the assassination of Pellegrino Rossi (15 November 1848), he arranged the flight of Pius IX to Gaeta on 23 November. That year, the Papal States were overthrown by liberals and replaced by a Roman Republic, only to be restored to the pope in 1849 by force of French and Austrian arms, called in at Antonelli's request.

Notwithstanding promises to the powers upon returning to Rome, on 12 April 1850 Antonelli restored absolute government and disregarded the conditions of the surrender by ordering the wholesale imprisonment of liberals. In 1855, he narrowly escaped assassination. As an ally of Ferdinand II of the Two Sicilies from whom he had received an annual subsidy, he attempted after 1860 to facilitate Ferdinand's restoration by fomenting brigandage on the Neapolitan frontier. To the overtures of Bettino Ricasoli in 1861, Pius IX, at Antonelli's suggestion, replied with the famous "Non possumus" but in 1862 accepted too late Ricasoli's proposal concerning ecclesiastical property.

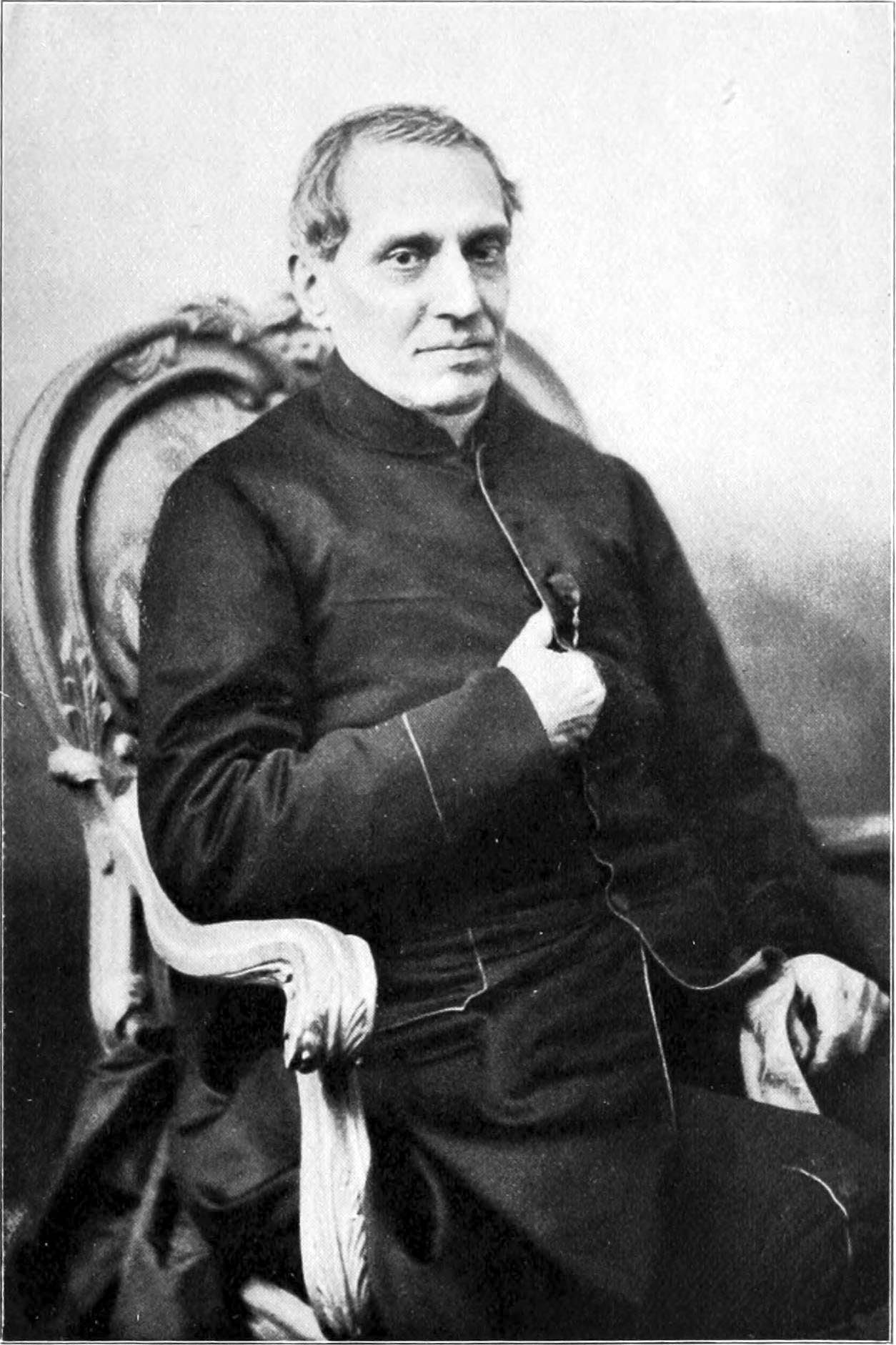
Cardinal Antonelli in the 1870s

After the September Convention of 1864, Antonelli organized the Legion of Antibes to replace French troops in Rome and in 1867 secured French aid against Giuseppe Garibaldi's invasion of papal territory. Upon the reoccupation of Rome by the French after the Battle of Mentana on 3 November 1867, Antonelli again ruled supreme, but after the entry of the Italians in 1870, he was obliged to restrict his activity to the management of foreign relations. With the Pope's approval, he wrote the letter requesting the Italians to occupy the Leonine City in which the Italian government had intended to allow the pope to keep his temporal power and obtained from the Italians payment of the Peter's pence (5,000,000 lire) remaining in the papal exchequer, as well as 50,000 scudi, the only instalment of the Italian allowance (subsequently fixed by the Law of Guarantees, 21 March 1871) that was ever accepted by the Holy See.

By the nature of the post that he occupied from 1850 to his death, Antonelli had little to do with questions of dogma and Church discipline although he signed the circulars addressed to the Powers transmitting the Syllabus of Errors (1864) and the acts of the First Vatican Council (1870).

His activity was devoted almost exclusively to the struggle between the papacy and the Italian Risorgimento. He died on 6 November 1876.

Antonelli bequeathed his personal fortune of about 623,341 gold francs (derived chiefly from his family patrimony) to his four living brothers and two nephews, though pointedly excluding a nephew who had become an anticlerical Italian nationalist, and bequeathed his collection of precious gems to the Vatican museum and the crucifix that he kept on his desk to Pope Pius IX as a personal memento.

Although it did not prevent Pope Pius IX's beatification, some observers believe that Antonelli's notoriety might be enough to prevent his canonization. Antonelli was one of the last deacons to be created a cardinal before Pope Benedict XV decreed in 1917 that all cardinals must have been ordained priests.

No cardinal eligible to participate in a papal conclave has gone as long as Antonelli—29 years—without doing so. Roger Etchegaray overtook Antonelli on 26 November 2008 in years of service as a cardinal and ultimately served for 40 years without participating in a conclave, but he was only eligible to do so for about 23 years because of the age limit of 80 years old imposed by Pope Paul VI in 1971. In both Antonelli's and Etchegaray's cases, their nonparticipation in conclaves was not by choice since there was no conclave either of them could attend freely and legally. No conclave was held during Antonelli's cardinalate, and Etchegaray was excluded by his age from participating in the conclaves of 2005 and 2013.

== Honours ==
- 1850: Grand Cross in the Legion of Honour.

== In popular culture ==
Antonelli appears as a character in the film Li chiamarono... briganti! (1999), interpreted by Giorgio Albertazzi. He also appeared in the 2023 Italian historical drama Kidnapped.

== Notes ==
Catholic Church titles
Previous: Juan Francisco Marco y Catalán	Cardinal-Deacon of Sant'Agata dei Goti; 14 June 1847 – 6 November 1876 title held in commendam from 13 March 1868 – 6 November 1876	Succeeded by Frédéric de Falloux du Coudray
Preceded by Giuseppe Ugolini	Cardinal Protodeacon; 19 December 1867 – 6 November 1876	Succeeded by Prospero Caterini
Preceded by Giuseppe Ugolini	Cardinal-Deacon of Santa Maria in Via Lata; 13 March 1868 – 6 November 1876	Succeeded by Prospero Caterini
Political offices
Preceded by Giuseppe Bofondi	Cardinal Secretary of State; 10 March – 3 May 1848	Succeeded by Anton Orioli
Preceded by Giovanni Soglia Ceroni	Cardinal Secretary of State; 29 November 1848 – 6 November 1876	Succeeded by Giovanni Simeoni
