= Castruccio =

Castruccio is a given name. Notable people with the name include:

- Castruccio Castracane degli Antelminelli (1779–1852), Italian Roman Catholic cardinal
- Castruccio Castracani (1281–1328), Italian condottiero and duke of Lucca
