= Carlo Emanuele Muzzarelli =

Italian politician

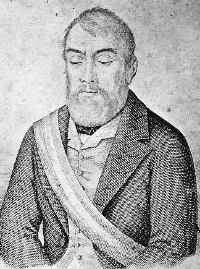
Carlo Emanuele Muzzarelli

Carlo Emanuele dei conti Muzzarelli (19 April 1797 – 1856) was an Italian clergyman, a member of the Roman Catholic curia under Pope Pius IX, who had the reputation of a liberal as well as a man of letters.

== Biography ==
He was born at Ferrara into the Bolognese family of the conti Muzzarelli. He began an honorary quasi-military career in the papal service, as a sub-lieutenant of the pontiff's noble Roman guard. His literary abilities recommended him for places in the Papal curia: he was appointed Auditor of the Rota. Pope Pius IX named him to his High Council, charged with the ministry of Public Instruction, in charge of issuing licenses for publication in the Papal States, and then presiding minister.

Muzzarelli's distinguished career in the curia and as a member of the Accademia dei Lincei at Rome and corresponding member of numerous academies was overtaken by revolutionary events of the Risorgimento. At the time of the uprising that created a Roman Republic following the assassination of Pellegrino Rossi, Muzzarelli was appointed First Minister (16 November 1848), the last in a rapid succession of First Ministers that tumultuous year; when Pius left for Gaeta, 24 November 1848, he left a government in the hands of Muzzarelli, as Presidente del Consiglio dei Ministri. Muzzarelli found himself stigmatised as a "revolutionary" by those clerics and patricians who left Rome to join the Pope in the Kingdom of the Two Sicilies. At the formation of a new government in a new Roman Republic, following an election in which the pope from his exile had proclaimed the act of voting an act of sacrilege, Muzzarelli was requested to retain his position.

When French forces retook Rome in the name of the Pope at the end of that June, Muzzarelli was obliged to withdraw, at first to Tuscany, then to French Corsica, and finally to Genoa, where blindness interrupted his writings in verse as well as prose, and his compilation of biographical notices of literary figures, which he never succeeded in bringing to fruition.
