= Gabriele Ferretti =

Italian Catholic cardinal and Camerlengo of the Sacred College of Cardinals

His Eminence Gabriele Ferretti
- Major Penitentiary of the Apostolic Penitentiary
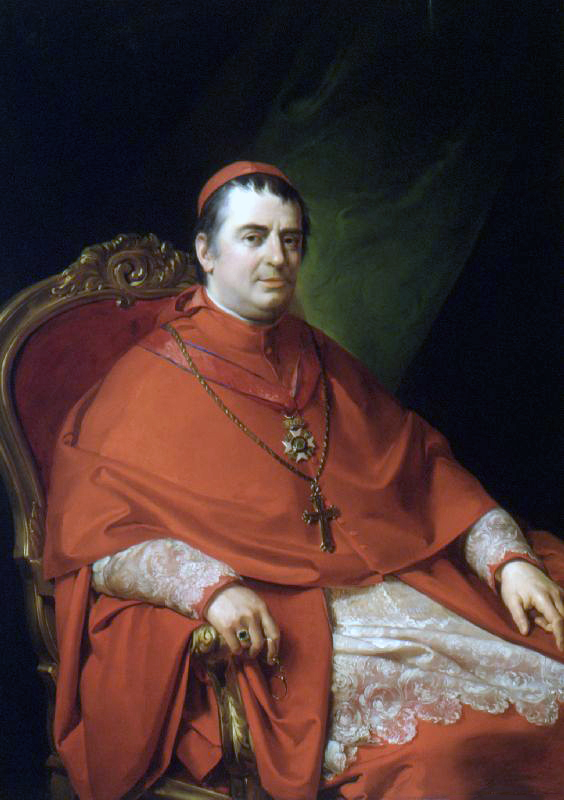
- Portrait by Francesco Podesti
- Church: Roman Catholic Church
- Appointed: 18 March 1852
- Term ended: 13 September 1860
- Predecessor: Castruccio Castracane degli Antelminelli
- Successor: Antonio Maria Cagiano de Azevedo
- Other post: Cardinal-Bishop of Sabina (1853–60)
- Previous posts: Bishop of Rieti (1827–33); Titular Archbishop of Seleucia Trachea (1833–37); Archbishop-Bishop of Montefiascone (1837); Archbishop-Bishop of Corneto (1837); Archbishop of Fermo (1837–42); Cardinal-Priest of Santi Quirico e Giulitta (1839–53); Prefect of the Congregation of Indulgences and Sacred Relics (1843–47); Secretary of State (1847–52); Camerlengo of the College of Cardinals (1854–55)

Orders
- Ordination: 1 June 1817
- Consecration: 27 May 1827 by Carlo Odescalchi
- Created cardinal: 30 November 1838 (in pectore); 8 July 1839 (revealed) by Pope Gregory XVI
- Rank: Cardinal-Priest (1839–53); Cardinal-Bishop (1853–60)

Personal details
- Born: Gabriele Ferretti; 31 January 1795 Ancona, Papal States
- Died: 13 September 1860 (aged 65) Rome, Papal States
- Buried: Santa Maria della Concezione
- Parents: Liverotto Ferretti; Flavia Macinforte Sperelli
- Education: Collegio Romano

Gabriele Ferretti (Italian pronunciation: [ɡabriˈɛːle ferˈretti]; 31 January 1795 in Ancona – 13 September 1860 in Rome) was an Italian Catholic cardinal and Camerlengo of the Sacred College of Cardinals.

== Personal life ==
He was born into nobility, the son of Palatine Count Liverotto Ferretti and Flavia Sperelli. By birth he was Count of Castelferretti, Palatine count and a noble of Rieti and Fermo. He was also a patrician of Ancona and San Marino. He was educated at the Collegio of Parma and the Collegio Tolomei in Siena, before entering the Seminary of Ancona and attending the Collegio Romano, where he earned a doctorate in theology.

== Ecclesiastical service ==
Ferretti was ordained to the priesthood on 1 June 1817.

He was elected bishop of Rieti in 1827. In 1833, he was promoted to the titular see of Seleucia in Isauria and was appointed nuncio in Sicily in the same year. In 1837, he was transferred to the see of Montefiascone e Corneto and later that year was again transferred, this time to the metropolitan see of Fermo.

== Cardinalate ==
Ferretti was elevated to cardinal (in pectore) in November 1838 and was revealed as a cardinal on 8 July 1839.

He resigned pastoral government of his archdiocese in 1842 and was appointed Prefect of the Sacred Consulta of Indulgences and Relics in 1843. Ferretti participated in the Papal Conclave of 1846, which elected Pope Pius IX, and in the same year was appointed legate in the provinces of Urbino and Pesaro.

In the years following, he was appointed to a number of senior positions in the Catholic Church including:

- Vatican Secretary of State - 1847
- Secretary of Memorials - 1847
- Apostolic Penitentiary - 1852 (a position he held until his death)
- Camerlengo of the Sacred College of Cardinals - 1854 to 1855
- Grand prior of the Equestrian Order of St. John of Jerusalem - 1858

== Death ==
Ferretti died on 13 September 1860 in Rome. His funeral was held on 17 September 1860. Pope Pius IX (whom he had helped to elect) participated in his funeral and he was buried, according to his will, in the Capuchin church of the Santissima Concezione in Rome.

== See also ==
- College of Cardinals

Catholic Church titles
Preceded by Giuseppe Maria Velzi	Archbishop of Montefiascone; 19 May – 2 October 1847	Succeeded by Filippo de Angelis
Preceded by Tommaso Pasquale Gizzi	Cardinal Secretary of State; 17 July 1847 – 31 December 1848	Succeeded by Giuseppe Bofondi
Preceded by Castruccio Castracane degli Antelminelli	Apostolic Penitentiary; 18 March 1852 – 13 September 1860	Succeeded by Antonio Maria Cagiano de Azevedo
Preceded by Giacomo Luigi Brignole	Archbishop of Sabina-Poggio Mirteto; 12 September 1853 – 13 September 1860	Succeeded by Girolamo D'Andrea
Preceded by Luigi Amat di San Filippo e Sorso	Camerlengo of the Sacred College of Cardinals; 7 April 1854 – 23 March 1855	Succeeded by Antonio Maria Cagiano de Azevedo
