= Italian Society for Military History =

The Italian Society for Military History (Società Italiana di Storia Militare – SISM) is a scientific society founded by Raimondo Luraghi, in Rome on 14 December 1984. Its aim is promoting studies in the field of military history and organizes meetings, seminars, and other events related to the society's aim. The society periodically issues studies, newsletters, and bulletins. Its primary aim is historical research in collaboration with organisations, societies, and students. It also grants scholarships for university degrees. Other initiatives related to the pursuit of the society's aim can be accomplished or sponsored by proposal by external subjects.

== Partners ==
The SISM is a society acknowledged by the Italian Defense Ministry. It cooperates with the Commissione Italiana di Storia Militare (Italian Committee of Military History – CISM), constituted by a ministerial order on 21 November 1986, with the Centro interuniversitario di studi e ricerche storico-military (Interuniversity Center of Studies and Research in Military History – CIRSM), constituted by an agreement between universities of Turin, Padua and Pisa, and with the Society of Friends of the Italian Military Library, constituted in Varallo Sesia on 20 September 2008. SISM divulged in Italy the Bibliographer Internationale d'histoire militaire (International bibliography of military history) attended by the Bibliography Committee of the Commission international d'histoire militaire (International Commission on Military History – CIHM).

SISM collaborated with CISM in organizing the 18th and 19th International Conference of the Commission Internationale d'Histoire Militaire, which took place in Turin in the years 1992 and 2013.

== Honorary presidents ==
- Prof. Raimondo Luraghi (1992)
- Prof. Mariano Gabriele (2010)

== Presidents ==
- Prof. Raimondo Luraghi (1985–1992)
- Gen. Filippo Stefani (1992–1994)
- Prof. Massimo Mazzetti (1995–1997)
- Prof. Massimo Mazzetti (1995–1997)
- Prof. Antonello Folco Maria Biagini (1997–1999)
- Gen. Pierpaolo Meccariello (1999–2001)
- Prof. Giuseppe Conti (2001–2004)
- Prof. Virgilio Ilari (2004–2007)
- Gen. Pierpaolo Meccariello (February–August 2008)
- Prof. Mariano Gabriele (2008)
- Prof. Virgilio Ilari (2010–present (2023))

== General managers ==
- Michele Nones (1985–1990)
- Giuseppe Conti (1991–1997)
- Piero Crociani (1997)
- Ciro Paoletti (1997–2004)
- Flavio Carbone (2004)
- Nicola Pignato (2004–2008)
- Annamaria Isastia (2009–present (2013))

== Publications ==
=== Books ===
- Teaching of military history in Italy (L’insegnamento delta storia military in Italia')', Acta of seminary held in Rome on 4 December 1987, Roma, Compagnia dei Librai, 1989.
- The Italian Army, history of men and armaments (L’Esercito italiano, storia di uomini e di armi), Roma, Italia, 1988
- Military history of Italy 1796–1975 (Storia militare d’Italia 1796–1975), Roma, Italia, 1990
- Italian in the Russian Campaign of 1812 (Италянски в Россий 1812) Gli italiani nella campagna di Russia del 1812. Acta of the meeting held in Cassino and also Rome in October 2012.

=== In collaboration with CIRSM ===
- Italian military historiography in the last twenty years (La storiografia militare italiana negli ultimi venti anni), edited by Giorgio Rochat and Piero Del Negro, Milano, Angeli, 1985
- Italian bibliography about history and military studies 1960–1984 (Bibliografia italiana di storia e study militari 1960–1984), edited by Giorgio Rochat, Piero Del Negro and Filippo Frassati, Milano, F. Angeli, 1987.
- Handbook on Italian military history (Guida alla storia militare italiana, edited by Piero Del Negro, Edizioni Scientifiche Italiane, Napoli, 1997
- Catalogue of Italian students of military history 2005 (Repertorio degli studiosi italiani di storia militare 2005, edited by Gian Luca Balestra and Nicola Labanca, Milano, Edizioni UNICOPLI, 2005

=== In collaboration with The Ministry of Cultural Heritage and Activities ===
- The fonts for the Italian military history in the Contemporary Age (Le fonti per la storia militare italiana in età contemporanea. Acta of the 3rd seminary Rome 1–17 December 1988), edited by Alberto Maria Arpino, Antonello Folco Maria Biagini and Franco Grispo), Ministry of Cultural Heritage and Activities – Central department for archival resources (Ufficio centrale peri beni archivistici), Roma, 1993.

=== In collaboration with CISM ===
- Acta of the 2nd National meeting on military history (II Convegno nazionale di storia militare) held in Rome at CASD 28–20 October 1999, Italian committee on Military History, Roma, 2001

=== Chaiers ===
Al chaiers are available on line

- 1993, Roma, GEI Gruppo Editoriale Internazionale, 1994. from Scribd
- 1994, Roma, GEI Gruppo Editoriale Internazionale, 1995.
- 1995, Roma, GEI Gruppo Editoriale Internazionale, 1997.
- 1996–1997 National identity of the Armed Forces (Identità nazionale Forze Armate). Acta of the 4th meeting of Sism in Caserta, edited by Fortunato Minniti, Edizioni Scientifiche Italiane, Napoli, 2001.
- 1999 (edited by Fortunato Minniti), Edizioni Scientifiche Italiane, Napoli, 2001.
- 2000 – The military historiography in France and in Italy. Comparison of two experiences (La storiografia militare in Francia e in Italia. Due esperienze a confronto) Acta (edited by Fortunato Minniti), Edizioni Scientifiche Italiane, Napoli, 2001.
- 2001–2002 Italian soldiers in Africa (Militari italiani in Africa) edited by Nicola Labanca, Edizioni Scientifiche Italiane, Napoli, 2004
- 2004–2005 – Tsushima 1905 – Jutland 1916. Acta of naval seminaries of SISM 2005, edited by Marco Gemignani.
- 2006 – History of the future war (Storia della guerra futura). Acta of the 1st meeting SISM at Varallo, edited by Giovanni Cerino Badone.
- 2007–08 History of the economic war (Storia della guerra economica). Acta of the 2nd meeting SISM at Varallo, edited by Catia Eliana Gentilucci.
- 2009 The war of 1859 (La guerra del Cinquantanove) Acta of the National Meeting CISM-SISM about the Second Italian War of Independence
- 2010 The year of Teano (L’Anno di Teano), Acta of the meeting on political-military history of year 1860 held at CASD (Palazzo Salviati) in November 2009
- 2011 The Saint Mark weapons (Le Armi di San Marco) Acta of the meeting on the military history of the Serenissima held at Venice and Padua, September 2011
- 2012-2013 American Legacy. SISM commemorates Raimondo Luraghi).

.

== Bibliography ==
- (in Italian)Filippo Stefani, Un decennio di attività della Società di Storia Militare, in Quaderno 1994, Gruppo Editoriale Internazionale, Roma, 1995, pp. 159–164 ISBN 88-8011-070-5
