= Papal States =

Italian state from 756 to 1870

State of the Church Stato della Chiesa (Italian) Status Ecclesiasticus (Latin)
- 756–1870; Interregna (1798–1799, 1809–1814 and 1849–1850)
- Top: Flag until 1808 (longest use); Bottom: Flag in use in 1870 (last); Coat of arms (15th–19th cent.) Coat of arms (Sede vacante)
- Anthem: Marcia trionfale (1857–1870) "Triumphal March"
- Map of the Papal States (green) at their greatest extent in 1789, including its exclaves of Benevento and Pontecorvo in southern Italy, and the Comtat Venaissin and Avignon in southern France

- The legations of the Papal States in 1850: Rome, I. Romagna, II. Marche, III. Umbria, IV. Marittima e Campagna
- Capital: Rome; (756–1308; 1376–1870); Avignon (1309–1376)
- Official languages: Latin
- Common languages: Italian; Romagnol; Emilian (Bolognese and Ferrarese); Central Italian languages; Southern Italian languages (Beneventan)
- Religion: Catholicism (state religion)
- Demonym: Papalini
- Government: Feudal theocratic elective absolute monarchy (756–1798; 1800–1809); Unitary theocratic elective absolute monarchy (1814–1847; 1850–1870); Unitary theocratic elective semi-constitutional monarchy (1847–1849)
- Pope
  - 756–757 (first): Stephen II
  - 1846–1870 (last): Pius IX
- Cardinal Secretary of State
  - 1551–1555 (first): Girolamo Dandini
  - 1848–1870 (last): Giacomo Antonelli
- Prime Minister
  - 1847–1848 (first): Gabriele Ferretti
  - 1848–1849 (last): Carlo E. Muzzarelli
- Legislature: Parliament (1848)
- History
  - Donation of Pepin: 756
  - Codification: 781
  - Treaty of Venice (sovereignty reaffirmed): 1177
  - Publication of the Constitutiones Aegidianae: 1357
  - Roman Republic (1798–1799): 15 February 1798
  - Schönbrunn Palace Declarations: 17 May 1809
  - Capture of Rome: 20 September 1870
  - Annexation to the Kingdom of Italy: 9 October 1870
  - Vatican City: 11 February 1929

Area
- Before 1859: 44,000 km^{2} (17,000 sq mi)

Population
  - 1853: 3,124,668
- Currency: Roman scudo (until 1866); Papal lira (1866–1870)
Preceded by
Duchy of Rome
Succeeded by
1440: Republic of Cospaia
1545: Duchy of Parma and Piacenza
1798: Tiberina Republic
1798: Roman Republic
1806: Principality of Pontecorvo
1809: First French Empire
1820: Republic of Benevento
1820: Republic of Pontecorvo
1849: Roman Republic
1870: Kingdom of Italy
- Today part of: France; Italy; Vatican City

The Papal States (/ˈpeɪpəl/ PAY-pəl), (Note: Italian: Stato Pontificio; Latin: Dicio Pontificia) officially the State of the Church, were a conglomeration of territories on the Italian Peninsula under the direct sovereign rule of the pope from 756 to 1870. They were among the major Italian states from the 8th century until the unification of Italy, which took place between 1859 and 1870, culminating in their incorporation into the Kingdom of Italy.

The state was legally established in the 8th century when Pepin the Short, king of the Franks, gave Pope Stephen II, as a temporal sovereign, lands formerly held by Arian Christian Lombards, adding them to lands and other real estate formerly acquired and held by the bishops of Rome as landlords from the time of Constantine onward. This donation came about as part of a process whereby the popes began to turn away from the Byzantine emperors as their foremost temporal guardians for reasons such as increased imperial taxes, disagreement with respect to iconoclasm, and failure of the emperors (or their exarchs in Italy) to protect Rome and the rest of the peninsula from barbarian invasion and pillage.

During the early modern period, the papal territory expanded greatly, and the pope became one of Italy's most important rulers as well as the head of Western Christianity. At their zenith, the Papal States covered most of the modern Italian regions of Lazio (which includes Rome), Marche, Umbria, Romagna, and portions of Emilia. The popes' reign over these lands was an exemplification of their temporal powers as secular rulers, as opposed to their ecclesiastical primacy.

By 1860, much of the Papal States' territory had been conquered by the Kingdom of Sardinia and was incorporated into the Kingdom of Italy in 1861, except Lazio, which remained under the pope's control. In 1870, all of Lazio, including Rome, was annexed by the Italian kingdom, which refrained from occupying the Leonine City militarily. In 1929, the Italian fascist leader Benito Mussolini, the head of the Italian government, ended the "Prisoner in the Vatican" period by negotiating the Lateran Treaty, signed by the two parties. This treaty acknowledged the sovereignty of the Holy See over the Vatican City, a newly created city-state within Rome.

== Name ==
The Papal States were also known as the Papal State; although the plural is usually preferred, the singular is equally correct as the polity was more than a mere personal union. The territories were referred to variously as the State(s) of the Church, the Pontifical States, the Ecclesiastical States, the Patrimony of St Peter or the Roman States (Italian: Stato Pontificio, also Stato della Chiesa, Stati della Chiesa, Stati Pontifici, and Stato Ecclesiastico; Latin: Status Pontificius, also Dicio Pontificia "papal rule"). In English they were also referred to as the Popedom.

== History ==
=== Origins ===
For its first 300 years, within the Roman Empire, the Church was persecuted and unable to hold or transfer property. Early congregations met in rooms set aside for the purpose in the homes of wealthy adherents, and a number of titular churches located on the outskirts of Rome were held as property by individuals, rather than by any corporate body. Nonetheless, the property held nominally or actually by individual members of the Roman churches would usually be treated as a common patrimony handed over successively to the legitimate "heir" of that property, often its senior deacons, who were, in turn, assistants to the local bishop. This common patrimony became quite considerable, including as it did not only include houses etc. in Rome or nearby but also landed estates, such as latifundia, whole or in part, across Italy and beyond.

A law of Constantine the Great, promulgated in 321, allowed the Christian Church to possess property and restored to it any property formerly confiscated; in the larger cities of this empire the property restored would have been quite considerable, the Roman patrimony not least among them. The Lateran Palace was gifted to the patrimony, most probably from Constantine himself.

Other donations followed, primarily in mainland Italy but also in the provinces of the Roman Empire. However, the Roman Church held all of these lands as a private landowner, not as a sovereign entity. Following the fall of the Western Roman Empire, the papacy found itself increasingly placed in a precarious and vulnerable position. As central Roman authority disintegrated throughout the late 5th century, control over the Italian Peninsula repeatedly changed hands, falling under the Arian suzerainty of Odoacer in 473, and in 493, Theodoric, king of the Ostrogoths. The Ostrogothic kings would continue to rule much of Italy until 554. The Roman Church submitted of necessity to their sovereign authority, while asserting its spiritual primacy over the whole of Christendom.

Beginning in 535, the Byzantine Emperor Justinian I launched a series of campaigns to wrest Italy from the Ostrogoths which continued until 554 and devastated Italy's political and economic structures. The Byzantines established the Exarchate of Ravenna of which the Duchy of Rome, an area roughly coterminous with modern day Lazio, was an administrative division. In 568 the Lombards entered the peninsula from the north, establishing their own Italian kingdom, and over the next two centuries would conquer most of the Italian territory recently regained by Byzantium. By the 7th century, Byzantine authority was largely limited to a diagonal band running roughly from Ravenna, where the emperor's governor, or exarch, was located, to Rome and south to Naples, plus coastal exclaves. North of Naples, the band of Byzantine control contracted, and the borders of the Rome-Ravenna corridor became extremely narrow.

With effective Byzantine power weighted at the northeast end of this territory, the pope, as the largest landowner and most prestigious figure in Italy, began by default to take on much of the ruling authority that the Byzantines were unable to exercise in the areas surrounding the city of Rome. While the popes legally remained "Roman subjects" under Byzantine authority, in practice the Duchy of Rome became an independent state.

Popular support for the popes in Italy enabled several to defy the will of the Byzantine emperor: Pope Gregory II excommunicated Emperor Leo III during the Iconoclastic Controversy. Nevertheless, the Pope and the exarch still worked together to limit the rising power of the Lombards in Italy. As Byzantine power weakened, though, the papacy assumed an ever-larger role in protecting Rome from the Lombards, but lacking direct control over sizable military assets, the pope relied mainly on diplomacy to achieve as much. In practice, these papal efforts served to focus Lombard aggrandizement on the exarch and Ravenna. A climactic moment in the founding of the Papal States was the agreement over boundaries contained in the Lombardic King Liutprand's Donation of Sutri (728) to Pope Gregory II.

=== Donation of Pepin ===
When the Exarchate of Ravenna finally fell to the Lombards in 751, the Duchy of Rome was completely cut off from the Byzantine Empire, of which it was theoretically still a part. The popes renewed earlier attempts to secure the support of the Franks. In 751, Pope Zachary had Pepin the Short crowned king in place of the powerless Merovingian figurehead King Childeric III. Zachary's successor, Pope Stephen II, later granted Pepin the title Patrician of the Romans. Pepin led a Frankish army into Italy in 754 and 756, defeated the Lombards, thus taking control of northern Italy, and made a gift of the lands formerly constituting the Exarchate of Ravenna to the pope.

Some later claimed that in 781, Charlemagne extended the regions over which the pope would be temporal sovereign: the Duchy of Rome, Ravenna, the Duchy of the Pentapolis, parts of the Duchy of Benevento, Tuscany, Corsica, Lombardy, and a number of Italian cities. The cooperation between the papacy and the Carolingian dynasty climaxed in 800 when Pope Leo III crowned Charlemagne 'Emperor of the Romans'.

=== Relationship with the Holy Roman Empire ===
From the 9th century to the 12th century, the precise nature of the relationship between the popes and emperors – and between the Papal States and the Empire – was disputed. It was unclear whether the Papal States were a separate realm with the Pope as their sovereign ruler, or a part of the Frankish Empire over which the popes had administrative control, as suggested in the late-9th-century treatise Libellus de imperatoria potestate in urbe Roma, or whether the Holy Roman emperors were vicars of the Pope ruling Christendom, with the Pope directly responsible only for the environs of Rome and spiritual duties.

The Holy Roman Empire in its Frankish form collapsed when it was subdivided among Charlemagne's grandchildren. Imperial power in Italy waned and the papacy's prestige declined. This led to a rise in the power of the local Roman nobility, and the control of the Papal States during the early 10th century passed to a powerful and corrupt aristocratic family, the Theophylacti. This period was later dubbed the Saeculum obscurum ("dark age"), and sometimes as the "rule by harlots".

In practice, the popes were unable to exercise effective sovereignty over the extensive and mountainous territories of the Papal States, and the region preserved its old system of government, with many small countships and marquisates, each centred upon a fortified rocca.

Over several campaigns in the mid-10th century, the German ruler Otto I conquered northern Italy; Pope John XII crowned him emperor (the first so crowned in more than forty years) and the two of them ratified the Diploma Ottonianum, by which the emperor became the guarantor of the independence of the Papal States. Yet over the next two centuries, popes and emperors squabbled over a variety of issues, and the German rulers routinely treated the Papal States as part of their realms on those occasions when they projected power into Northern and Central Italy. As the Gregorian Reform worked to free the administration of the church from imperial interference, the independence of the Papal States increased in importance. After the extinction of the Hohenstaufen dynasty, the German emperors rarely interfered in Italian affairs. In response to the struggle between the Guelphs and Ghibellines, the Treaty of Venice was signed in 1177. In the treaty, the rights of the Crown in Rome and in the Patrimony of Saint Peter were left vague, while papal rights of possession, including the Prefecture of the City of Rome, were recognized but "saving all the rights of the empire". By 1300, the Papal States, along with the rest of the Italian principalities, were effectively independent.

=== Avignon Papacy ===
From 1305 to 1378, the popes lived in the papal enclave of Avignon, surrounded by Provence and under the influence of the French kings. This period was known as the "Avignonese" or "Babylonian Captivity". During this period the city of Avignon itself and the surrounding Comtat Venaissin was added to the Papal States; it remained a papal possession for some 400 years even after the popes returned to Rome, until it was seized and incorporated into the French state during the French Revolution.

During the Avignon Papacy, local despots took advantage of the absence of the popes to establish themselves in nominally papal cities: the Pepoli in Bologna, the Ordelaffi in Forlì, the Manfredi in Faenza, and the Malatesta in Rimini all gave nominal acknowledgment to their papal overlords and were declared vicars of the Church.

In Ferrara, the death of Azzo VIII d'Este without legitimate heirs (1308) encouraged Pope Clement V to bring Ferrara under his direct rule: however, it was governed by his appointed vicar, King Robert of Naples, for only nine years before the citizens recalled the Este from exile (1317). Interdiction and excommunications were in vain because in 1332, John XXII was obliged to name three Este brothers as his vicars in Ferrara.

In Rome itself, the Orsini and the Colonna struggled for supremacy, dividing the city's rioni between them. The resulting aristocratic anarchy in the city provided the setting for the fantastic dreams of universal democracy of Cola di Rienzo, who was acclaimed Tribune of the People in 1347, and met a violent death in early October 1354 as he was assassinated by supporters of the Colonna family. To many, rather than an ancient Roman tribune reborn, he had become just another tyrant using the rhetoric of Roman renewal and rebirth to mask his grab for power. As Guido Ruggiero states, "even with the support of Petrarch, his return to first times and the rebirth of ancient Rome was one that would not prevail."

The Rienzo episode engendered renewed attempts from the absentee papacy to re-establish order in the dissolving Papal States, resulting in the military progress of Cardinal Gil Álvarez Carrillo de Albornoz, who was appointed papal legate, and his condottieri heading a small mercenary army. Having received the support of the archbishop of Milan, Giovanni Visconti, he defeated Giovanni di Vico, lord of Viterbo, moving against Galeotto Malatesta of Rimini and the Ordelaffi of Forlì, the Montefeltro of Urbino and the da Polenta of Ravenna, and against the cities of Senigallia and Ancona. The last holdouts against full Papal control were Giovanni Manfredi of Faenza and Francesco II Ordelaffi of Forlì. Albornoz, at the point of being recalled, in a meeting with all the Papal vicars on 29 April 1357, promulgated the Constitutiones Sanctæ Matris Ecclesiæ, which replaced the mosaic of local law and accumulated traditional 'liberties' with a uniform code of civil law. These Constitutiones Aegidianae (as they are informally known) mark a watershed in the legal history of the Papal States; they remained in effect until 1816. Pope Urban V ventured a return to Italy in 1367 that proved premature; he returned to Avignon in 1370 just before his death.

=== Renaissance ===
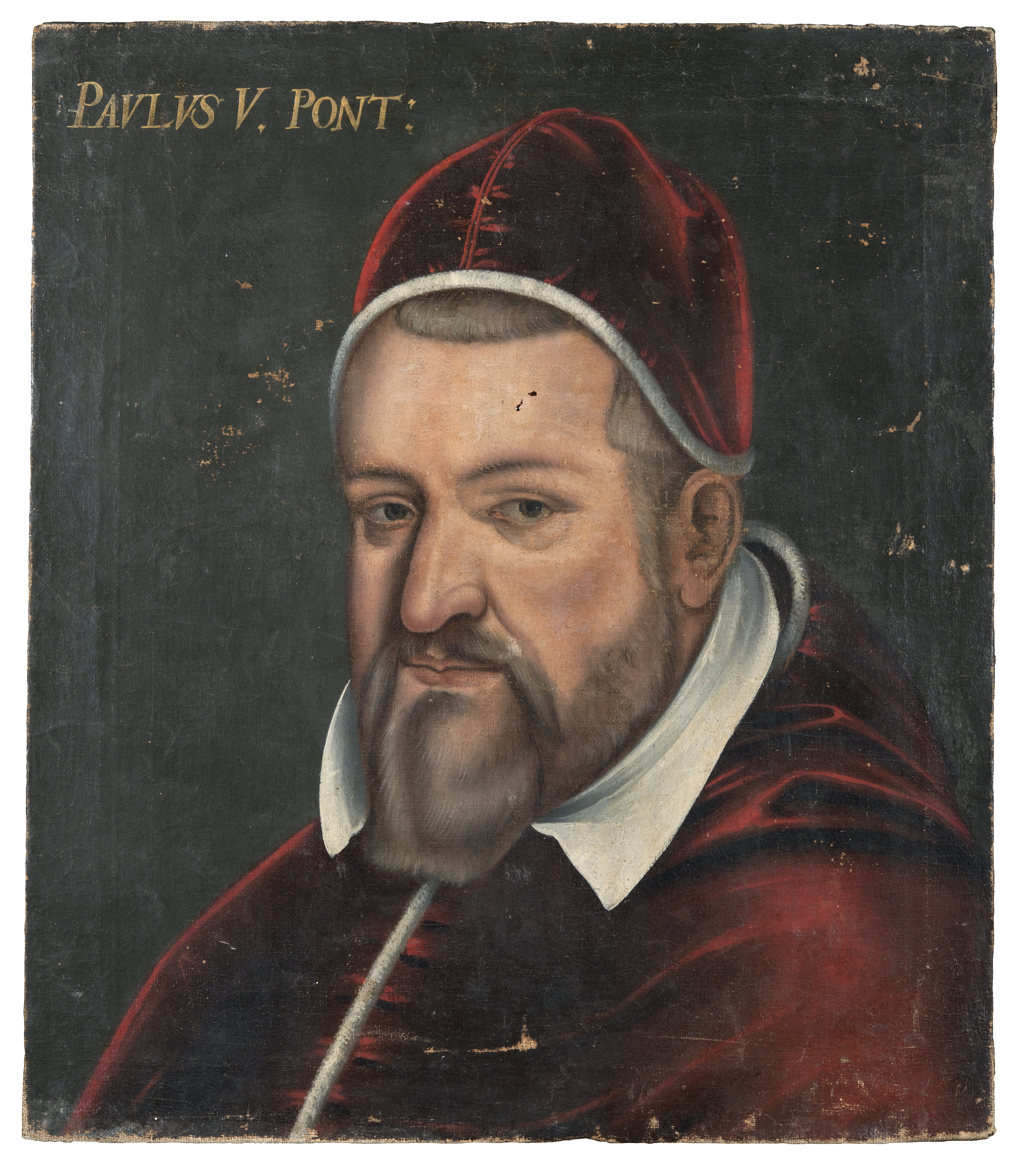
Pope Paul V commissioned the Quirinal Palace.

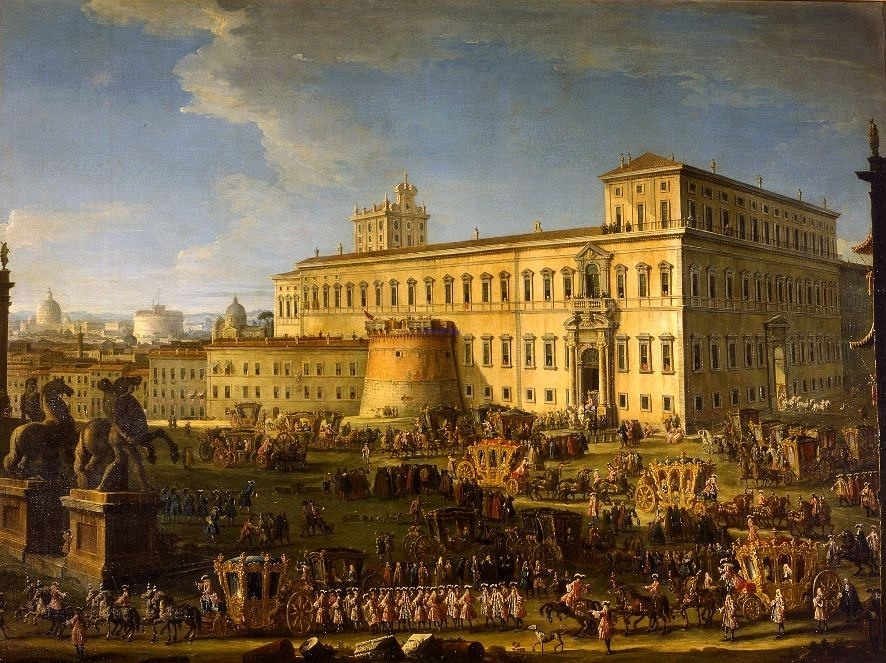
The Quirinal Palace, 1777

During the Renaissance, the Papal territory expanded greatly, notably under Popes Alexander VI and Julius II. As well as already being the head of the Church, the Pope became one of Italy's most important secular rulers, signing treaties with other sovereigns and fighting wars. In practice, though, most of the Papal States were still only nominally controlled by the Pope, and much of the territory was ruled by minor princes. Control was always contested; indeed it took until the 16th century for the Pope to have any genuine control over all his territories.

Papal responsibilities were often in conflict. The Papal States were involved in at least three wars in the first two decades of the 16th century. Julius II, the "Warrior Pope", fought on their behalf.

=== Reformation ===
The Reformation began in 1517. In 1527, before the Holy Roman Empire fought the Protestants, troops loyal to Emperor Charles V brutally sacked Rome and imprisoned Pope Clement VII, as a side effect of battles over the Papal States. Thus Clement VII was forced to give up Parma, Modena, and several smaller territories. A generation later the armies of King Philip II of Spain defeated those of Pope Paul IV in the Italian War of 1551–1559, fought to prevent growing Spanish dominance in Italy.

This period saw a gradual revival of the pope's temporal power in the Papal States. Throughout the 16th century, virtually independent fiefs such as Rimini (a possession of the Malatesta family) were brought back under Papal control. In 1512 the state of the church annexed Parma and Piacenza, which in 1545 became an independent duchy under an illegitimate son of Pope Paul III, albeit as a Papal fief. This process culminated in the reclaiming of the Duchy of Ferrara in 1598, and the Duchy of Urbino in 1631.

Although the Papal States underwent significant administrative centralisation, in practice their government rested on two pillars: a clerical core at the centre and a network of urban patriciates in the provincial towns, especially in regions such as the March of Ancona, where this civic nobility formed a kind of diarchic arrangement between the Roman curia and the local urban patriciates.

In 1649, after the annexation of the Duchy of Castro, the Papal States reached their greatest extent, including most of central Italy – Latium, Umbria, Marche, and the legations of Ravenna, Ferrara, and Bologna extending north into the Romagna. It also included the small enclaves of Benevento and Pontecorvo in southern Italy and the larger Comtat Venaissin around Avignon in southern France.

=== The Roman Republic and the Napoleonic era ===
This position was maintained until 1791, when the French Revolution affected the temporal territories of the Papacy as well as the Roman Church in general. In 1791 a referendum in Comtat Venaissin and Avignon was followed by occupation by Revolutionary France. Later, with the French invasion of Italy in 1796, the Legations (the Papal States' northern territories) were seized and became part of the Cispadane Republic.

Two years later, French forces invaded the remaining area of the Papal States, and in February 1798 General Louis-Alexandre Berthier declared a Roman Republic. Pope Pius VI fled from Rome to Siena and died in exile in Valence in 1799.

In October 1799, Neapolitan troops under King Ferdinand invaded the newfound republic and restored Papal States, ending the republic. The French quickly drove the Neapolitans out and reoccupied the Papal States, but didn't bother restoring the republic, as they continued their invasion to Naples, where they established another republic. In June 1800, French Consulate formally concluded the occupation and restored the Papal States, with the newly elected Pope Pius VII taking residence in Rome. Yet, in 1808 the French Empire under Napoleon invaded again. Then on 2 April 1808, Napoleon decreed that the Papal territories of Urbino, Ancona, Macerata, and Camerino (essentially the region known as the Marches) were to be annexed to the Napoleonic Kingdom of Italy. Approximately 13 months later on 17 May 1809, the remainder of the Papal States (including Rome) was annexed to the First French Empire, forming the départements of Tibre and Trasimène.

Following the fall of the First French Empire in 1814, the Congress of Vienna (1814–15) formally restored the Italian territories of the Papal States, but not the Comtat Venaissin or Avignon, to Vatican control.

=== Italian unification ===
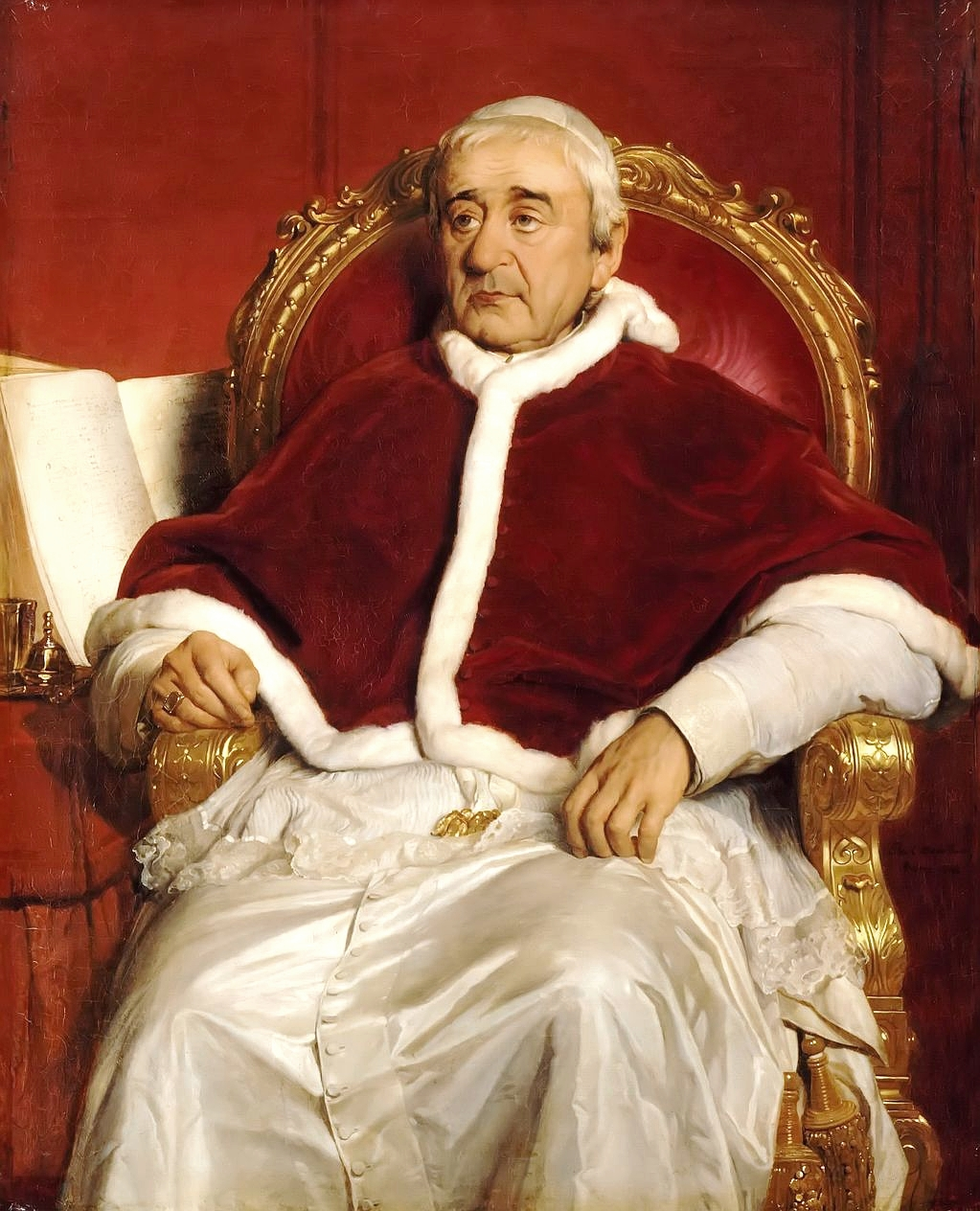
Pope Gregory XVI.

Italian nationalism had been stoked during the Napoleonic period but dashed by the settlement of the Congress of Vienna, which sought to restore the pre-Napoleonic conditions: most of northern Italy was under the rule of junior branches of the Habsburgs and the Bourbons. The Papal States in central Italy was restored. Upon restitution of sovereignty to the Papal States, Pius VII decided to abolish feudalism, transforming all the noble titles (temporarily abolished during the Napoleonic occupation) into honorifics disconnected from territorial privileges. From 1814 until the death of Pope Gregory XVI in 1846, the popes followed a reactionary policy in the Papal States: for example, the city of Rome maintained the last Jewish ghetto in Western Europe.

Popular opposition to the reconstituted and corrupt clerical government led to revolts in 1830 and in 1848, which were suppressed by the intervention of the Austrian army.

The nationalist and liberal revolutions of 1848 affected much of Europe. In February 1849 a Roman Republic was declared, and the hitherto liberally-inclined Pope Pius IX had to flee the city. The revolution was suppressed with French help in 1849 and Pius IX switched to a conservative line of government. Until his return to Rome in 1850, the Papal States were governed by a group of cardinals known as the Red Triumvirate.

As a result of the Second Italian War of Independence (1859), Piedmont-Sardinia annexed Lombardy, while Giuseppe Garibaldi overthrew the Bourbon monarchy in the south. Afraid that Garibaldi would set up a republican government, the Piedmontese government petitioned French Emperor Napoleon III for permission to send troops through the Papal States to gain control of the south. This was granted on the condition that Rome be left undisturbed.

In 1860, with much of the region already in rebellion against Papal rule, Piedmont-Sardinia invaded and conquered the eastern two-thirds of the Papal States, cementing its hold on the south. Bologna, Ferrara, Umbria, the Marches, Benevento and Pontecorvo were all formally annexed by November of the same year. While considerably reduced, the Papal States nevertheless still covered the Latium and large areas northwest of Rome.

A unified Kingdom of Italy was declared and in March 1861 the first Italian parliament, which met in Turin, the old capital of Piedmont, declared Rome the capital of the new kingdom. However, the Italian government could not take possession of the city because a French garrison in Rome protected Pope Pius IX.

=== Italian invasion of Rome, 1870 ===
The Kingdom of Italy and the Papal States in 1870

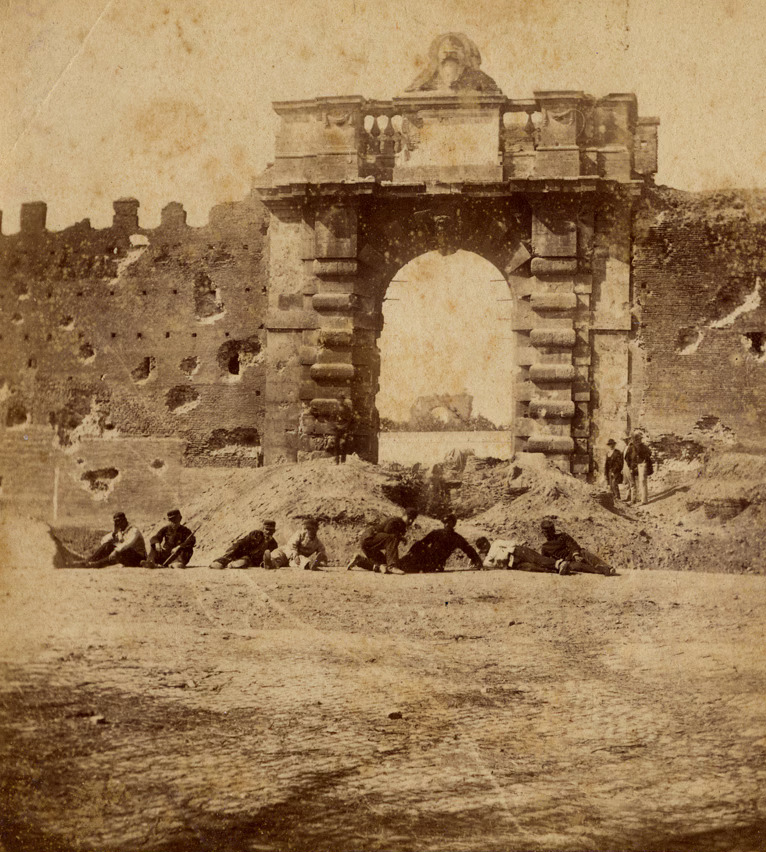
Barricades at Porta San Giovanni, photographed on 21 September 1870, after the breach of the Aurelian Walls

The opportunity for the Kingdom of Italy to eliminate the Papal States came in 1870; the outbreak of the Franco-Prussian War in July prompted Napoleon III to recall his garrison from Rome and the collapse of the Second French Empire at the Battle of Sedan deprived Rome of its French protector.

King Victor Emmanuel II at first aimed at a peaceful conquest of the city and proposed sending troops into Rome, under the guise of offering protection to the Pope. When the Pope refused, Italy declared war on 10 September 1870, and the Royal Italian Army, commanded by General Raffaele Cadorna, crossed the frontier of the Papal territory on September 11 and advanced slowly toward Rome.

The Italian Army reached the Aurelian Walls on September 19 and placed Rome under a state of siege. Although the Pope's tiny army was incapable of defending the city, Pius IX ordered it to put up more than token resistance to emphasize that Italy was acquiring Rome by force and not consent. This incidentally served the purposes of the Italian State and gave rise to the myth of the Breach of Porta Pia, in reality, a tame affair involving a cannonade at close range that demolished a 1600-year-old wall in poor repair. The defence of Rome was not however bloodless, with 12 dead and 47 wounded amongst the Papal forces and 32 dead plus 145 wounded of the Italian troops.

Pope Pius IX ordered the commander of the Papal forces to limit the defence of the city in order to avoid bloodshed. The city was captured on 20 September 1870. Rome and what was left of the Papal States were annexed to the Kingdom of Italy as a result of a plebiscite the following October. This marked the definitive end of the Papal States.

Despite the fact that the traditionally Catholic powers did not come to the Pope's aid, the papacy rejected the 1871 "Law of Guarantees" and any substantial accommodation with the Italian kingdom, especially any proposal which required the Pope to become an Italian subject. Instead, the papacy confined itself (see Prisoner in the Vatican) to the Apostolic Palace and adjacent buildings in the loop of the ancient fortifications known as the Leonine City, on Vatican Hill. From there it maintained a number of features pertaining to sovereignty, such as diplomatic relations since in canon law these were inherent in the papacy.

In the 1920s, the papacy – then ruled by Pius XI – renounced the bulk of the Papal States. The Lateran Treaty with Italy (then ruled by the National Fascist Party under Benito Mussolini) was signed on 11 February 1929, creating the State of the Vatican City, forming the sovereign territory of the Holy See, which was also indemnified to some degree for loss of territory.

== Geography ==
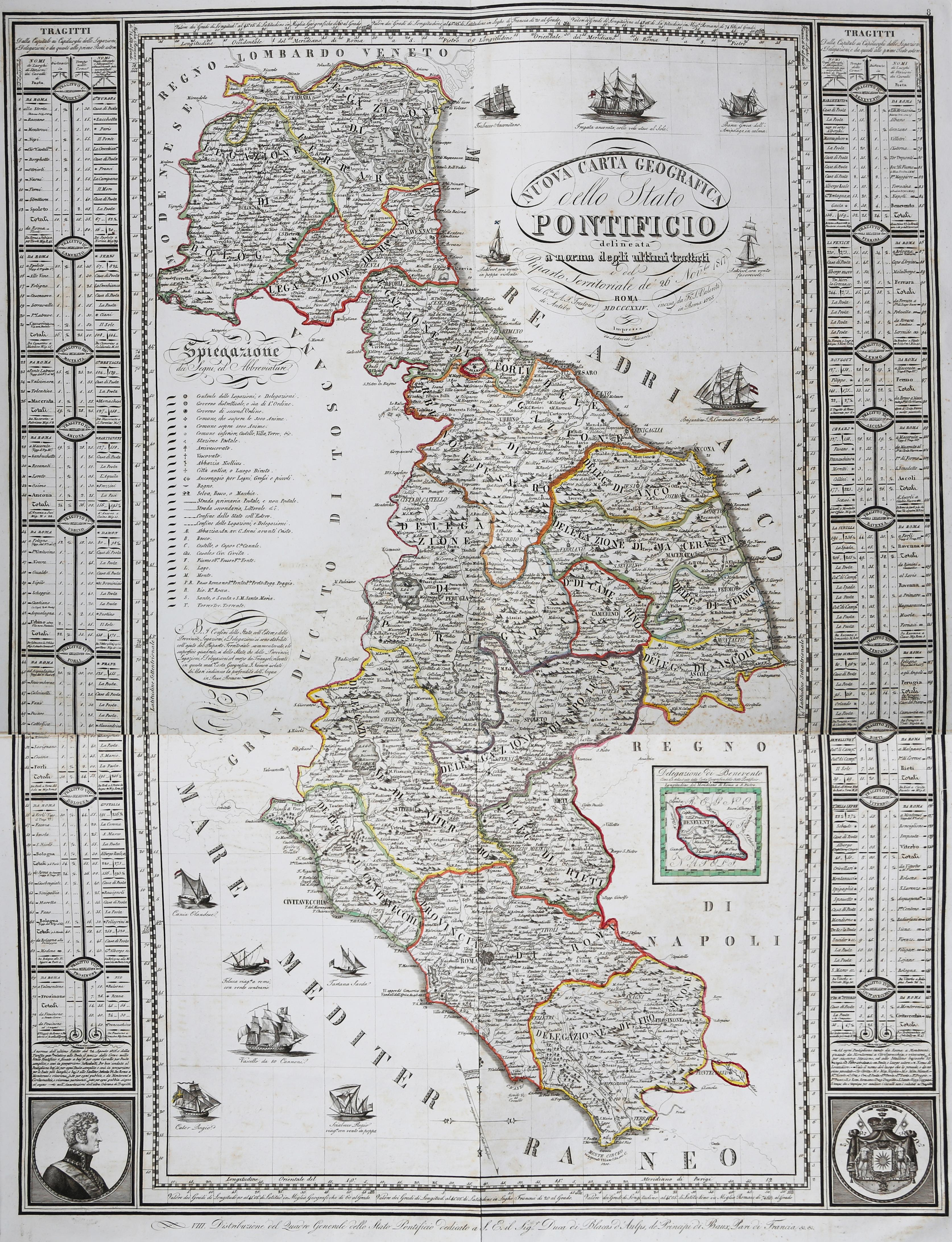
1824 map of the Papal States

The Papal States occupied a central position in the Italian Peninsula, extending roughly between 41°13′N and 45°N latitude. To the north, the territory reached the Po River from Bondeno to its mouths on the Adriatic Sea. To the east, it bordered the Adriatic coast from the area of Mesola southward to the mouth of the Tronto. The southern boundary followed the Abruzzo mountains of the Kingdom of the Two Sicilies, while to the west the frontier ran along the Tyrrhenian coast from the Mount Circeo to Monte Argentario and then northward along the borders with Tuscany and Modena.

The Apennine Mountains crossed much of the territory. The northern Apennines, from the source of the Reno to that of the Tiber, formed a natural division between Tuscan lands and the northern Papal domains. The central Apennines ran from Montecoronaro to Monte Velino, with important passes such as those of Furlo and Colfiorito. Secondary ranges and spurs extended toward the Adriatic, including Monte Conero near Ancona, and toward the Tyrrhenian through the sub-Apennine systems of Tuscany and Rome. Apart from the Umbrian Valley and the coastal plains, much of the territory was mountainous or hilly.

The principal river of the Papal States was the Tiber, which flowed westward to the Tyrrhenian Sea and formed the main fluvial axis of the territory. Among its most important tributaries were the Nera and the Aniene. On the Adriatic side, the most significant rivers included the Reno in the north and the Tronto in the south, together with major central Adriatic streams such as the Metauro and the Esino.

Major lakes included Lake Trasimeno and Lake Bolsena, followed by those of Bracciano and Nemi, and smaller lakes such as Lake Piediluco and Lake Vico. Coastal lagoons were also present between Civitavecchia and Terracina, including those of Fogliano and Paola.

Agricultural conditions varied across the territory. While parts of the Roman Campagna and the Tyrrhenian littoral were affected by under-cultivation and unhealthy marshes, other regions (such as Umbria, the Marches, Romagna, and the Bolognese area) were described as fertile and well cultivated.

== Administrative divisions ==
As the plural name Papal States indicates, the various regional components retained their identity under papal rule. The Pope was represented in each province by a governor, who bore one of a number of titles. These included "papal legate", as in the former principality of Benevento, or at Bologna, in Romagna, and the March of Ancona; and "papal delegate", as in the former Duchy of Pontecorvo and in the Campagne and Maritime Province. Other titles like "Papal Vicar", "Vicar General", and also several titles of nobility, such as "count" or even "prince" were used.

=== Middle Ages to 17th century ===
Until the 17th century, the administrative organization of the Papal States was based on the Egidian Constitutions, which divided the territory in 5 traditional provinces or legations:

- Patrimony of Saint Peter in Tuscia, with its seat in Montefiascone, later in Viterbo
- Campagna e Marittima Province, seat in Ferentino (in Frosinone from 1589 onwards)
- Duchy of Spoleto, seat in Spoleto, later in Perugia
- March of Ancona, seat in Macerata (Fermo until the 15th century)
- Romagna Province, seat in Faenza or Cesena, later in Bologna and Ravenna

The provinces were financially self-sufficient; Rome only exercised coordination. The supreme authority of each individual province was the Papal Legate, who operated with full powers in the name of the Pontiff. The legate governed together with the Rector. The territorial physiognomy of the various provinces remained uncertain for a long time. Only under Pope Pius IV (1559–1565) was a certain and specific identification established for each province.

Until 1540 all the northern territories (Romagna) were administered by a single papal legation. The Cardinal Legate, head of the local government, resided in Bologna, the largest city in the region which became de facto capital.

In 1627, a Congregation for Borders was created. This body was responsible for preventing abuses and mediating frequent disputes regarding territorial jurisdiction between the various provinces and, within these, between dioceses or municipalities.

=== 18th century ===
At the beginning of the eighteenth century, Clement XI and his successor, Innocent XIII, acknowledging the changes that had occurred in the previous century, gave further and more decisive impetus to the process of reforming the political and administrative structure of the state, with the creation of new provinces and the reorganization of the various constituencies on a more homogeneous territorial basis. The aim was to achieve more widespread control over the territory and mitigate the harmful effects of the many aristocratic and municipal privileges that impeded the proper functioning of the state.

The new and more detailed provincial division, not yet drawn up in 1701, at the time of the first (partial) census of the 18th century, would find full implementation in the twenty years that followed and would be entirely reflected in the subsequent census (1767–1769). This division was composed of:

- Twelve provinces: Lazio, Patrimony of St. Peter, Campagna and Marittima, Sabina, Duchy of Spoleto, Perugia, March of Ancona, Urbino, Montefeltro, Romagna, Bologna and Ferrara;
- An extra-territorial legation: Avignon;
- A county: Comtat Venaissin;
- Two dependent territories: Benevento and Pontecorvo.

They were further subdivided into:

- Legations:
  - of Bologna, Romagna or Ravenna, Ferrara, Urbino and Pesaro, Avignon and the Comtat Venaissin;
  - Patrimony of St. Peter, Campagna and Marittima, Lazio or Campagna Romana;
- Delegations: Fano, Camerino, Iesi;
- Rectorates: Montefeltro and Pennabilli, Sabina;
- Governments: Perugia, Città di Castello, Pontecorvo;
- Titled Countries (governments): Duchy of Spoleto, Duchy of Castro and Ronciglione, Duchy of Bracciano, Duchy of Benevento, March of Ancona, March of Fermo, Prefecture of the Mountain (Norcia);
- Autonomous fiefdoms:
  - Duchy of Salci, to the Benelli Ghislieri princes (1568–1816)
  - County of Castiglione de' Gatti, to the Pepoli (1340–1796)
  - County of Bagni di Porretta, to the Ranuzzi (1474–1797)
  - County of Civitella Ranieri, to the Ranieri (1078–1816)
  - County of Piobbico, to the Brancaleoni (1100–1816)
  - County of Reschio, to the Bichi Ruspoli (1355–1817)

== Government ==
The Papal States were ruled under the Pope's temporal power, comprising thirteen provinces in central and northern Italy. These provinces were administered through a hierarchical system of papal officials.

By the mid-18th century, major provinces were governed chiefly by cardinal legates (legati a latere), while provincial and principal city governments were entrusted to prelates of the Roman Curia. Lesser jurisdictions were administered by legally trained governors, who could be removed or transferred according to administrative need. Certain territories outside Italy, such as Benevento and Avignon, were likewise governed by papal prelates holding gubernatorial or vice-legatine authority.

The Papal States were governed through a centralized curial system of cardinal-led congregations. Executive and judicial business was handled by standing and ad-hoc congregations composed of cardinals, prelates and ministers appointed by the Pope. Each congregation was headed by a cardinal prefect (sometimes the Pope himself), assisted by a prelate secretary who prepared business and submitted decisions for papal approval. Matters requiring expedited or sensitive handling were referred to an Extraordinary Congregation of State, convened at the Pope's discretion with a small number of selected cardinals. Questions normally destined for full consistory were first examined within the Congregation of the Consistory, which investigated, heard contradictions and resolved affairs to avoid protracted debate in consistory.

Civil government was exercised through the Congregazione del buon governo, a papal tribunal entrusted with civil, political and economic authority. Its function was to safeguard the public economy by supervising the financial administration of subject communities and preventing fiscal harm to the state. The congregation directed how communal revenues were managed and reviewed local financial conditions to ensure compliance with papal oversight. It possessed authority to authorize taxation and to intervene in disputes involving municipalities. The congregation was composed of a cardinal prefect, several cardinals, a prelate secretary, and additional prelates (ponenti) and met regularly to conduct its business. Certain territories, notably Bologna, were exempt by papal privilege.

=== Feudal territories ===
Alongside directly administered lands, the Papal States included numerous luoghi baronali held by ecclesiastical institutions and noble families, whose lords exercised local jurisdiction while remaining subject to papal sovereignty. In 1701 these territories contained about 264,000 inhabitants in more than 500 parishes, with a large share controlled by leading aristocratic houses such as the abbot of Subiaco, Barberini, Pamphili, Borghese, and Colonna. After the papal restoration in 1815, feudal jurisdictions were abolished in several provinces and progressively curtailed elsewhere. Reforms in 1816 introduced administrative uniformity and encouraged the gradual renunciation of remaining baronial powers.

== Demographics ==
Historical population
Year	Pop.	±% p.a.
1656	1,801,780	—
1701	1,954,596	+0.18%
1708	1,958,688	+0.03%
1736	1,996,877	+0.07%
1769	2,195,653	+0.29%
1782	2,352,808	+0.53%
1816	2,354,721	+0.00%
1833	2,732,436	+0.88%
1844	2,929,807	+0.64%
1853	3,124,668	+0.72%

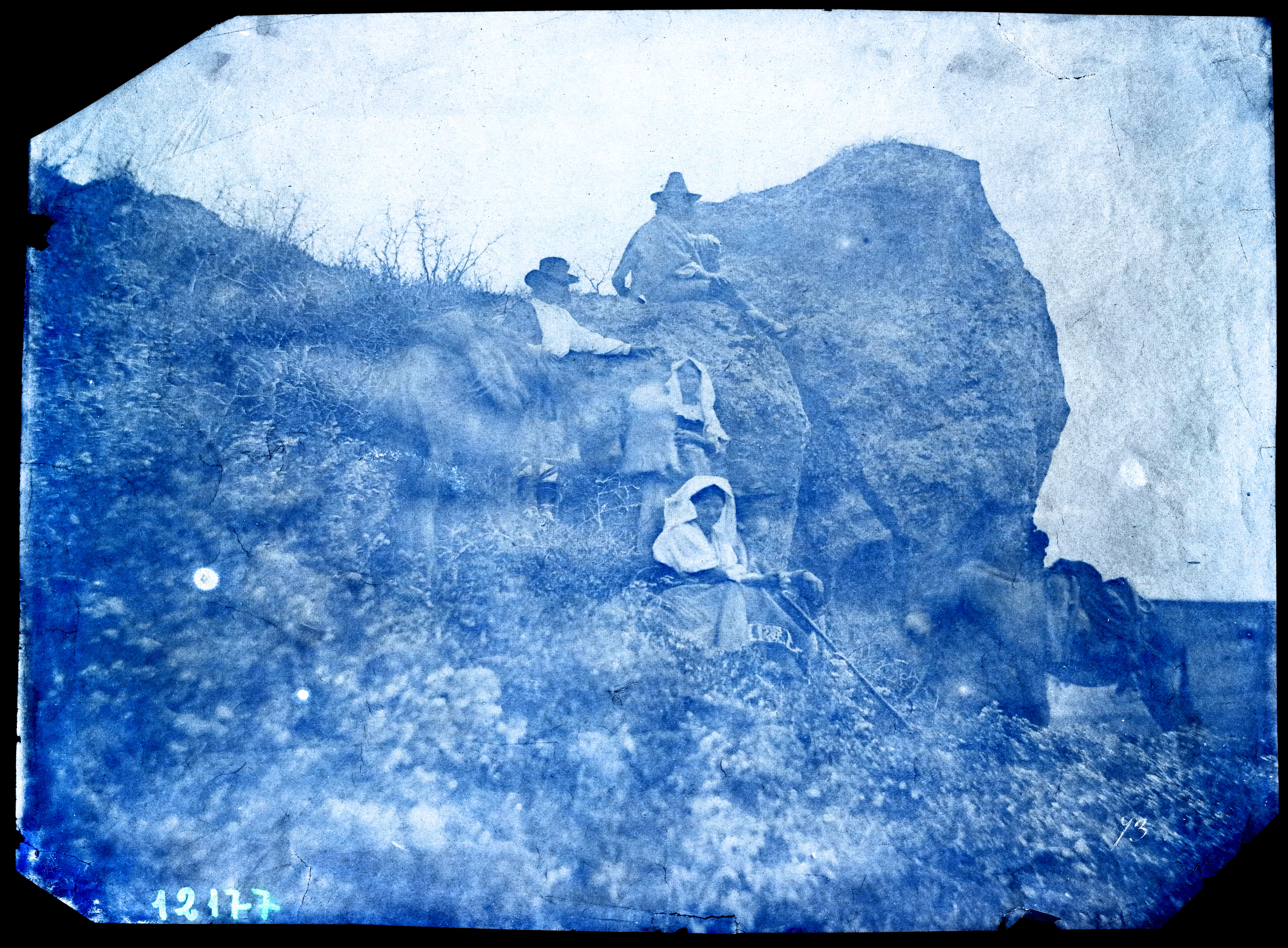
Men and women in traditional dress seated on a rocky outcrop in the Roman countryside, c. 1850–1853

Population counts in the Papal States began relatively late compared to other Italian states. While parts of Italy carried out censuses as early as the 15th century, the Roman State followed this example only in the mid-17th century.

During the 17th century the Papal States experienced marked population decline. Contemporary observers reported significant reductions in several provinces and dioceses, with some areas losing up to a third of their inhabitants within a few decades. By the 1670s it was claimed that in less than 40 years the state had lost about one third of its subjects.

In 1656 the first general census ordered by Pope Alexander VII recorded about 1.8 million inhabitants. The census of 1701 recorded about 1.95 million inhabitants. Population growth between 1656 and 1701 was modest at a few thousand persons per year. A further census in 1708 showed only a slight increase to nearly 1.96 million inhabitants, as grain shortages and epidemics at the beginning of the 18th century slowed demographic expansion.

Between 1708 and 1736 overall population growth remained modest. By 1736 the state had about 2 million inhabitants. Growth was driven mainly by Rome while the provinces increased only slightly. By 1769 the population reached about 2.2 million, and by 1782 about 2.35 million with a marked acceleration after 1769 as the provinces gained more than 150,000 inhabitants in little over a decade.

The population of the Papal States grew steadily during the first half of the 19th century, rising from about 2.36 million inhabitants in 1816 to roughly 2.73 million in 1833, 2.93 million in 1844, and just over 3.13 million by 1853.

=== Religion ===
According to the 1853 census, 99.7% of the population was Catholic. Jews were the largest non-Catholic group, numbering 9,237, and were concentrated mainly in the Comarca of Rome and the provinces of Ancona, Ferrara, and Pesaro e Urbino. All other non-Catholic groups combined accounted for 263 people.

=== Largest cities ===
In the mid-19th century, the largest city in the Papal States was Rome, with about 170,000 inhabitants, far surpassing all others. It was followed at a distance by Bologna, with around 71,000, and Perugia, with about 30,000.

A second tier of sizeable towns included Ancona and Ferrara, each with roughly 24,000 inhabitants, and Benevento with about 18,000. Ravenna also stood among the more populous centers, with around 16,000.

Below these were a number of smaller provincial cities such as Viterbo, Rieti, Macerata, and Ascoli, each with populations of about 12,000 to 13,000, while towns like Orvieto, Loreto, and Civitavecchia ranged between roughly 7,000 and 8,000 inhabitants.

== Economy ==
In the 1850s, the economy of the Papal States was reportedly predominantly agrarian. The principal products included grain, olives, silk, hemp, wool, cheese, and livestock. Contemporary accounts also noted the presence of wool and silk textile workshops, as well as paper mills, imitation pearl manufactures and rope-making establishments.

=== Public finances ===
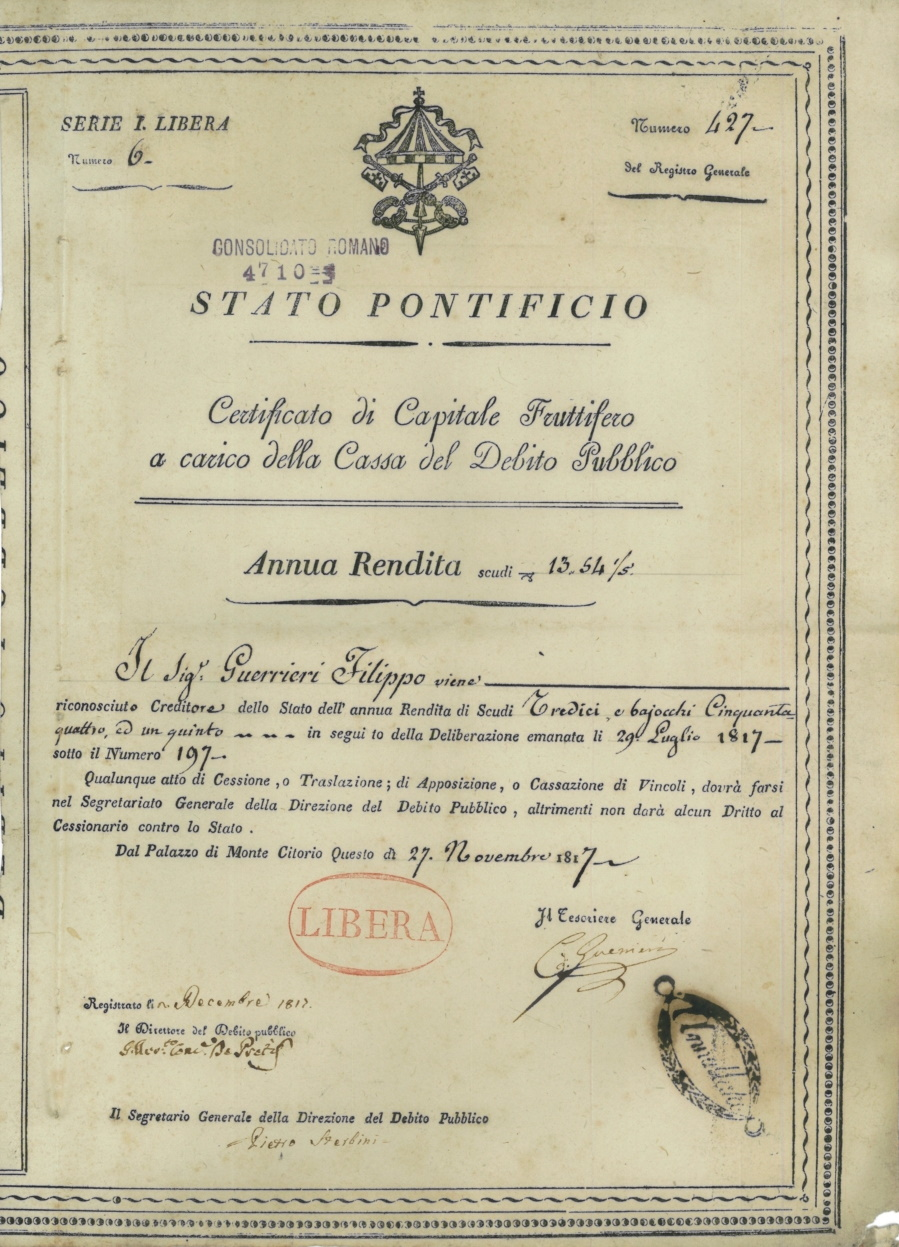
Government bond from 1817, with an interest payment of 13.54 scudi

In the 17th century the Papal States faced chronic financial crisis. Revenues of just over 2 million scudi were largely consumed by debt interest, and public debt rose sharply from about 15 million scudi in the 1620s to around 50 million by the 1670s. Extraordinary levies were also imposed during times of crisis, including a subsidy of about 700,000 scudi during the famine of 1647 to 1648. By 1676 the state carried a public debt that imposed an annual interest burden of about 2.4 million scudi. Heavy fiscal pressures and war expenses contributed to widespread poverty and economic stagnation.

In the 18th century the finances of the Papal States were marked by structural imbalance between ordinary revenue and growing expenditure. In 1729 annual income stood at about 2.7 million scudi against roughly 2.4 million scudi in expenditure, yet tax exemptions and salary increases soon eliminated the surplus and produced a recurring annual deficit of about 120,000 scudi. In 1716 subsidies of 175,000 scudi and later 300,000 scudi were granted to Venice during its war against the Ottoman Empire despite strained resources.

Court expenditure remained high and large public works were financed through borrowing. By 1736 papal spending reached about 15.8 million lire. In 1736 Clement XII invested 200,000 scudi in the port of Ancona after contracting a loan of 600,000 scudi, increasing the burden of interest on the treasury. In 1753 Benedict XIV sold rights over benefices and revenues to Spain for about 6.7 million lire in gold. The famine of 1763–1764 required major grain imports into Rome and exposed economic vulnerability. Despite partial recovery later in the century the treasury remained unbalanced under Pius VI owing to administrative disorder and sustained court expenditure.

The French invasions imposed heavy financial burdens on the Papal States. The armistice of Bologna of 1796 required payment of 21 million lire, of which 5 million were actually paid, and the Treaty of Tolentino of February 1797 imposed a further 30 million lire while ceding Bologna, Ferrara and Ravenna. Public debt rose to 12.3 million scudi, with communal liabilities of 8 million and 3.3 million owed by the Roman annona.

In February 1798 the Roman Republic agreed to pay France 3.6 million scudi. In 1806 the maintenance of Napoleonic troops cost 1.3 million scudi in four months, against annual revenue of about 4 million. By 1811 government debt had reached 74 million scudi, and French authorities liquidated it by suppressing religious corporations and confiscating their property.

In the 19th century the Papal States recorded annual revenues of about 13.5 million florins. The fiscal system relied chiefly on indirect taxation, which produced roughly 10 million florins, while direct taxes accounted for about 2.3 million florins. The overall tax burden averaged close to 5 florins per person. Public debt amounted to approximately 187 million florins, a sum that greatly exceeded the state's yearly income.

=== Currency ===
In the 1850s, the Papal States used the Roman scudo as their principal unit of currency, divided into 10 paoli, each of 10 baiocchi. Gold coins in circulation included the zecchino, worth 2 scudi and 8 baiocchi, and the doppia romana, valued at 3 scudi and 21 baiocchi. There were also gold pieces of 8 scudi and of 2 1/2 scudi.

Silver coinage consisted of the scudo and its half, the testone worth 3 paoli, the papetto worth 2 paoli, the paolo, and the half paolo. The baiocco was the smallest common denomination. Contemporary conversions placed the scudo at roughly 3.37 French francs.

== Transport ==
Early proposals for railway development in the Papal States were made in 1834 by Monsignor Gaspare Grasselini. In a discourse delivered to the provincial council of Ancona, Grasselini proposed a railway connecting the Tyrrhenian and Adriatic Seas, linking the main ports of the state.

In 1856 the Papal government granted private concessions to build railways. A Rome–Civitavecchia railway was authorized with completion set at three years. Another decree approved the Rome to Bologna line via Ancona, divided into three sections: Rome to Foligno, Foligno to Ancona (now the Rome–Ancona railway) and Ancona to Bologna, with priority given to the first section. The Rome–Frascati railway was inaugurated in July 1856, and a Bologna to Ferrara extension was also authorized the same year.

== Military ==
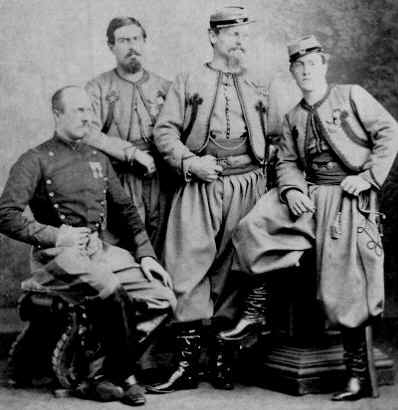
Papal Zouaves pose in 1869.

=== Middle ages to early modern era ===
Historically the Papal States maintained military forces composed of volunteers, mercenaries (including Corsican Guard) and Catholic military orders. It was a notable regional military power from the High Middle Ages to the mid-17th century Wars of Castro.

After 1600 and especially after 1644, the Papal military became a much lower priority for the state and fell into disrepair. There were various reasons for this. Chief among them were the decline of the Ottoman Empire in the east (especially after their defeat at the hands of the Holy Roman Empire in the Great Turkish War) and the rise of Holy Roman/Austrian and Spanish power in Italy after the end of the Italian Wars. The former lessened the need for pan-European expeditionary warfare, while the latter established a much more stable regional order, both disincentivizing investment in the military. Despite ruling a relatively large and rich territory the papacy's military strength was effectively irrelevant in its regional context; threats that could plausibly threaten the local hegemon (or a threat from said hegemon itself) would be one that the papacy would be powerless against no matter what preparations it made. The foreign policy issues of Rome – such as the independence of national churches – were thus resolved via diplomacy and spiritual authority rather than military force. The Papal military from the mid-17th century onward was limited to maintaining order within its own borders. By 1796, the Papal States' military was probably the worst one in Europe, and not expected to see any serious combat.

=== Napoleonic era ===
In 1792 the Papal army had a mere 5,000 regular soldiers for a state that controlled most of Central Italy. In theory this could be augmented by 80,000 reserves and citizen-militia, though nowhere near as many were actually called up at any point. Control over the military was divided among the Commissioner of Arms (most troops), the Treasurer General (the customs guards and garrisons beyond Lazio), the Secretary of the Consulta (a handful of personnel), and the Master of the Apostolic Palace (the palace guard). Each commander jealously guarded his powers, and the army was restricted to performing the duties of ceremonial honor guard, fortress garrison, border patrol, customs police, coastal surveillance, and law enforcement. Beyond actions against corsairs, bandits, and marauders, the most recent military action had been in 1739, when a papal estate in Romagna had utilized 500 men to invade San Marino over a legal dispute. The navy consisted of only three galleys, two coastal corvettes, and a handful of lighter vessels. When Napoleon's Army of Italy launched its first invasion of papal territory in 1796, units in their path surrendered or deserted at the first appearance of the French, and Romagna was ceded to the French Republic without a fight. At the emperor's encouragement, the Papal States revoked the cession and attempted to force the issue with a newly-built army of 10,000 men, thinking the French would be too busy fighting the Imperials to respond. Imperial officer Michelangelo Alessandro Colli-Marchi was also made commander-in-chief of the Papal army in hopes he could restore quality. Instead, the French invaded again in 1797–1798 after defeating the Imperial (Austrian and Piedmontese) armies in the Italian campaign of 1796–1797. The Papal troops, who never expected to actually fight a serious French presence, were quickly routed and the entire territory of the papacy was occupied by the French Republic.

=== After 1815 ===
The Papal States maintained forces after the end of the Napoleonic era. Pope Pius IX refers in a speech to the Consistory of Cardinals gathered in Gaeta, during the time of the short-lived Roman Republic, to a letter he had issued to the Papal troops on 5 January 1849 calling on them to remain his loyal and obedient in their service.

=== Risorgimento ===
Between 1860 and 1870, the Papal Army (Italian: Esercito Pontificio) comprised two regiments of locally recruited Italian infantry, two Swiss regiments and a battalion of Irish volunteers, plus artillery and dragoons. In 1861 an international Catholic volunteer corps, called Papal Zouaves after a kind of French colonial native Algerian infantry, and imitating their uniform type, was created. Made up of Belgian, French, Dutch, and Québécois volunteers, this corps saw service against Garibaldi's Redshirts, Italian patriots, and finally the forces of the newly united Italy. The Captain General of the Church (Italian: Capitano generale della Chiesa) was the de facto commander-in-chief of the Papal States' armed forces. Similarly to 1797, the ossified Papal army provided very little resistance when the Piedmontese-Sardinians invaded various times during the unification of Italy.

The Papal Army was disbanded in 1870, leaving only the Palatine Guard, which was itself disbanded on 14 September 1970 by Pope Paul VI; the Noble Guard, which also disbanded in 1970; and the Swiss Guard, which continues to serve both as a ceremonial unit at the Vatican and as the Pope's protective force.

A small Papal Navy was also maintained, based at Civitavecchia on the west coast and Ancona on the east. With the fall of the Papal States in 1870, the last ships of the flotilla were sailed to France, where they were sold after the death of Pius IX.

== Culture ==
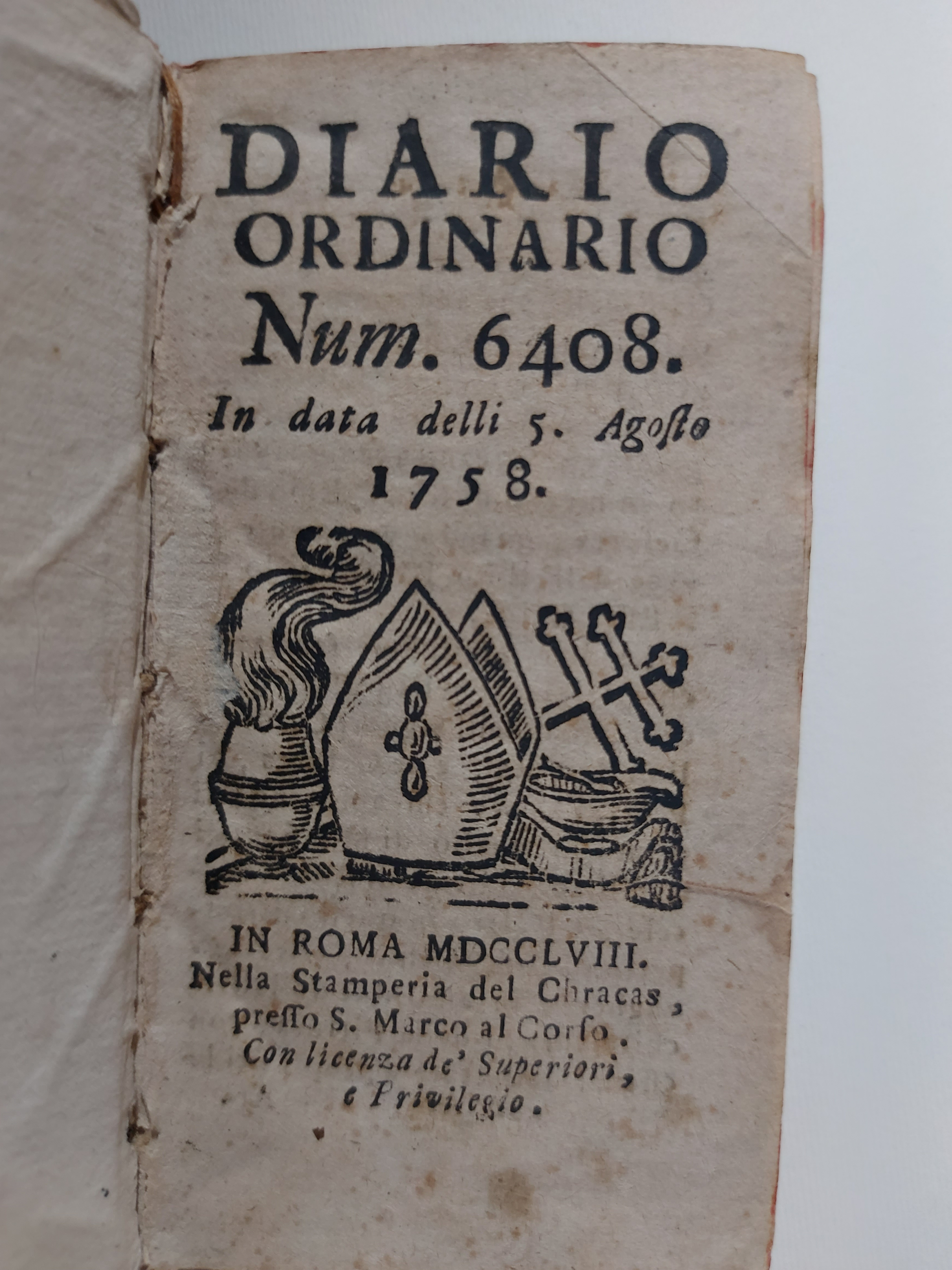
Diario Ordinario printed by Chracas in Rome on 5 August 1758.

In Rome, the first newspaper, Diario Ordinario printed by Chracas, was not published until 1716. It remained the city's sole newspaper until the Jacobin Notizie Politiche appeared in 1788, though this publication lasted only two years. The situation changed drastically with the Napoleonic invasion of Italy in 1796 and the subsequent establishment of the Roman Republic.

== Education ==
Education in the Papal States was fragmented and unevenly distributed until the early 19th century. Before the 1825 Regulation published by the Congregation of Studies there was no common curriculum, and teaching ranged from basic religious instruction to grammar and history according to local initiative. Many schools were run by religious orders or supported by municipalities, while others functioned clandestinely without license.

From the late 16th century onward, a relatively articulated educational system developed, aimed at different social strata. Primary education was provided by a wide range of institutions, including schools run by regular and secular clergy and, to a lesser extent, by private individuals. Religious orders played a central role, viewing education both as a means of religious instruction and as a tool for the social advancement of the lower classes.

In major urban centers, various types of schools were established, including those run by religious orders, parish schools, and other institutions that expanded access to basic education. Schools closer to the modern concept of public education were the so-called regionarie (regionary, or district schools), which were spread across the districts of Rome and placed under institutional supervision.

In Rome, several types of schools became widespread. These included the scuole pie of the Scolopi, founded by Joseph Calasanz; the schools of the Lassallians, known as "degli ignorantelli" because they excluded the study of Latin; and those of the padri dottrinali. Parish schools were also numerous.

For girls, the educational offer was similarly varied. Girls from aristocratic and well-off families could access educandati in monasteries. For lower social classes able to pay, there were female regionary schools run by teachers authorized by the cardinal vicar. In the 17th century, free schools for poor girls were established, including pontifical schools instituted by Alexander VII and those run by the Ursulines founded by Angela Merici. At the end of the 17th century, the scuole pie femminili founded by Rose Venerini and Lucy Filippini spread, aimed at girls of the lower classes and focused on forming good wives and mothers capable of transmitting Christian principles.

In smaller urban centers, education was provided by municipal schools, where teachers were selected and paid by local authorities. The level of instruction in these smaller communities was sometimes limited to reading and only occasionally writing, and some areas lacked schools altogether for long periods.

Educational institutions operated autonomously, with varying curricula depending on social class, and could be either free or fee-paying. In addition to schools, numerous charitable institutions such as hospices and conservatories provided basic education and vocational training for poor or orphaned children.

Teachers generally had limited education and training, often coming from the clergy or from other professions, and formal teacher training institutions did not exist. Teaching required only basic skills and moral qualifications, and the profession was poorly paid and of low social status.

Early education across the country consistently emphasized reading, and to a lesser extent writing. A common teaching method was rote learning using wall charts from which pupils recited letters and syllables aloud. At more advanced stages, elementary arithmetic, often taught with the abacus, and grammar, were introduced.

Textbooks were largely standardized and remained broadly unchanged until the end of the Papal States. From 1727 they were printed at the Ospizio di San Michele, which had been granted a monopoly on schoolbook printing by Pope Benedict XIII, later renewed in 1826 and 1856. These texts, primarily religious and moral in content alongside grammatical works, continued to be used across generations until the end of the Papal States. Among the principal texts were Vita di Giosafat, Leggendario di alcune sante vergini, Le sette trombe per risvegliare il peccatore a penitenza, Centuria di esempi, Ianua grammaticae, Ciceronis orationes selectae, and Emanuel grammatica.

In the mid-19th century, the country had three universities, in Rome, Bologna, and Perugia.

== See also ==
- Captain General of the Church
- Donation of Constantine
- Italian United Provinces
- War of the Eight Saints
- Clash between the Church and the Empire

== Sources ==
- This article incorporates text from a publication now in the public domain: Herbermann, Charles, ed. (1913). "States of the Church". Catholic Encyclopedia. New York: Robert Appleton Company.
- Chambers, D.S. 2006. Popes, Cardinals & War: The Military Church in Renaissance and Early Modern Europe. I.B. Tauris. ISBN 1-84511-178-8. [sic]
- Corridore, Francesco (1906). La popolazione dello Stato romano (1656-1901). Ermanno Loescher.
- De Cesare, Raffaele (1909). The Last Days of Papal Rome. London: Archibald Constable & Co.
- De Grand, Alexander J. (2004). Fascist Italy and Nazi Germany: The "fascist" Style of Rule. Psychology Press. ISBN 978-0415336314. Archived from the original on 13 January 2022.
- Domenico, Roy Palmer (2002). The Regions of Italy: A Reference Guide to History and Culture. Greenwood Publishing Group. ISBN 978-0313307331. Archived from the original on 13 January 2022.
- Elm, Kaspar; Mixson, James D. (2015). Religious Life between Jerusalem, the Desert, and the World: Selected Essays by Kaspar Elm. BRILL. ISBN 978-9004307780. Archived from the original on 13 January 2022.
- Fischer, Conan (2011). Europe between Democracy and Dictatorship: 1900–1945. John Wiley & Sons. ISBN 978-1444351453. Archived from the original on 13 January 2022.
- Gross, Hanns (2004). Rome in the Age of Enlightenment: The Post-Tridentine Syndrome and the Ancien Régime. Cambridge, England: Cambridge University Press. ISBN 978-0521893787. Archived from the original on 13 January 2022.
- Hanlon, Gregory (2008). The Twilight Of A Military Tradition: Italian Aristocrats And European Conflicts, 1560–1800. Routledge. ISBN 978-1135361433. Archived from the original on 13 January 2022.
- Hanson, Paul R. (2015). Historical Dictionary of the French Revolution (2nd ed.). Rowman & Littlefield. p. 252. ISBN 978-0810878921. "Comtat Venaissin and Avignon were annexed by France."
- Italian Committee of Military History (2011). Il Risorgimento e l'Europa [The Risorgimento and Europe]. Rome: Italian Ministry of Defence.
- Kleinhenz, Christopher (2004). Medieval Italy: An Encyclopedia. Routledge. ISBN 978-1135948801. Archived from the original on 13 January 2022.
- Levillain, Philippe (2002). The Papacy: Gaius-Proxies. Psychology Press. ISBN 978-0415922302. Archived from the original on 13 January 2022.
- Luther, Martin (1521). Passional Christi und Antichristi Archived 2020-09-05 at the Wayback Machine. Reprinted in W.H.T. Dau (1921). At the Tribunal of Caesar: Leaves from the Story of Luther's Life. St. Louis: Concordia. (Google Books)
- Menache, Sophia (2003). Clement V. Cambridge, England: Cambridge University Press. p. 142. ISBN 978-0521521987. Archived from the original on 13 January 2022.
- Ministero del commercio e lavori pubblici (1857). Statistica della popolazione dello Stato Pontificio dell'anno 1853 (in Italian). Tipografia della Reverenda Camera Apostolica.
- Roessler, Shirley Elson; Miklos, Reny (2003). Europe 1715–1919: From Enlightenment to World War. Rowman & Littlefield Publishers. ISBN 978-0742568792. Archived from the original on 13 January 2022.
- Ruggiero, Guido (2014). The Renaissance in Italy: A Social and Cultural History of the Rinascimento. Cambridge, England: Cambridge University Press. ISBN 978-1316123270. Archived from the original on 13 January 2022.
- Spielvogel, Jackson J. (2013). Western Civilization: A Brief History (8th ed.). Cengage Learning. ISBN 978-1133606765. Archived from the original on 13 January 2022.
- Treadgold, Warren T. (1997). A History of the Byzantine State and Society. Stanford University Press. ISBN 978-0804726306. Archived from the original on 13 January 2022.
- Tucker, Spencer C. (2009). A Global Chronology of Conflict: From the Ancient World to the Modern Middle East [6 volumes]. ABC-CLIO. ISBN 978-1851096725. Archived from the original on 13 January 2022.
- Waley, Daniel Philip (1966). Rearder, Harry (ed.). A Short History of Italy: From Classical Times to Present Day. University Press. "1332 John XXII vicars."
- Watanabe, Morimichi (2013). Izbicki, Thomas M.; Christianson, Gerald (eds.). Nicholas of Cusa – A Companion to his Life and his Times. Ashgate Publishing. ISBN 978-1409482-536. Archived from the original on 13 January 2022.
