= Achille Apolloni =

His Eminence Achille Apolloni
- Cardinal-Deacon of San Cesareo in Palatio
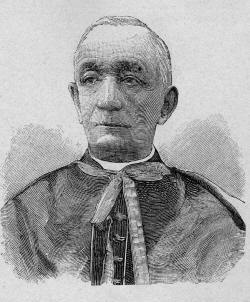
- Church: Roman Catholic Church
- Appointed: 27 May 1889
- Term ended: 3 April 1893
- Predecessor: Ignazio Masotti
- Successor: Giuseppe Antonio Ermenegildo Prisco
- Previous post: Vice-Camerlengo of the Apostolic Camera (1884-92)

Orders
- Ordination: 20 March 1850
- Created cardinal: 24 May 1889 by Pope Leo XIII
- Rank: Cardinal-Deacon

Personal details
- Born: Achille Apolloni; 13 May 1823 Anagni, Papal States
- Died: 3 April 1893 (aged 69) Rome, Kingdom of Italy
- Buried: Campo Verano
- Parents: Vincenzo Apolloni; Luisa Giannuzzi
- Education: Roman College; Pontifical Academy of Ecclesiastical Nobles

Achille Apolloni (13 May 1823 – 3 April 1893) was an Italian prelate of the Catholic Church who enjoyed the career of someone from a distinguished family, working in the Roman Curia or the personal service of the pope, and promoted automatically without regard for personal merit. He was made a cardinal in 1890.

== Biography ==
Achille Apolloni was born in Anagni in the Papal States on 13 May 1823 to a noble family. Beginning in 1842, he studied at the Jesuit College for Nobles, the Collegio Romano, and the Pontifical Academy of Ecclesiastical Nobles alongside "other young nobles, some of whom later rose to the top positions of the Catholic Church". He received an honorary doctorate in law in 1847. He was ordained a priest on 20 March 1850.

He was appointed a canon of the chapter of St. Peter's Basilica in 1851. He filled assignments as papal delegate in Rieti from 1854 and 1858 and in Macerata from 1859 to 1860; both towns were provincial capitals of the Papal States. He became an auditor of the Sacred Roman Rota in 1867 and in 1868 Pope Pius IX charged him managing the delivery of charity to relieve the victims of the cholera epidemic in Albano.

In 1882, Pope Leo XIII named him president of the special commission for the relations between the Holy See and civil tribunals. He was named Vice-camerlengo of the Holy Roman Church on 3 December 1884.

Pope Leo made him a cardinal on 24 May 1889. He received his red biretta and was assigned the deaconry of San Cesareo in Palatio on 27 May 1889.

He died of a heart attack in Rome on 3 April 1893.
