= Berardo Bongiovanni =

Italian Roman Catholic prelate

Most Reverend Berardo Bongiovanni
- Bishop of Camerino
- Church: Catholic Church
- Diocese: Diocese of Camerino
- In office: 1537–1574
- Predecessor: Giovanni Domenico de Cupis
- Successor: Alfonso Binarini
- Previous post: Apostolic Nuncio to Poland (1560–1563)

Personal details
- Died: 12 September 1574 Camerino, Italy

Berardo Bongiovanni (died 1574) was a Roman Catholic prelate who served as Bishop of Camerino (1537–1574) and Apostolic Nuncio to Poland (1560–1563).

== Biography ==
On 5 March 1537, Berardo Bongiovanni was appointed during the papacy of Pope Paul III as Bishop of Camerino. On 23 April 1560, he was appointed during the papacy of Pope Pius IV as Apostolic Nuncio to Poland. He resigned as Apostolic Nuncio to Poland on May 1563. He served as Bishop of Camerino until his death on 12 September 1574.

== Episcopal succession ==
Episcopal succession of Berardo Bongiovanni

While bishop, he was the principal consecrator of:

- Giovanni Andrea Mercurio, Archbishop of Manfredonia (1545);

and the principal co-consecrator of:

- Antonio Bernardo de Mirandola, Bishop of Caserta (1552);
- Mario Carafa, Archbishop of Naples (1566); and
- Pietro Lunello, Bishop of Gaeta (1566).

== External links and additional sources ==
- Cheney, David M. "Archdiocese of Camerino–San Severino Marche". Catholic-Hierarchy.org. (for Chronology of Bishops) ^{[self-published]}
- Chow, Gabriel. "Archdiocese of Camerino–San Severino Marche (Italy)". GCatholic.org. (for Chronology of Bishops) ^{[self-published]}
- Cheney, David M. "Nunciature to Poland". Catholic-Hierarchy.org. (for Chronology of Bishops) ^{[self-published]}
- Chow, Gabriel. "Apostolic Nunciature Poland". GCatholic.org. (for Chronology of Bishops) ^{[self-published]}

Catholic Church titles
Preceded by Camillo Mentovato	Apostolic Nuncio to Poland; 1560–1563	Succeeded by Gianfrancesco Commendone
Preceded by Giovanni Domenico de Cupis	Bishop of Camerino; 1537–1574	Succeeded by Alfonso Binarini
