= Innico Caracciolo (cardinal, born 1607) =

17th-century Roman Catholic cardinal

His Eminence Innico Caracciolo
- Cardinal-Priest of San Clemente; Archbishop of Naples
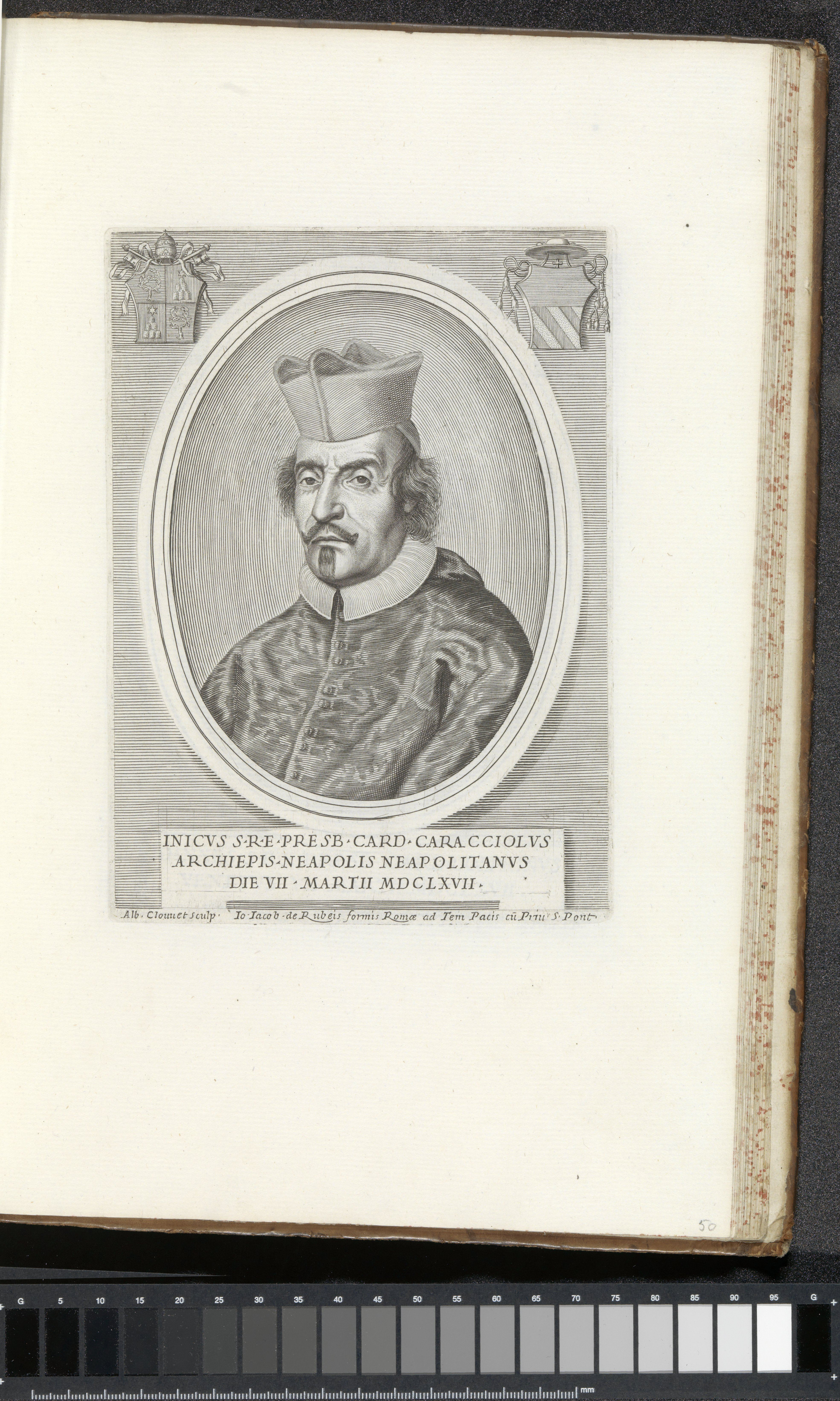
- A drawing of Innico Caracciolo the Elder
- Church: Catholic Church

Orders
- Consecration: 9 Oct 1667

Personal details
- Born: 7 Mar 1607 Naples, Italy
- Died: 6 September 1685 (age 77) Naples, Italy

Innico Caracciolo the Elder (7 March 1607, Airola – 6 September 1685, Naples) was a Roman Catholic priest, cardinal and archbishop.

== Life ==
Cracciolo was the son of Francesco, 2nd Duke of Airola and Isabella Guevara, Duchess of Bovino. This made him the uncle of cardinal Innico Caracciolo the Younger.

He studied under the Jesuits in Naples and later studied philosophy and law. He moved to Rome and took several minor posts in the Roman Curia. Under Pope Urban VIII, he was made protonotary apostolic, 'referendario' to the tribunals of the Segnatura Apostolica di Giustizia e di Grazia, cleric of the Camera Apostolica and president of the Annona. He was judge of the Fabbrica di San Pietro, 'relatore' of the Sacra Congregazione del Buon Governo and of the electors of the Tribunale della Segnatura Apostolica under pope Clement X. He was deacon of the clerics of the Camera Apostolica.

He was made a cardinal in pectore at the 15 February 1666 consistory, with his appointment made public on 7 March 1667—the same date he was made Archbishop of Naples. He participated in the conclave of 1667 which elected pope Clement IX. He received the cardinal's biretta and the titulus of San Clemente on 18 July 1667. He also took part in the papal conclave, 1669-1670 which elected Clement X. He celebrated diocesan synods in 1669, 1672, 1676 and 1680. He took part in a third conclave in 1676, which elected pope Innocent XI. He was buried in a marble tomb in Naples Cathedral in the form of a tabernacle held up by four columns that was designed by Pietro Ghetti.

== Episcopal succession ==
Episcopal succession of Innico Caraccioloi

While bishop, he was the principal consecrator of:

- Matteo Cosentino, Bishop of Anglona-Tursi (1667);
- Alessandro Diotallevi, Bishop of Pesaro (1667);
- Francesco Antonio Curzio, Bishop of Bovino (1670);
- Salvatore Scaglione, Bishop of Castellammare di Stabia (1678); and
- Gaetano Caracciolo, Archbishop of Conza (1682).

Catholic Church titles
Preceded by Ascanio Filomarino	Archbishop of Naples; 1557–1685	Succeeded by Antonio Pignatelli del Rastrello
Preceded by Vincenzo Maculani	Cardinal-Priest of San Clemente; 1667–1685	Succeeded by Ferdinando d'Adda
