= Mario Carafa =

Roman Catholic prelate

Most Reverend Mario Carafa
- Archbishop of Naples
- Church: Catholic Church
- Archdiocese: Archdiocese of Naples
- In office: 1565–1576
- Predecessor: Alfonso Carafa
- Successor: Paul Burali d'Arezzo

Orders
- Consecration: 10 February 1566 by Giovanni Michele Saraceni

Personal details
- Died: 11 September 1576 Naples, Italy

Mario Carafa (died 1576) was a Roman Catholic prelate who served as Archbishop of Naples (1565–1576).

On 26 October 1565, Mario Carafa was appointed during the papacy of Pope Pius IV as Archbishop of Naples. On 10 February 1566, he was ordained bishop by Giovanni Michele Saraceni, Cardinal-Priest of Santa Maria in Trastevere, with Paolo Emilio Verallo, Bishop of Capaccio, and Berardo Bongiovanni, Bishop of Camerino, serving as co-consecrators. He served as Archbishop of Naples until his death on 11 September 1576.

Catholic Church titles
Preceded by Alfonso Carafa	Archbishop of Naples; 1565–1576	Succeeded by Paul Burali d'Arezzo
