= Vincenzo Sarnelli =

Vincenzo Sarnelli may refer to:

- Tony Tammaro, stage name of the Italian musician Vincenzo Sarnelli
- Vincenzo Maria Sarnelli, 19th-century Italian Catholic bishop
