= Prospero Caffarelli (died 1659) =

Prospero Caffarelli (c. 1593 - 14 August 1659) was an Italian cardinal.

== Life ==
Born in Rome, he was the son of Pantasilea Astalli and her husband Alessandro Caffarelli, who was made a conservatore of Rome in 1608. The Caffarelli family was in financial difficulties but Prospero's mother was related to Pope Paul V, paving the way for his career in the Roman Curia. His offices included Auditor General of the Apostolic Camera, Protonotary Apostolic, 'ponente' of the Sacra Consulta, referendary of the Supreme Tribunal of the Apostolic Signatura and canon of St John Lateran.

Pope Innocent X made him a cardinal in the consistory of 2 March 1654 and he took part in the papal conclave the following year.

He died in Rome and was buried in the family tomb in Santa Maria sopra Minerva. He left his entire estate to the sacristy of St Peter's Basilica, of which he had been a canon.

Catholic Church titles
Preceded by Tiberio Cenci	Cardinal-presbyter of San Callisto; 1654-1659	Succeeded by Vincenzo Costaguti
