= Alfonso Castaldo =

Italian cardinal

His Eminence Alfonso Castaldo
- Cardinal, Archbishop of Naples
- Church: Catholic Church
- Archdiocese: Naples
- Appointed: 7 February 1958
- Term ended: 3 March 1966
- Predecessor: Marcello Mimmi
- Successor: Corrado Ursi
- Other posts: Bishop of Pozzuoli (1958–66); Cardinal-Priest of San Callisto (1958–66)
- Previous posts: Bishop of Pozzuoli (1934–50); Titular Archbishop of Thessalonica (1950–58); Coadjutor Archbishop of Naples (1950–58)

Orders
- Ordination: 8 June 1913 by Angelo Michele Jannachino
- Consecration: 30 June 1934 by Alessio Ascalesi
- Created cardinal: 15 December 1958 by John XXIII
- Rank: Cardinal-Priest

Personal details
- Born: 6 November 1890 Casoria, Kingdom of Italy
- Died: 3 March 1966 (aged 75) Naples, Italy
- Education: University of Naples
- Motto: Non dormitabit neque dormiet
- Coat of arms

Styles of Alfonso Castaldo
- Reference style: His Eminence
- Spoken style: Your Eminence
- Informal style: Cardinal
- See: Naples

Alfonso Castaldo (6 November 1890 – 3 March 1966) was an Italian cardinal of the Roman Catholic Church. He served as Archbishop of Naples from 1958 until his death, and was elevated to the cardinalate in 1958.

== Biography ==
Cardinal Alfonso Castaldo

Alfonso Castaldo was born in Casoria to Aniello Castaldo (died c. 1897) and Marianna Crispino. The third of five children, he was baptized in his home four days later, on 10 November, by his paternal uncle, who was a canon by the same name, with the permission of the Naples curia. Castaldo, influenced by Monsignor Francesco Morano and Father Luigi Maglione, decided to pursue a career in the Church, and attended the seminaries in Cerreto Sannita, Pozzuoli, and Naples. He also studied philosophy and letters at the University of Naples.

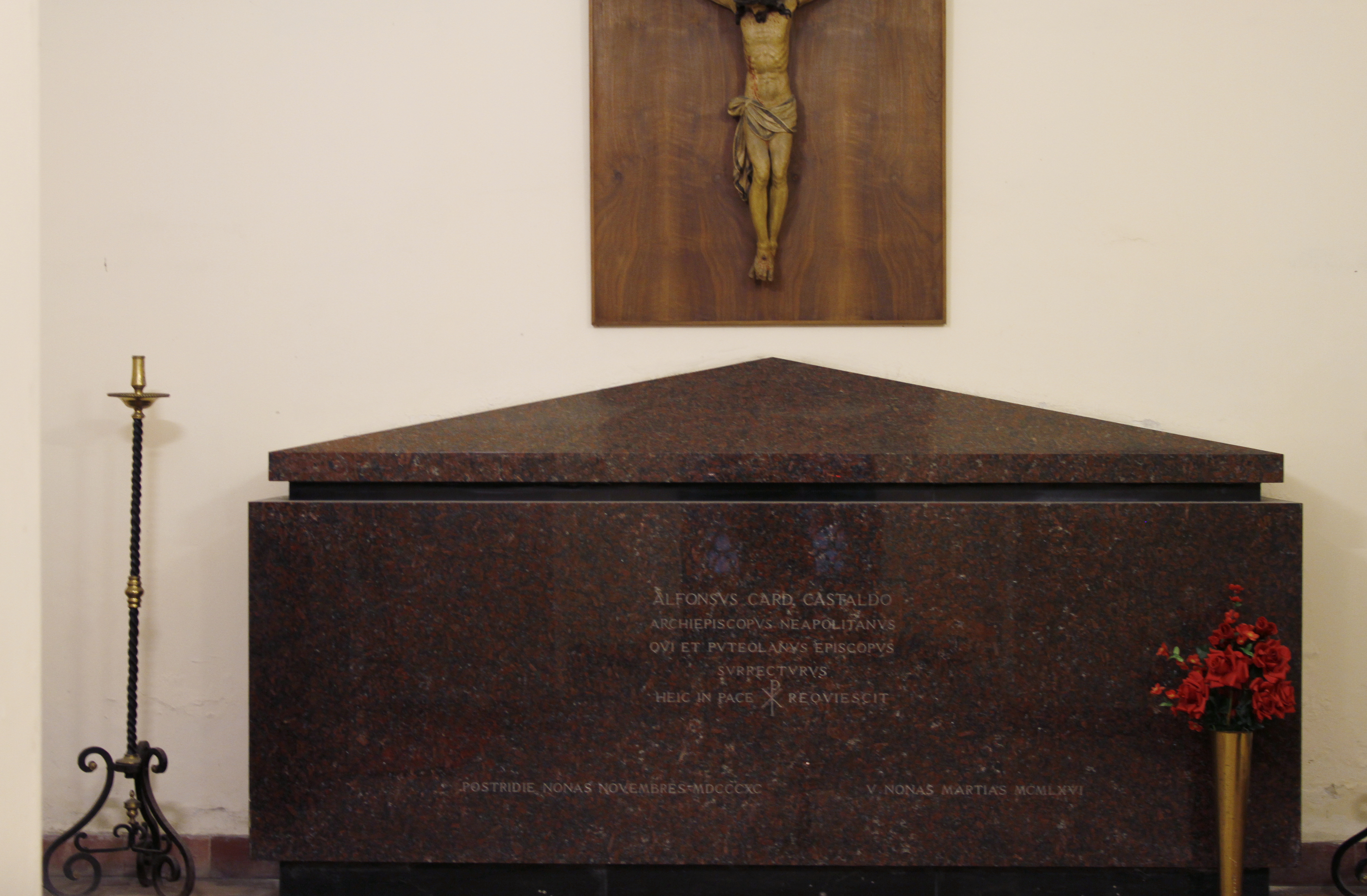
Tomb of Alfonso Castaldo in the Cathedral of Naples

Ordained a priest by Bishop Angelo Jannacchino on 8 June 1913, Castaldo served as a chaplain to the Italian Army (1915–1918), and a provost in Casoria (1918–1934). On 27 March 1934, he was appointed Bishop of Pozzuoli by Pope Pius XI. Castaldo received his episcopal consecration on the following 30 June from Cardinal Alessio Ascalesi, CPPS, with Bishops Salvatore del Bene and Salvatore Meo serving as co-consecrators.

Pope Pius XII named him coadjutor archbishop of Naples, titular archbishop of Thessalonica, and apostolic administrator of Pozzuoli on 14 January 1950. Castaldo became Archbishop of Naples on 7 February 1958 and was created cardinal priest of S. Callisto by Pope John XXIII in the consistory of 15 December that same year. On the following 5 August, he was named Bishop ad personam of Pozzuoli.

The Cardinal attended the Second Vatican Council from 1962 to 1965, and was one of the electors who participated in the 1963 papal conclave, which selected Pope Paul VI. He was highly revered by the people of Naples, and was very involved in welfare, charitable, and educational activities.

Castaldo died in his archiepiscopal residence in Naples at age 75. He is buried in the Succorpo Chapel in the Cathedral of Naples.

Catholic Church titles
Preceded by Giuseppe Petrone	Bishop of Pozzuoli; 1934–1950	Succeeded by Salvatore Sorrentino
Preceded by Marcello Mimmi	Archbishop of Naples; 1958–1966	Succeeded by Corrado Ursi
