= Pomponius of Naples =

Italian Roman Catholic saint

Saint Pomponius

Bishop of Naples
- Died: 536
- Venerated in: Roman Catholic Church
- Canonized: Pre-congregation
- Feast: 30 April

Pomponius was Bishop of Naples, known for his opposition of Arianism. Theodoric the Great, ruled most of the Italian Peninsula, at the time at which Pomponius was the head of his see. Theodoric was known as an Arian, but Pomponius remained firm in his convictions.
