= Guglielmo Sanfelice d'Acquavilla =

His Eminence Guglielmo Sanfelice d'Acquavilla O.S.B. Cas.
- Cardinal, Archbishop of Naples
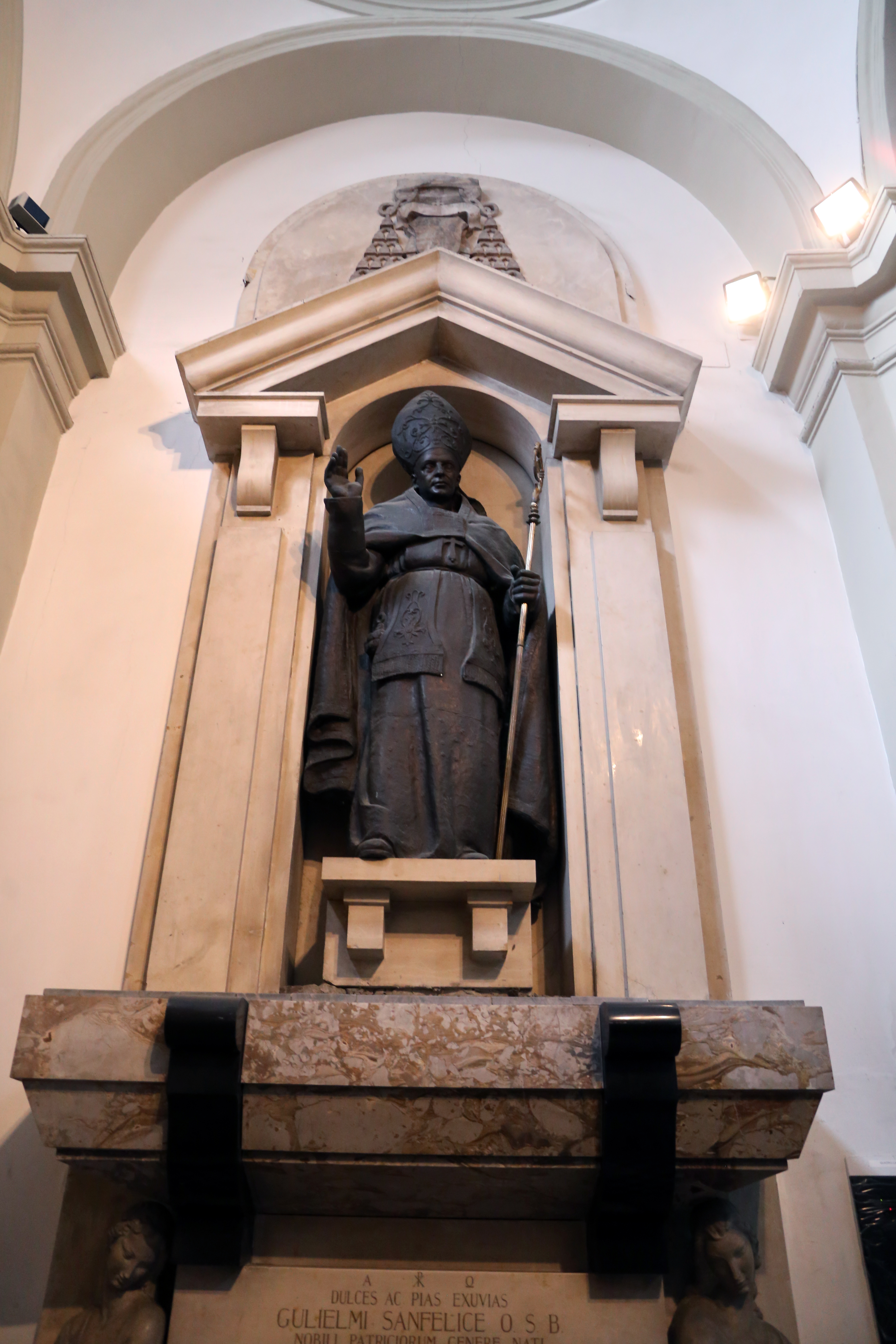
- Church: Catholic Church
- Archdiocese: Naples
- Appointed: 15 July 1878
- Term ended: 3 January 1897
- Predecessor: Sisto Riario Sforza
- Successor: Vincenzo Maria Sarnelli
- Other post: Cardinal-Priest of San Clemente (1884–97)

Orders
- Ordination: 15 March 1857
- Consecration: 21 July 1878 by Alessandro Franchi
- Created cardinal: 24 March 1884 by Leo XIII
- Rank: Cardinal-Priest

Personal details
- Born: Guglielmo Sanfelice d'Acquavilla; 14 April 1834 Aversa, Kingdom of the Two Sicilies
- Died: 3 January 1897 (aged 62) Naples, Kingdom of Italy
- Buried: Naples Cathedral
- Parents: Giuseppe Sanfelice d'Acquavilla; Giovanna Di Martino
- Education: University of Naples
- Coat of arms

Guglielmo Sanfelice d'Acquavilla O.S.B.Cas. (14 April 1834 – 3 January 1897) was a Cardinal of the Roman Catholic Church and Archbishop of Naples.

== Biography ==
Sanfelice d'Acquavilla was born in Aversa, Italy, on 14 April 1834.

He was appointed Archbishop of Naples in 1878 and served until his death in 1897.

He was made cardinal by Pope Leo XIII in 1884.

Sanfelice d'Acquavilla died in Naples on 3 January 1897.

Catholic Church titles
| Preceded by Sisto Riario Sforza | Archbishop of Naples; 1878–1897 | Succeeded by Giuseppe Antonio Ermenegildo Prisco |
| Preceded by Henri-Marie-Gaston Boisnormand de Bonnechose | Cardinal Priest of San Clemente; 24 March 1884 - 3 January 1897 | Succeeded by Guillaume-Marie-Romain Sourrieu |
