= Vincenzo Maria Sarnelli =

Italian Catholic archbishop

Servant of God Vincenzo Maria Sarnelli
- Metropolitan Archbishop of Naples
- Church: Catholic Church
- Archdiocese: Naples
- Appointed: 19 April 1897
- Installed: 11 July 1897
- Term ended: 7 January 1898
- Predecessor: Guglielmo Sanfelice d'Acquavella
- Successor: Giuseppe Antonio Ermenegildo Prisco
- Previous post: Bishop of Castellammare di Stabia (1879–1897)

Orders
- Ordination: 20 December 1862
- Consecration: 2 March 1879 by Luigi Maria Bilio

Personal details
- Born: Vincenzo Maria Sarnelli; 5 April 1835 Naples, Kingdom of the Two Sicilies
- Died: 7 January 1898 (aged 62) Naples, Kingdom of Italy

Ordination history
History
Episcopal consecration
- Principal consecrator: Luigi Bilio
- Co-consecrators: Fulco Luigi Ruffo-Scilla, Francesco Folicaldi

Vincenzo Maria Sarnelli (5 April 1835 – 7 January 1898) was an Italian Catholic archbishop. He served as the Bishop of Castellammare di Stabia from 1879 to 1897 and then as the Metropolitan Archbishop of Naples from 1897 to 1898. Following the opening of his beatification process, he was named a Servant of God.

== Biography ==
=== Early life ===
Vincenzo Maria Sarnelli was born on 5 April 1835 in Naples, Italy to Nicola and Adelaide. He was baptized on the day of his birth. At the age of seven, he was orphaned and received his First Communion at the age of ten. He was then confirmed on 2 June 1846.

He began studying law at the University of Naples and, while there, decided to enter the priesthood. He was ordained a priest on 20 December 1862 and continued his studies, with a theological-juridical specialization. The Archbishop of Naples, Cardinal Sisto Riario Sforza, sent Sarnelli to Rome to further study canon law from 1868 to 1869.

Upon returning to Naples, Sforza made Sarnelli responsible for teaching canon law at the Archepiscopal Athenaeum and history at the Troise Lyceum. In May 1875, Sarnelli was appointed pastor of the Church of Santa Maria Avvocata in Piazza Dante of Naples.

=== Episcopal ministry ===
Sarnelli was then appointed coadjutor bishop to Francesco Petagna, the Bishop of Castellammare di Stabia. Upon Petagna's death on 18 December 1878, Sarnelli succeeded him as Bishop of Catellammare di Stabia, being officially appointed by Pope Leo XIII on 28 February 1879 and receiving his episcopal consecration on 2 March 1879. He took possession of the diocese on 30 March. During the Italian cholera epidemic of 1884, he was awarded the Medal of the Presidency of the Italian Republic for his ministry to the afflicted and for his material generosity to the poor.

Sarnelli became a tertiary of the Servite Order and wrote a book about the seven founding saints of the order. On 19 April 1897, Pope Leo XIII appointed him Metropolitan Archbishop of Naples, of which diocese he took possession on 11 July 1897. Shortly after becoming Archbishop of Naples, Sarnelli became ill and, on 2 January 1898, died and was buried in the cemetery of Santa Maria del Pianto.

=== Beatification process ===
Sarnelli was said to have predicted his own death. Shortly after his death, the cause of canonization was begun, thereby posthumously conferring on him the title Servant of God. It was said that during his time as bishop, Sarnelli never spent more than one lira per day, donating the rest of his income to the poor and the maintenance of the cathedral.

On 7 January 1898, the vicar capitular of Naples, Carbonelli, placed Sarnelli's body in "canonical deposit", as was custom when there where tumultuous circumstances and a process of beatification was beginning. By 6 July 1898, a postulator had already been appointed to investigate the cause. The Compassionist Sisters, of which Blessed Maria Maddalena Starace (a close friend of Sarnelli) was the founder, undertook support of Sarnelli's cause in 1999, and on 17 November 1999, the Congregation for the Causes of Saints granted the Archbishop of Naples the ability to authorize the start of the beatification process. On 6 July 1973, his remains were moved to the Church of Santa Maria Avvocata, of which he was once pastor.

Catholic Church titles
Preceded by Francesco Petagna	Bishop of Castellammare di Stabia; 28 February 1879–19 April 1897	Succeeded by Michele de Jorio
Preceded by Guglielmo Sanfelice d'Acquavella	Metropolitan Archbishop of Naples; 19 April 1897–7 January 1898	Succeeded by Giuseppe Antonio Ermenegildo Prisco
