= Gaspard de Diano =

Italian Roman Catholic prelate (1389–1451)

Most Reverend Gaspard de Diano
- Archbishop of Naples
- Church: Catholic Church
- Archdiocese: Archdiocese of Naples
- In office: 1438–1451
- Successor: Rinaldo Piscicello

Personal details
- Born: 1389
- Died: 29 April 1451 (age 62) Naples, Italy

Gaspard de Diano or Gaspare de Diano (1389–1451) was a Roman Catholic prelate who served as Archbishop of Naples (1438–1451), Archbishop of Conza (1422–1438), and Bishop of Teano (1412–1422).

== Biography ==
Gaspard de Diano was born in 1389. On 30 June 1412, he was appointed during the papacy of Pope Gregory XII as Bishop of Teano. On 20 May 1422, he was appointed during the papacy of Pope Martin V as Archbishop of Conza. On 21 February 1438, he was appointed during the papacy of Pope Eugene IV as Archbishop of Naples. He served as Archbishop of Naples until his death on 29 April 1451.

== Episcopal succession ==
While bishop, he was the principal consecrator of:

- Antonio Scorbillo, Bishop of Mileto (1437); and
- Basilio Maupretis, Titular Bishop of Tanis (1439).

== External links and additional sources ==
- Cheney, David M. "Diocese of Teano". Catholic-Hierarchy.org. (for Chronology of Bishops) ^{[self-published]}
- Chow, Gabriel. "Diocese of Teano–Calvi (Italy)". GCatholic.org. (for Chronology of Bishops) ^{[self-published]}
- Cheney, David M. "Archdiocese of Sant'Angelo dei Lombardi-Conza-Nusco-Bisaccia". Catholic-Hierarchy.org. (for Chronology of Bishops) ^{[self-published]}
- Chow, Gabriel. "Archdiocese of Sant'Angelo dei Lombardi-Conza-Nusco-Bisaccia (Italy)". GCatholic.org. (for Chronology of Bishops) ^{[self-published]}
- Cheney, David M. "Archdiocese of Napoli {Naples}". Catholic-Hierarchy.org. (for Chronology of Bishops) ^{[self-published]}
- Chow, Gabriel. "Metropolitan Diocese of Napoli (Italy)". GCatholic.org. (for Chronology of Bishops) ^{[self-published]}

Catholic Church titles
Preceded by	Bishop of Teano; 1412–1422	Succeeded by
Preceded by	Archbishop of Conza; 1422–1438	Succeeded by Latino Orsini
Preceded by	Archbishop of Naples; 1438–1451	Succeeded by Rinaldo Piscicello
