= Giambattista Costaguti =

Italian cardinal (1636–1704)

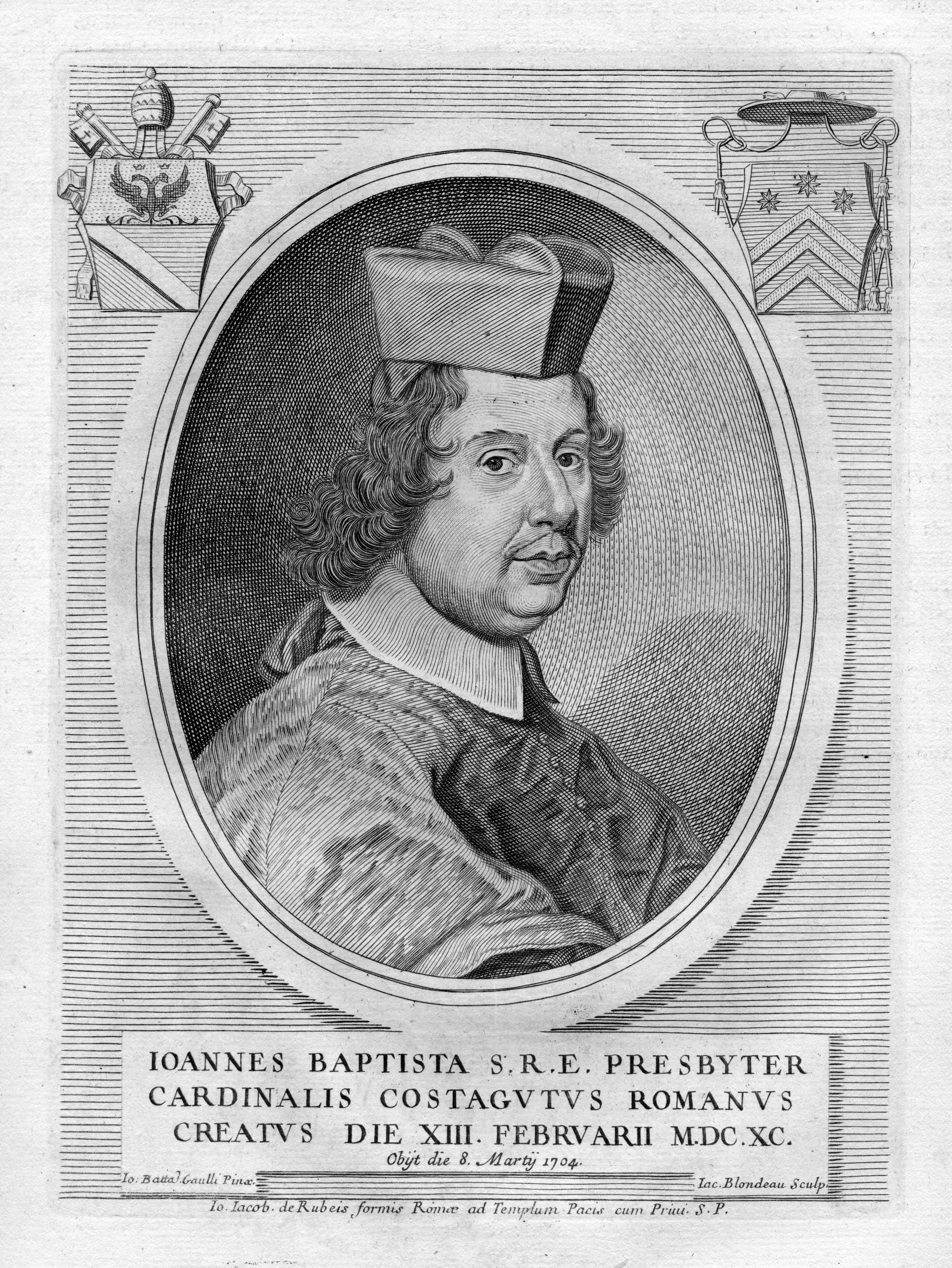
- Giambattista Costaguti
- Born: 1636; Rome, Papal States
- Died: March 8, 1704 (aged 67–68)
- Burial place: San Carlo ai Catinari
- Parents: Prospero Costaguti; Rocca Elvezia, Countess Vidman
- Relatives: Vincenzo Costaguti (half-brother)

Giambattista Costaguti (1636–1704) was a Catholic cardinal from 1690 to 1704.

== Biography ==
Giambattista Costaguti was born in Rome in 1636, the son of Prospero Costaguti, marquis of Sipicciano (a member of the Genoese nobility) and of his second wife Rocca Elvezia, Countess Vidman. He was the younger half-brother of Vincenzo Costaguti, who became a cardinal in 1643.

Costaguti entered the church as a young man, serving as a clerk in the Apostolic Camera, and rising to become its dean in 1669.

In the consistory of February 13, 1690, Pope Alexander VIII made him a cardinal priest. On April 10, 1690, he received the red hat and the titular church of San Bernardo alle Terme. He participated in the papal conclave of 1691 that elected Pope Innocent XII. He opted for the titular church of Sant'Anastasia on November 12, 1691. He later participated in the papal conclave of 1700 that elected Pope Clement XI.

He died on March 8, 1704 and is buried in San Carlo ai Catinari.
