= San Callisto =

- St. Callistus; S. Calixti (in Latin)
- Chiesa di San Calisto
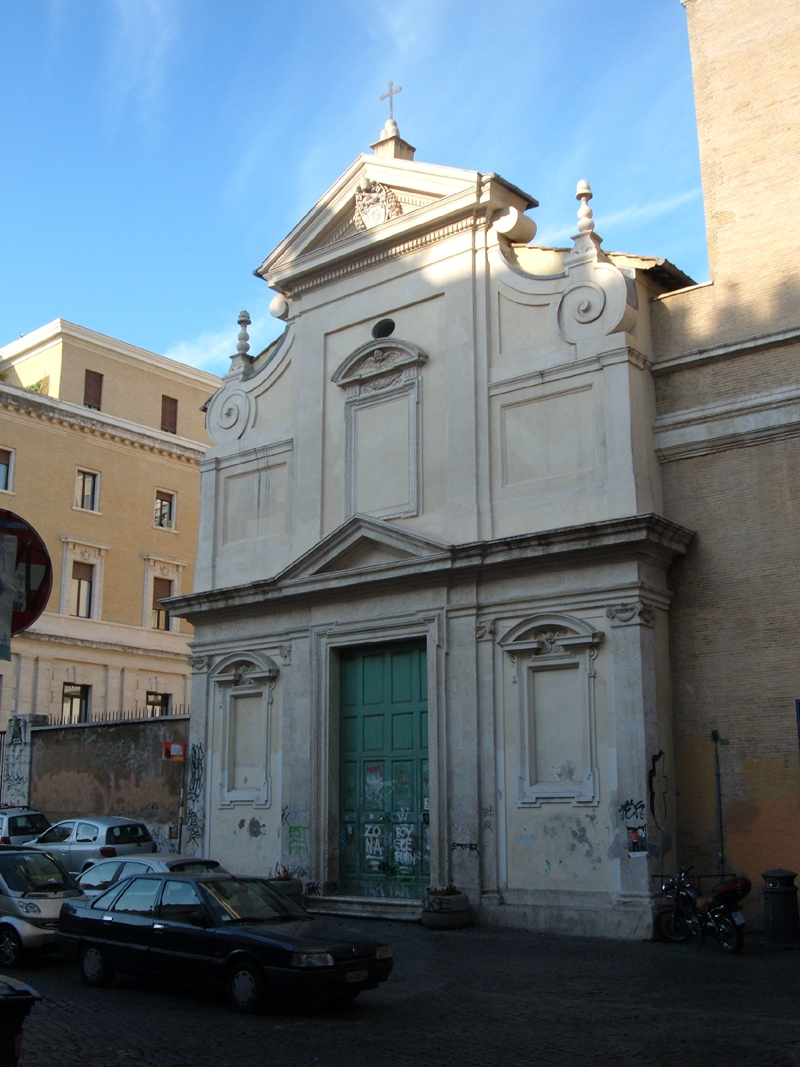
- Facade of San Callisto.
- Click on the map for a fullscreen view
- 41°53′20.56″N 12°28′13.75″E
- Location: Piazza di San Calisto, Rome
- Country: Italy
- Denomination: Roman Catholic
- Tradition: Roman Rite
- Website: Official website

History
- Status: Titular church
- Dedication: Pope Callixtus I

Architecture
- Architect: Orazio Torriani
- Architectural type: Church
- Groundbreaking: 8th century AD
- Completed: 1613

Administration
- Province: Diocese of Rome

San Callisto (English: Saint Callixtus, Latin: S. Calixti) is a Roman Catholic titular church in Rome, Italy, built over the site of Pope Callixtus I's martyrdom (c. AD 222).

== History ==
The original building dates from the time of Pope Gregory III (r. 731–741), who ordered the building of a church on the site. The church has been rebuilt twice since, first in the twelfth century, and the current church restored in 1610 by Orazio Torriani for the Benedictine monks of Montecassino.

In January 2017, in response to Pope Francis's call for an increase in aid to the homeless, especially during the cold winter weather, the Community of Sant'Egidio opened San Callisto as an overnight shelter, with a hot meal available at a nearby cafeteria.

Established in 1517, the Titulus San Calixti is currently held by Willem Jacobus Cardinal Eijk.

== Architecture ==
The seventeenth-century facade carried the coat of arms of Paul V. The altarpiece, by, Avanzino Nucci, depicts the "Glora di San Callisto". The church has a single aisle with a chapel on either side. Within the chapel to the right, two angels attributed to Gian Lorenzo Bernini support a painting by Pier Leone Ghezzi. The chapel on the left contains the well where Callistus I, later venerated as a saint, was martyred.

== List of titular cardinal-priests ==
- Francesco Armellini Pantalassi de' Medici (6 July 1517 – 22 November 1523)
- Alonso Manrique de Lara (17 April 1531 – 12 July 1532)
- Jacopo Sadoleto (15 January 1537 – 11 May 1545)
- Sebastiano Antonio Pighini (27 June 1552 – 23 November 1553)
- Pietro Tagliavia d’Aragonia (17 July 1555 – 5 August 1558)
- Ludovico Madruzzo (3 June 1561 – 4 April 1562)
- Innocenzo Ciocchi Del Monte (4 May 1562 – 17 November 1564)
- Angelo Nicolini (15 May 1565 – 15 August 1567)
- Gianpaolo Della Chiesa (5 April 1568 – 14 May 1570)
- Marcantonio Maffei (9 June 1570 – 22 August 1583)
- Lanfranco Margotti (10 December 1608 – 11 January 1610)
- François de La Rochefoucauld (1 February 1610 – 14 February 1645)
- Tiberio Cenci (24 April 1645 – 26 February 1653)
- Prospero Caffarelli (23 March 1654 – 14 August 1659)
- Vincenzo Costaguti (19 July 1660 – 6 December 1660)
- Pietro Vidoni (4 July 1661 – 13 March 1673)
- Fabrizio Spada (23 March 1676 – 23 May 1689)
- Nicolò Acciaioli (28 November 1689 – 28 September 1693)
- Toussaint de Forbin-Janson (28 September 1693 – 24 March 1713)
- Gianantonio Davia (30 August 1713 – 19 November 1725)
- Prospero Marefoschi (19 November 1725 – 20 September 1728)
- Leandro Porzia (20 September 1728 – 2 June 1740)
- Henri-Osvald de la Tour d'Auvergne de Bouillon (16 September 1740 –- 23 April 1747)
- Silvio Valenti Gonzaga (15 May 1747 –- 9 April 1753)
- Fortunato Tamburini (9 April 1753 – 9 August 1761)
- Urbano Paracciani Rutili (15 June 1767 – 2 January 1777)
- Tommaso Maria Ghilini (20 July 1778 – 17 February 1783)
- Barnaba Chiaramonti (26 June 1785 – 14 March 1800) later Pope Pius VII
- Carlo Giuseppe Filippa della Martiniana (2 April 1800 – 7 December 1802)
- Antonio Despuig y Dameto (26 September 1803 – 2 May 1813)
- Domenico Spinucci (29 April 1816 – 21 December 1823)
- Bartolomeo Alberto Cappellari (3 July 1826 – 2 February 1831) later Pope Gregory XVI
- Luigi Lambruschini (24 February 1832 – 24 January 1842)
- Luigi Vannicelli Casoni (27 January 1842 – 4 October 1847)
- Thomas-Marie-Joseph Gousset (10 April 1851 – 22 December 1866)
- Jean Baptiste François Pitra (22 February 1867 - 12 May 1879)
- Gustav Adolf von Hohenlohe-Schillingsfürst (10 November 1884 – 2 December 1895)
- Isidoro Verga (22 June 1896 – 30 November 1896)
- Agostino Ciasca (22 June 1899 – 6 February 1902)
- Carlo Nocella (25 June 1903 – 22 July 1908)
- Antonio Vico (2 December 1912 – 6 December 1915)
- Alessio Ascalesi (7 December 1916 – 11 May 1952)
- Marcello Mimmi (15 January 1953 – 9 June 1958)
- Alfonso Castaldo (18 December 1958 – 3 March 1966)
- Corrado Ursi (29 June 1967 – 29 September 2003)
- Willem Jacobus Eijk (18 February 2012 – )
