= Nostrianus =

Italian Roman Catholic saint

Saint Nostrianus

Bishop of Naples
- Venerated in: Roman Catholic Church
- Canonized: Pre-congregation
- Feast: 14 February

Nostrianus was Bishop of Naples, known for his opposition to Arianism and Pelagianism. In 439, he gave shelter to Bishop Quodvultdeus of Carthage, after the city's sacking by the Vandals.
