= List of bishops and archbishops of Naples =

The Archdiocese of Naples (Latin: Archidioecesis Neapolitana) is a Latin Catholic archdiocese in southern Italy, the see being in Naples. A Christian community was founded there in the 1st century AD and the diocese of Naples was raised to the level of an archdiocese in the 10th century. Two archbishops of Naples have been elected pope, Paul IV and Innocent XII.

Bishops of Naples
| Name | Years |
|---|---|
| Asprenas | |
| Epithymetus | |
| Maro | |
| Probus | |
| Paulus I | |
| Agrippinus | |
| Eustathius | |
| Ephebus (Euphebius) | |
| Calepodius | attested 343 |
| St Fortunatus I | attested 344 |
| Maximus | banned 356 |
| Zosimus | c. 356 – c. 362 |
| Severus | c. 362 – c. 408 |
| Ursus | |
| John I | † 432 |
| Nostrianus | 432 – after 452 |
| Timasius | |
| Felix | |
| Soter | attested 465 |
| Victor I | c. 492/6 |
| Stephen I | c. 499/501 |
| Pomponius | |
| John II Mediocris | |
| Vincent | 554 – 578 |
| Redux | 581 – ? |
| Demetrius | ? – 591 |
| Fortunatus II | 593 – 600 |
| Paschasius | 600 – ? |
| John III | |
| Caesarius | |
| Gratiosus | |
| Eusebius | |
| Leontius | attested 649 |
| Adeodatus | |
| Agnellus | attested 680 |
| Julianus | ? – 701 |
| Laurentius | 701 – 717/8 |
| Sergius I | 717/8 – ? |
| Cosmas | |
| Calvus | 750 – 763 |
| Paul II | 763 – 768 |
| Stephen II | 767/8 – 799/800 |
| Paul III | c. 800 – 821 |
| Tiberius | 821 – 841 |
| John IV | c. 842 – 849 |
| Athanasius I | 849 – 872 |
| Athanasius II | 876 (875?) – 898 |
| Stephen III | 898 – ? |
| Athanasius III | 937 – ? |
| Nicetas | 962 – ? |
| Gregory I | 966 – ? |
Archbishops of Naples
| Sergius II | 1005–1033 |
| John V | 1033–1045 |
| Victor II | 1045–1059 |
| Sergius III | 1059–1071 |
| John VI | 1071–1080 |
| Landulf | 1080–1094 |
| Peter I | 1094–1100 |
| Gregory II | 1116–1118 |
| Marinus | 1118–1151 |
| Sergius IV | 1176–1190 |
| Anselm | 1191–1214 |
| Thomas of Capua | 1215–1216 |
| Peter II of Sorrento | 1217–1247 |
| Bernadino Caracciolo dei Rossi | 1252–1262 |
| Delfino | 1262–1266 |
| Aiglerio de Borgogna | 1266–1281 |
| Filippo Minutolo | 1288–1301 |
| Beato Giacomo da Viterbo | 1302–1307 |
| Uberto d'Ormont | 1308–1320 |
| Matteo Filomarino | 1322–1323 |
| Bertoldo Orsini | 1323–1326 |
| Annibale di Ceccano | 1326–1328 |
| Giovanni Orsini | 1328–1359 |
| Bertrando de Meyshones | 1359–1363 |
| Pietro de Grazia | 1363–1365 |
| Bernardo de Bouquet | 1365–1368 |
| Bernardo de Rhodez | 1368–1379 |
| Tommaso de Ammanati | 1379–1388 |
| Ludovico Bozzuto | 1378–1384 |
| Nicola Zanasio | 1384–1389 |
| Guglielmo Guindazzo | 1388–1399 |
| Enrico Capece Minutolo | 1389 |
| Nicola Pagano | 1399–1401 |
| Giordano Orsini | 1401–1405 |
| Giovanni Bozzutto | 1407–1415 |
| Giacomo dei Rossi | 1418–1435 |
| Nicola de Diano | 1418–1435 |
| Gaspare de Diano | 1438–1451 |
| Rinaldo Piscicello | 1451–1457 |
| Oliviero Carafa | 1458–1484 |
| Alessandro Carafa | 1484–1505 |
| Vincenzo Carafa | 1505–1530 |
| Francesco Carafa | 1530–1544 |
| Rainuccio Farnese | 1544–1549 |
| Gian Pietro Carafa | 1549–1555 |
| Alfonso Carafa | 1557–1565 |
| Mario Carafa | 1565–1576 |
| Beato Paolo Burali d'Arezzo, C.R. | 1576–1578 |
| Annibale di Capua | 1578–1595 |
| Alfonso Gesualdo di Conza (Gonza) | 1596–1603 |
| Ottavio Acquaviva d'Aragona (seniore) | 1605–1612 |
| Decio Carafa | 1613–1626 |
| Francesco Boncompagni | 1626–1641 |
| Ascanio Filomarino | 1641–1666 |
| Innico Caracciolo | 1667–1685 |
| Antonio Pignatelli | 1686–1691 |
| Giacomo Cantelmo | 1691–1702 |
| Francesco Pignatelli | 1703–1734 |
| Giuseppe Spinelli | 1734–1754 |
| Giuseppe Capece Zurlo | 1782–1802 |
| Luigi Ruffo-Scilla | 1802–1832 |
| Filippo Giudice Caracciolo | 1833–1844 |
| Sisto Riario Sforza | 1845–1877 |
| Guglielmo Sanfelice d'Acquavilla | 1878–1897 |
| Giuseppe Antonio Ermenegildo Prisco | 1898–1923 |
| Michele Zezza di Zapponeta | 1923–1923 |
| Alessio Ascalesi, C.PP.S. | 1924–1952 |
| Marcello Mimmi | 1952–1958 |
| Alfonso Castaldo | 1958–1966 |
| Corrado Ursi | 1966–1987 |
| Michele Giordano | 1987–2006 |
| Crescenzio Sepe | 2006-2020 |
| Domenico Battaglia | incumbent |
