= Marcello Mimmi =

Catholic cardinal (1882–1961)

His Eminence Marcello Mimmi
- Secretary of the Sacred Consistorial Congregation
- Church: Roman Catholic Church
- Appointed: 15 December 1957
- Term ended: 6 March 1961
- Predecessor: Adeodato Giovanni Piazza
- Successor: Carlo Confalonieri
- Other posts: President of the Pontifical Commission for Latin America (1958–1961); President of the Commission of Cardinals for the Shrine of Pompeii (1958–1961); Cardinal-Bishop of Sabina e Poggio Mirteto (1958–1961)
- Previous posts: Bishop of Crema (1930–1933); Archbishop of Bari e Canosa (1933–1952); Archbishop of Naples (1952–1957); Cardinal-Priest of San Callisto (1953–1958)

Orders
- Ordination: 23 December 1905 by Domenico Svampa
- Consecration: 25 July 1930 by Giovanni Battista Nasalli Rocca di Corneliano
- Created cardinal: 12 January 1953 by Pope Pius XII
- Rank: Cardinal-Priest

Personal details
- Born: Marcello Mimmi; 18 July 1882 San Pietro in Casale, Bologna, Kingdom of Italy
- Died: 6 March 1961 (aged 78) Rome, Italy
- Motto: Per visibilia et invisibilia ("Through the visible and invisible")
- Coat of arms

Styles of Marcello Mimmi
- Reference style: His Eminence
- Spoken style: Your Eminence
- Informal style: Cardinal
- See: Sabina e Poggio Mirteto (suburbicarian)

Marcello Mimmi (18 July 1882 – 6 March 1961) was an Italian Cardinal of the Roman Catholic Church. He served as Archbishop of Naples from 1952 to 1957, and Secretary of the Sacred Consistorial Congregation from 1957 until his death. Mimmi was elevated to the cardinalate in 1953 by Pope Pius XII.

== Life and church ==
Marcello Mimi was born in San Pietro in Casale and studied at the seminary in Bologna before being ordained to the priesthood on 23 December 1905. He then did pastoral work and taught at the Bologna seminary until 1930. He was elevated to a Privy Chamberlain of His Holiness on 19 November 1919, and later named rector of the Regional Seminary of Romagna.

On 30 June 1930, Mimmi was appointed Bishop of Crema by Pope Pius XI. He received his episcopal consecration on the following 25 July from Cardinal Giovanni Nasalli Rocca di Corneliano, with Bishops Ettore Lodi and Giovanni Franzini serving as co-consecrators. Mimmi was later named Archbishop of Bari on 31 July 1933, and Archbishop of Naples on 30 August 1952.

Pope Pius XII created him Cardinal-Priest of S. Callisto in the consistory of 12 January 1953. Mimmi served as papal legate to several ecclesiastical gatherings from 1955 to 1960.

On 15 December 1957, the Cardinal was made Secretary of the Sacred Consistorial Congregation in the Roman Curia. Mimmi later chose to be advanced to the rank of Cardinal Bishop, receiving the suburbicarian see of Sabina e Poggio Mirteto on 9 June 1958. He was also one of the cardinal electors who participated in the 1958 papal conclave that selected Pope John XXIII.

Mimmi died in Rome, at age 78. He is buried in the Cathedral of Magliano Sabina.

Mimmi also served as President of the Pontifical Commission for Latin America and of the Cardinalatial Commission for the Shrine of Pompeii from 1958 until his death.

Catholic Church titles
Preceded by Giacomo Montanelli	Bishop of Crema; 1930–1933	Succeeded by Francesco Franco
Preceded by Augusto Curi	Archbishop of Bari; 1933–1952	Succeeded by Enrico Nicodemo
Preceded by Alessio Ascalesi, CPPS	Archbishop of Naples; 1952–1957	Succeeded by Alfonso Castaldo
Preceded by Adeodato Giovanni Piazza, OCD	Secretary of the Sacred Consistorial Congregation; 1957–1961	Succeeded by Carlo Confalonieri
