= Corrado Ursi =

Italian prelate

His Eminence Corrado Ursi
- Cardinal, Archbishop emertius of Naples
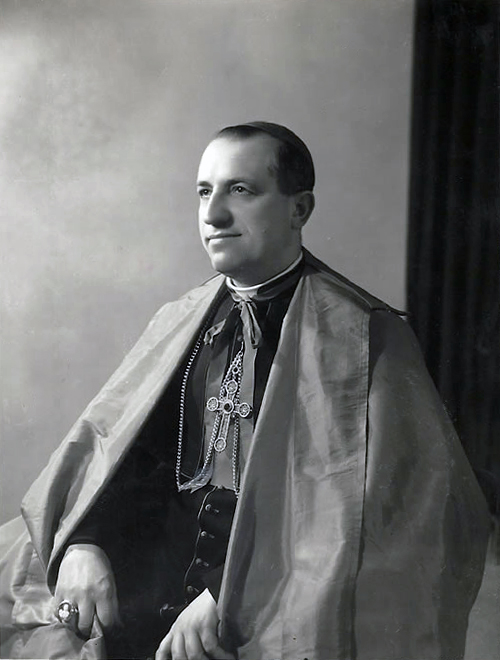
- Photograph of Ursi in 1956
- Archdiocese: Naples
- Appointed: 23 May 1966
- Term ended: 9 May 1987
- Predecessor: Alfonso Castaldo
- Successor: Michele Giordano
- Other post: Cardinal-Priest of San Callisto (1967–2003)
- Previous posts: Bishop of Nardò (1951–1961); Archbishop of Acerenza (1961–1966)

Orders
- Ordination: 25 July 1931
- Consecration: 30 September 1951 by Carlo Confalonieri
- Created cardinal: 26 June 1967 by Paul VI
- Rank: Cardinal-Priest

Personal details
- Born: Corrado Ursi; 26 July 1908 Andria, Kingdom of Italy
- Died: 29 August 2003 (aged 95) Naples, Italy
- Coat of arms

Styles of Corrado Ursi
- Reference style: His Eminence
- Spoken style: Your Eminence
- Informal style: Cardinal
- See: Naples

Corrado Ursi (26 July 1908 – 29 August 2003) was an Italian prelate of the Catholic Church. He served as Archbishop of Naples from 1966 to 1987, and was created a cardinal in 1967, given the titular church of San Callisto.

== Biography ==
Corrado Ursi was born in Andria, the son of a baker. He was baptized the day after his birth at the parish of San Agostino. After attending the seminary of Andria, he studied philosophy and theology at the Pontifical Regional Seminary of Molfetta. He was ordained a priest for the Diocese of Molfetta on 25 July 1931.

Shortly after his ordination, he became vice-rector of the Pontifical Regional Seminary of Molfetta. He was named rector a few months later, serving in that post until 1951. He did pastoral work in several Italian dioceses during the summer recesses, and became active in Azione Cattolica. He was named a privy chamberlain of his holiness on 15 July 1943.

In 1951, Pope Pius XII appointed Corrado Ursi Bishop of Nardò, a post that he held for 10 years. In 1961, he was transferred to the Archdiocese of Acerenza by Pope John XXIII. In 1966 Pope Paul VI appointed him archbishop of Naples and created him a cardinal a year later, assigning him the titular church of San Callisto. He participated in the papal conclaves of August and October in 1978.

Ursi died on 29 August 2003. At the time of his death he was one of the last two surviving cardinals elevated by Pope Paul VI in the 1967 consistory, along with Pope John Paul II, leaving Pope John Paul II the lone surviving member of that consistory.
