= Alfonso Carafa =

Italian cardinal

His Eminence Alfonso Carafa
- Archbishop of Naples
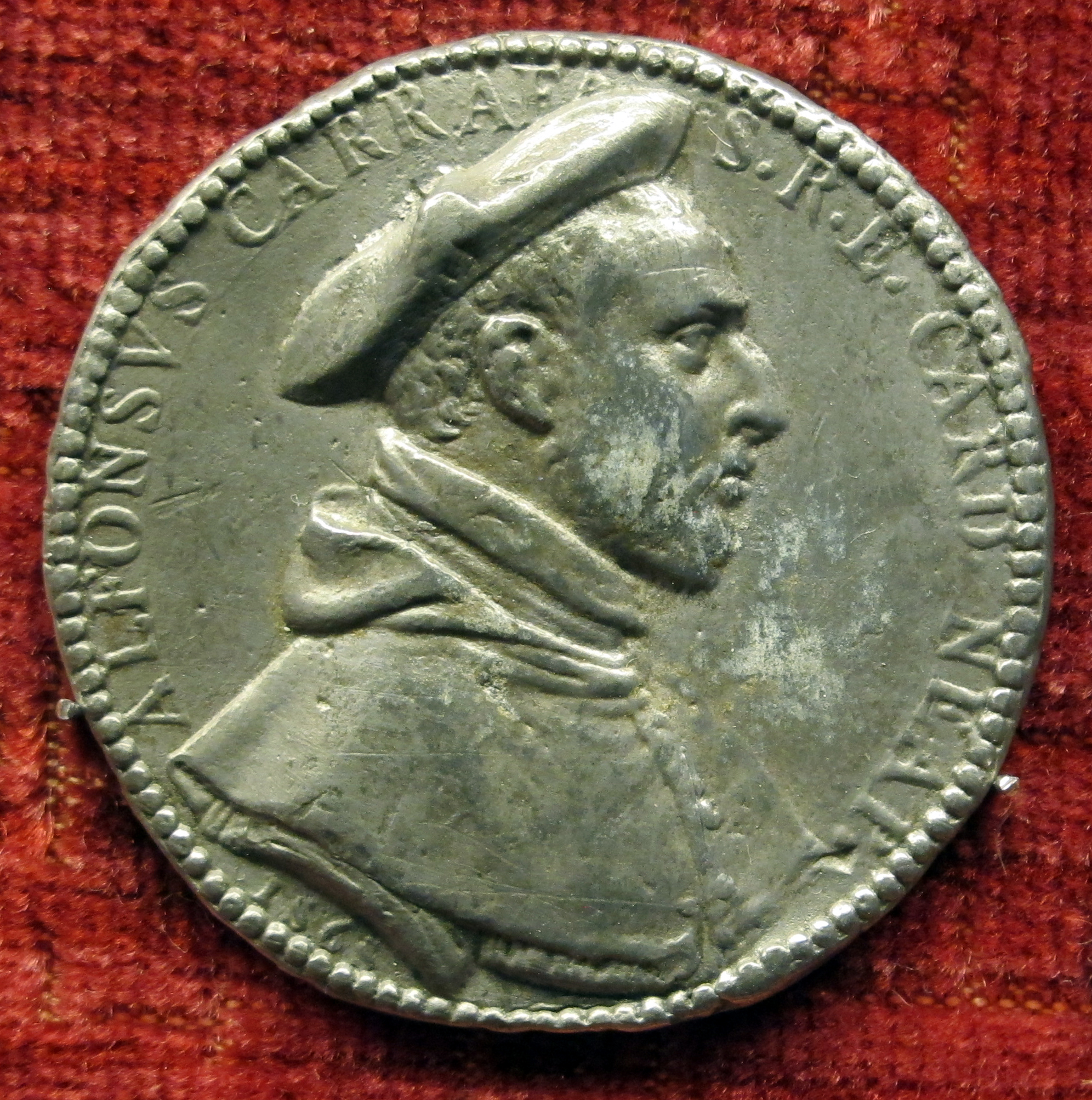
- Medal depicting Cardinal Carafa, 1565
- Church: Catholic Church
- Archdiocese: Naples
- Appointed: 9 April 1557
- Term ended: 29 August 1565
- Predecessor: Gian Pietro Carafa
- Successor: Mario Carafa
- Other posts: Cardinal-Priest of Santi Giovanni e Paolo (1560-1565)

Orders
- Ordination: 16 April 1564
- Consecration: 30 June 1565 by Antonio Scarampi
- Created cardinal: 15 March 1557 by Pope Paul IV
- Rank: Cardinal-Priest

Personal details
- Born: 16 July 1540 Naples, Italy
- Died: 29 August 1565 (aged 25) Naples, Italy
- Coat of arms

Alfonso Carafa (16 July 1540 – 29 August 1565) was a member of one of the oldest noble families of Naples and a cardinal of the Roman Catholic Church. His father was Antonio, Marquis of Montebello, whose uncle, Gian Pietro Carafa, ascended the papal throne in 1555 as Pope Paul IV.

== Biography ==
Alfonso entered the Roman Curia in the household of Gian Pietro Carafa in 1548. His great-uncle continued to show him favour as pope, appointing him as an apostolic protonotary and insisting that the young boy sleep in his own private chambers. In March 1557 he was promoted to the cardinalate and a few weeks later made archbishop of Naples. After the disgrace of his uncles Carlo and Giovanni in January 1559, Alfonso assumed the role of Cardinal Nephew for the last few months of Paul's pontificate.

In June 1560 he was arrested on the instructions of the new pope Pius IV and along with his two uncles was imprisoned in the Castel Sant'Angelo on charges of corruption and the theft of papal property. However, receiving considerably more sympathy than his despised uncles, Alfonso was spared the execution that was their fate. In April 1561 he was released and in 1562 returned to his archdiocese.

He died of a fever on 29 August 1565 aged only twenty-five years.
