= Niccolò Pandolfini =

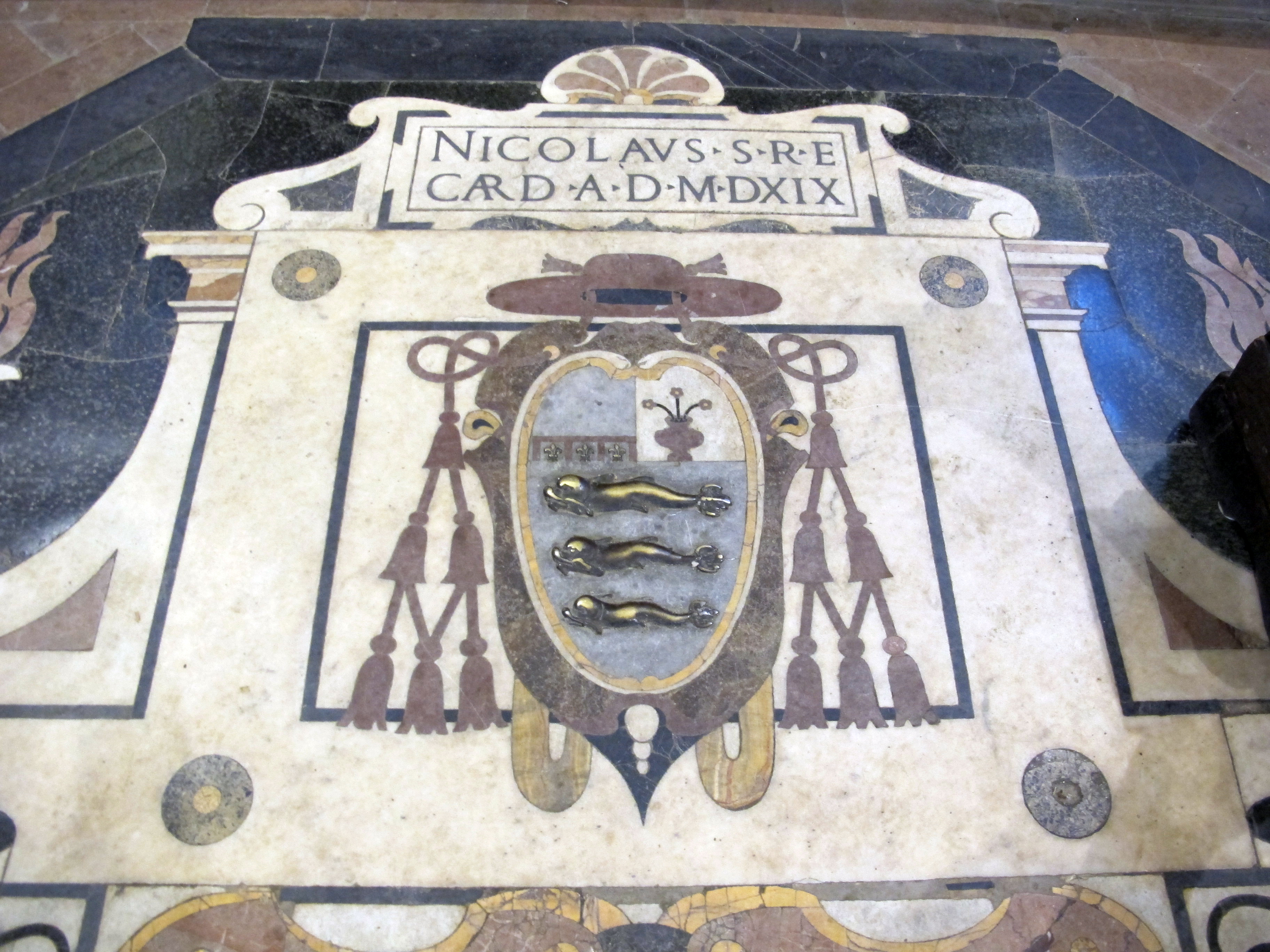
Pandolfini's tomb on the floor 08, niccolò pandolfini.JPG

Niccolò Pandolfini (1440–1518) was an Italian Roman Catholic bishop and cardinal.

== Biography ==
Niccolò Pandolfini was born in Florence in 1440, the son of Giannozzo Pandolfini and Giovanna Valori, who were Florentine patricians.

He studied at the University of Bologna. In 1461, he became a canon of the cathedral chapter of Florence Cathedral.

Moving to Rome, he was a cleric in the Apostolic Camera from 1462 to 1474. He was a papal scribe during the pontificate of Pope Paul II. Pope Sixtus IV made Pandolfini preceptor of piety and letters for the pope's nephew, Giuliano della Rovere, who later became Pope Julius II.

On December 23, 1474, he was elected Bishop of Pistoia. Under Pope Sixtus IV, he was governor of Benevento; Pope Innocent VIII later confirmed him in this position. He was named sollicitaoris of apostolic letters on May 21, 1513. Pope Julius II made him an auditor and ascribed him to the papal family.

Pope Leo X made him a cardinal priest in the consistory of July 1, 1517. He received the red hat and the titular church of San Cesareo in Palatio on July 6, 1517.

He died in Pistoia on September 17, 1518. He is buried in the Badia Fiorentina.
