= Michele Zezza =

Catholic patriarch and archbishop

Patriarch Michele Zezza
- Archbishop of Naples
- Church: Catholic Church
- Archdiocese: Archdiocese of Naples
- In office: 4 April 1923 – 20 December 1923
- Predecessor: Giuseppe Antonio Ermenegildo Prisco
- Successor: Alessio Ascalesi
- Other post: Titular Patriarch of Constantinople (1923-1927)
- Previous posts: Titular Archbishop of Ancyra (1919-1923); Coadjutor Archbishop of Naples (1919-1923); Bishop of Pozzuoli (1893-1919); Titular Bishop of Calydon (1891-1893); Auxiliary Bishop of Naples (1891-1893)

Orders
- Ordination: 21 September 1872
- Consecration: 21 June 1891 by Raffaele Monaco La Valletta

Personal details
- Born: 7 April 1850 Naples, Kingdom of the Two Sicilies
- Died: 26 June 1927 (aged 77)

Michele Zezza (Naples, 7 April 1850 – 26 June 1927) was a Roman Catholic patriarch and Catholic Archbishop of Naples, Italy.

== Biography ==
Michele Zezza of the Barons of Zapponeta was born in Naples on 7 April 1850 and was ordained a priest on 21 September 1872.

On 1 June 1891 he was appointed auxiliary bishop of Naples and bishop of Calidone. He received the episcopal consecration on 21 June that year.

On 12 June 1893 he was appointed bishop of Pozzuoli. In 1896 he established, at the church of San Raffaele di Pozzuoli, the diocesan center of the apostolate of prayer and the watchdog association in honor of the Sacred Heart of Jesus.

On 3 July 1919 he was promoted to Archbishop Coadjutor, with the right of succession, of Naples and archbishop of Ancira. He was Archbishop of Naples from 4 April 1923 to 20 December 1923, the day of nomination to Patriarch of Constantinople.

He died on 26 June 1927.

== See also ==
- Catholic Church in Italy
