= San Cesareo de Appia =

- San Cesareo in Palatio
- Chiesa di San Cesareo de Appia
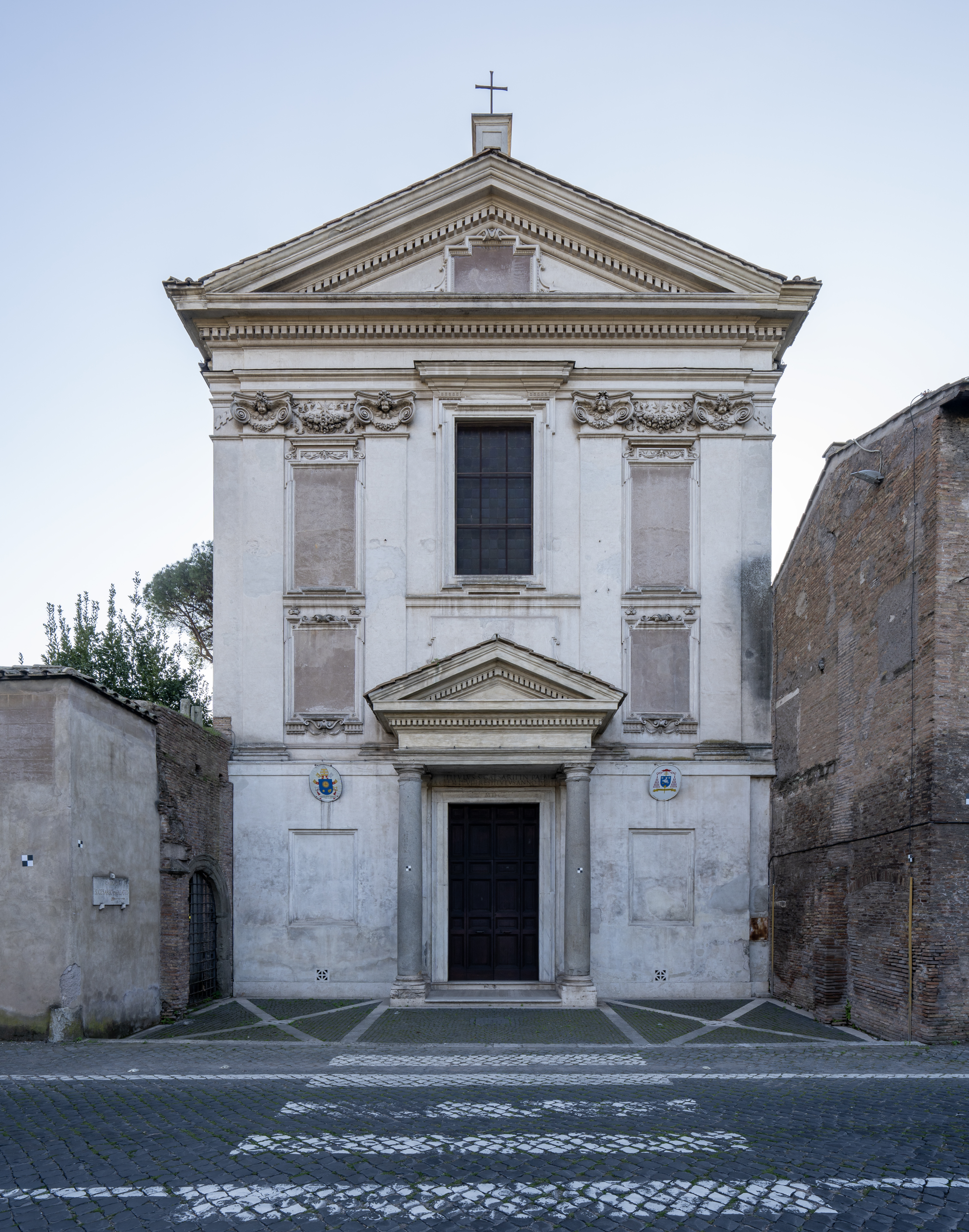
- Façade
- Click on the map for a fullscreen view.
- 41°52′43.24″N 12°29′49.62″E
- Location: Via di Porta San Sebastiano 2, Rome
- Country: Italy
- Language: Italian
- Denomination: Catholic
- Tradition: Roman Rite

History
- Founder: Valentinian I
- Dedication: Caesarius of Terracina

Architecture
- Functional status: titular church
- Style: Baroque
- Groundbreaking: 8th century
- Completed: 17th century

Administration
- Diocese: Rome

San Cesareo in Palatio or San Caesareo de Appia (Italian: [san tʃeˈzaːreo de ˈappja]) is a titular church in Rome dedicated to Saint Caesarius of Terracina, a 2nd-century deacon and martyr. It is located near Casina del Cardinal Bessarione on Via di Porta San Sebastiano and the beginning of the Appian Way. The present church was constructed in the early 17th century, but the church could trace its origin to the 4th century.

== History ==
=== Origins ===
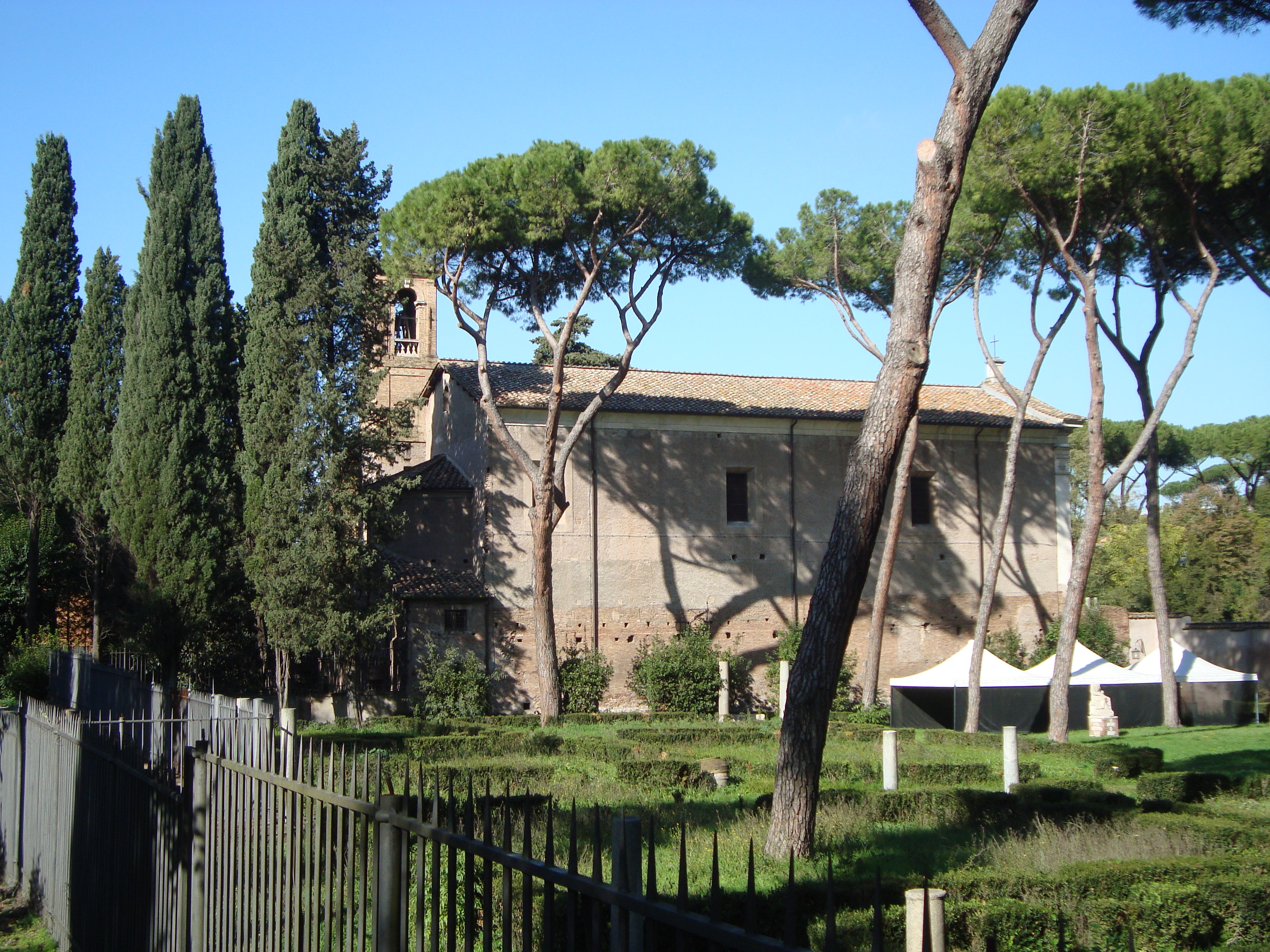
Side view

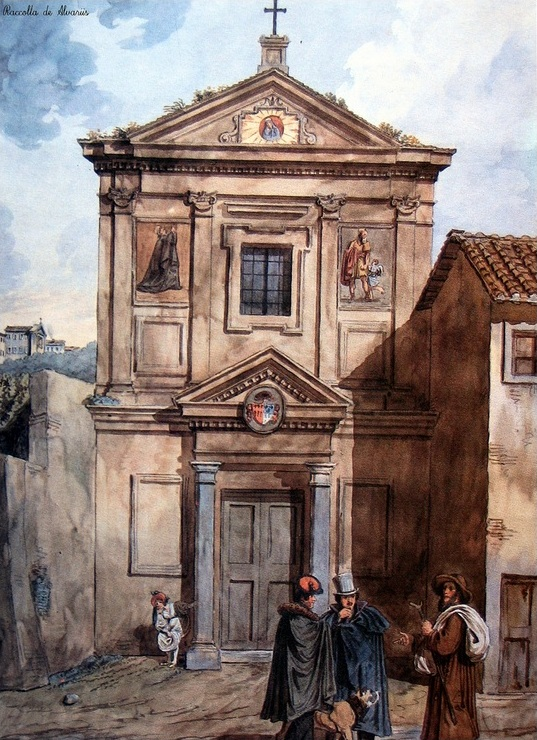
Painting by Achille Pinelli (c. 1826–35)

In the 4th century, Emperor Valentinian I's daughter was cured at the shrine of Caesarius at Terracina, the site of his martyrdom. The emperor (who reigned in AD 364–375) then decided to move his relics to Rome. They were taken to a church on the Palatine Hill, and when they were later moved to a new church, that church got the name "in Palatio", "at the Palace". It is also known as San Cesareo de Appia.

Excavations have revealed a Roman bath on the site from the 2nd or 3rd century, with a huge black and white mosaic depicting Neptune and marine creatures, along with foundations of what is thought to be the first church here, built in the 8th century.

=== Medieval ===
No written evidence exists for the church's origins; it is first mentioned in the written sources in 1192. In the Middle Ages, the church was part of a hospice and hospital for pilgrims, and had a column in front of it to demonstrate this.

=== 17th century ===
The present church is the result of reconstruction work undertaken in 1602/3, supervised by the great historian Cardinal Cesare Baronio, who was then titular here and whose house survives. The coat-of-arms of the reigning Pope Clement VIII, who was of the Aldobrandini family, was added to the coffered ceiling. The central panel of the latter depicts St. Caesarius. Though they have now been lost to pollution, at this same period frescoes were added to the facade, which is the work of Giacomo della Porta. The Cosmatesque pulpit, the balustrades, the altar frontal and episcopal chair behind the altar (in pale blue, unusual in Cosmatesque work) may have been brought here at this time from San Giovanni in Laterano, when work was undertaken at this period in the transepts there, although possibly they came from other churches. The paintings between the windows are also 17th century, by Cavalier D'Arpino and Cesare Rosetti, and depict the martyrdoms of St. Caesarius and of several saints named Hippolytus, a compliment to Pope Clement VIII, whose baptismal name was Ippolito. It was Cavalier D'Arpino who also produced the design for the rare motif in the mosaic, God the Father.

=== 20th century ===
Another restoration occurred in the years 1955 to 1963.

John Paul II was the titular cardinal of this church.

== List of Cardinal Deacons ==
- Niccolò Pandolfini pro hac vice(6 July 1517 – 17 September 1518)
- Louis de Gorrevod pro hac vice (16 May 1530 – 22 April 1535)
- Bartolomeo Guidiccioni pro hac vice (28 January 1540 – 24 September 1543)
- Cristoforo Madruzzo pro hac vice (9 January 1545 – 16 January 1560)
- Pier Francesco Ferrero pro hac vice (3 June 1561 – 10 November 1561)
- Archangelo de' Bianchi pro hac vice (3 July 1570 – 18 January 1580)
- Silvestro Aldobrandini (5 November 1603 – 28 January 1612)
- Carlo Gaudenzio Madruzzo pro hac vice (1616 – 2 March 1623)
- Gian Giacomo Teodoro Trivulzio (17 December 1629 – 17 October 1644)
- Carlo Rossetti (28 November 1644 – 18 August 1653)
- Friedrich von Hessen-Darmstadt (30 March 1661 – 14 November 1667)
- Carlo Barberini (18 August 1653 – 30 August 1660; 14 November 1667 – 2 December 1675)
- Girolamo Casanate (2 December 1675 – 6 April 1682)
- Benedetto Pamphili (30 April 1685 – 30 September 1686)
- Giovanni Francesco Negroni (30 September 1686 – 2 January 1696)
- Giambattista Spinola (iuniore) pro hac vice (2 January 1696 – 19 March 1719)
- Thomas Philip Wallrad d’Hénin-Liétard d'Alsace-Boussu de Chimay pro hac vice (16 June 1721 – 2 December 1733)
- Giovanni Battista Spinola (2 December 1733 – 23 September 1743)
- Gian Francesco Albani (15 May 1747 – 12 February 1759)
- Giovanni Costanzio Caracciolo (19 November 1759 – 12 December 1770)
- Bernardino de' Vecchi (29 May 1775 – 24 December 1775)
- Giovanni Cornaro (20 July 1778 – 29 March 1789)
- Filippo Campanelli (26 September 1791 – 18 February 1795)
- Giuseppe Albani (29 October 1804 – 2 October 1818)
- Tommaso Bernetti (25 June 1827 – 22 January 1844)
- Giuseppe Bofondi (14 June 1847 – 2 December 1867)
- vacant (1867-1884)
- Ignazio Masotti (13 November 1884 – 31 October 1888)
- Achille Apolloni (27 May 1889 – 3 April 1893)
- Giuseppe Antonio Ermenegildo Prisco (3 December 1896 – 24 March 1898)
- Willem Marinus van Rossum (30 November 1911 – 6 December 1915)
- Franziskus Ehrle (14 December 1922 – 31 March 1934)
- Domenico Mariani (19 December 1935 – 23 April 1939)
- Francesco Bracci (18 December 1958 – 24 March 1967)
- Karol Jozef Wojtyła pro hac vice (29 June 1967 – 16 October 1978) (later Pope John Paul II)
- Andrzej Maria Deskur pro hac vice (25 May 1985 – 3 September 2011)
- Antonio Maria Vegliò pro hac vice (18 February 2012 – )
