= Santa Maria Avvocata =

Italian Catholic church

- Chiesa di Santa Maria Avvocata (Italian)
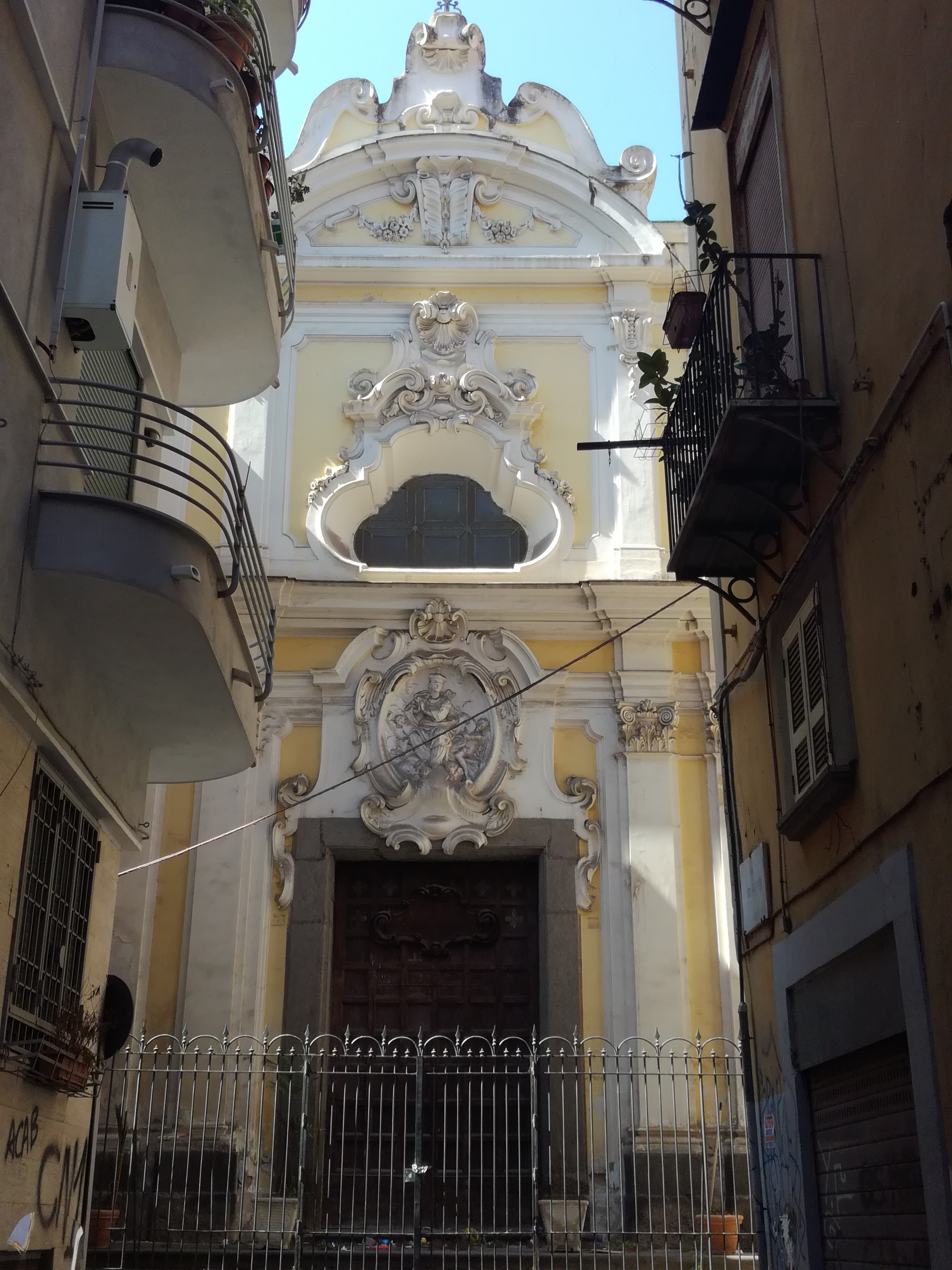
- Santa Maria Avvocata
- 40°51′1.08″N 14°14′55.03″E
- Location: Naples, Campania
- Country: Italy
- Denomination: Roman Catholic

History
- Founded: 16th century

Architecture
- Style: Baroque

Administration
- Archdiocese: Archdiocese of Naples

Santa Maria Avvocata is a Catholic church located at the end of Via Avvocata in Piazza Dante in the Historic Center of Naples, Italy.

== History ==
The church building dates back to the 16th century, when the Carmelite priest Alessandro Mollo built a church with a small convent. By the end of the century, Cardinal Alfonso Gesualdo, the Archbishop of Naples, had purchased the complex and raised it to the status of a parish church.

In the subsequent centuries, the church was remodeled in the Baroque style common to many of the churches in Naples. The facade was re-designed by Domenico Antonio Vaccaro with stucco.

The center of the parish was then moved from Santa Maria Avvocata to the nearby Church of San Domenico Soriano.

The nave is bright and full of decorations and festoons. Its plan is rectangular and the high altar is made of multicolored marble. The design of the interior is similar to that of the nearby Church of Sant'Antonio a Tarsia. Several frescoes inside are by Luca Giordano and Vincenzo Galloppi.

On the left side of the facade is a door that leads to the quarters of the Confraternity of the Blessed Sacrament of Avvocata, where there are frescoes by Andrea dell'Asta and Francesco Solimena.

== See also ==
- Churches in Naples
- Roman Catholic Archdiocese of Naples
