= Innocenzo Ferrieri =

Italian cardinal

His Eminence Innocenzo Ferrieri
- Prefect Emeritus of the Congregation of Bishops and Regulars
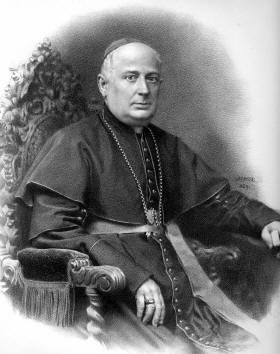
- Church: Roman Catholic Church
- Appointed: 1878
- Term ended: 12 August 1886
- Predecessor: Giuseppe Andrea Bizzarri
- Successor: Ignazio Masotti
- Other post: Cardinal-Priest of Santa Cecilia (1868-87)
- Previous posts: Ecclesiastical Superior of Batavia (1841-47); Titular Archbishop of Side (1847-68); Apostolic Nuncio to Portugal (1856-68); Prefect of the Congregation of Indulgences and Sacred Relics (1875-76); Pro-Prefect of the Congregation of Bishops and Regulars (1876-78); Camerlengo of the College of Cardinals (1877-79)

Orders
- Ordination: 20 September 1834
- Consecration: 10 October 1847 by Pope Pius IX
- Created cardinal: 13 March 1868 by Pope Pius IX
- Rank: Cardinal-Priest

Personal details
- Born: Innocenzo Ferrieri; 13 September 1810 Fano, Papal States
- Died: 13 January 1887 (aged 76) Rome, Kingdom of Italy
- Buried: Campo Verano
- Education: University of Macerata
- Coat of arms: Innocenzo Ferrieri's coat of arms

Innocenzo Ferrieri (1810–1887) was an Italian cardinal of the Roman Catholic Church. Ferrieri was appointed Titular Archbishop of Side on 4 October 1847 and sent by Pope Pius IX as his ambassador to the Sublime Porte in Istanbul. He was elevated to Cardinal on 13 March 1868 by Pius IX and appointed Cardinal-Priest of the Church of Santa Cecilia on 24 September 1868.
