= Vincenzo Costaguti =

Catholic cardinal

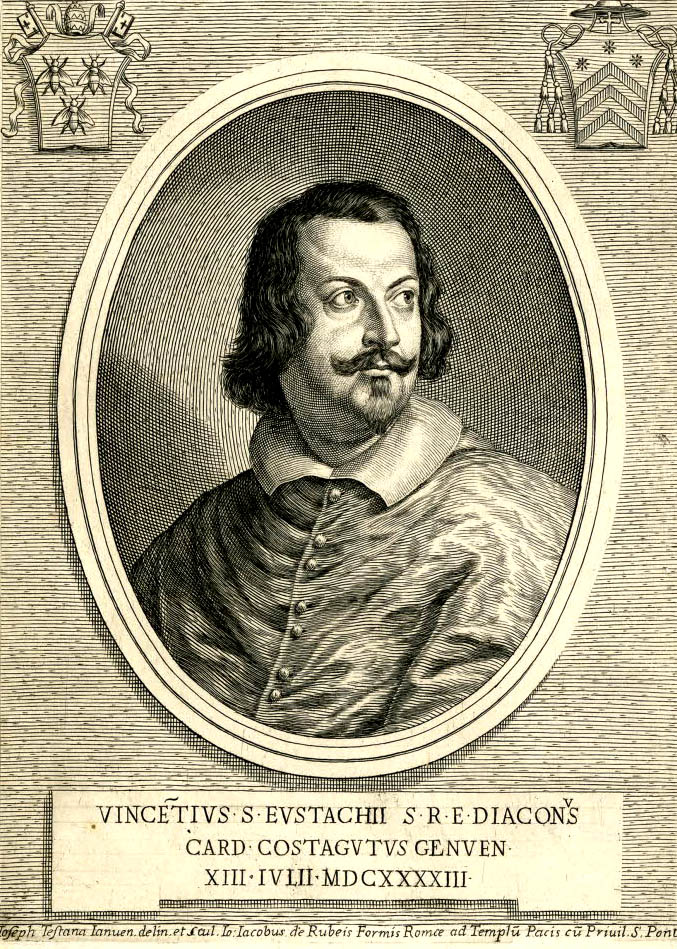
Vincenzo Costaguti

Vincenzo Costaguti (1612 – 6 December 1660) was an Italian Catholic Cardinal.

== Early life ==
Costaguti was born in 1612, in Rome to the Costaguti; Genoese nobility. He was the son of Prospero Costaguti (Marquis of Sipicciano and of Rocca Elvezia) and his first wife Paola Costa. The Costaguti family were responsible for commissioning the Palazzo Costaguti in rione Sant'Angelo, Rome which includes artistic works by Domenichino, Lanfranco and Badalocchio. His younger half-brother, Giambattista Costaguti, also later became a cardinal.

At the age of 20, he went into the service of the Church and was appointed a protonotary apostolic participantium and later was appointed as a regent of the Apostolic Chancery under Vice-Chancellor Cardinal Francesco Barberini. Thereafter, he was appointed Commissary General of Umbria and Marca before obtaining a doctorate utroque iure in 1638, which qualified him to be appointed referendary of the Tribunals of the Apostolic Signatura of Justice and of Grace.

For a brief period in 1643, he was appointed Vice-legate of Ferrara.

== Cardinalate ==
At only 31, Costaguti was elevated to Cardinal in 1643 and was installed as Cardinal-Deacon at the Church of Santa Maria in Portico Octaviae. When Pope Urban VIII died the following year he participated in the Papal conclave of 1644, which elected Pope Innocent X.

He was regularly in the company of Pope Innocent and contemporary, John Bargrave, suggested he was also popular among the College of Cardinals and the people of Rome because of his good humour and generosity.

Pope Innocent made him Legate in Urbino from 1648 to 1651, after which he opted for the title of Cardinal-Deacon of Sant'Angelo in Pescheria in 1652.

== Later years ==
He participated in the conclave of 1655, which elected Pope Alexander VII and under his pontificate became Cardinal-Deacon of Santa Maria in Cosmedin, Cardinal-Deacon of Sant'Eustachio (1656) and finally Cardinal-Deacon of San Callisto, where he remained for only 6 months before his death.

In early December 1660, he developed an acute fever and did not recover. He died on 6 December 1660, at age 48.
