= Michele de Jorio =

Italian jurist (1738–1806)

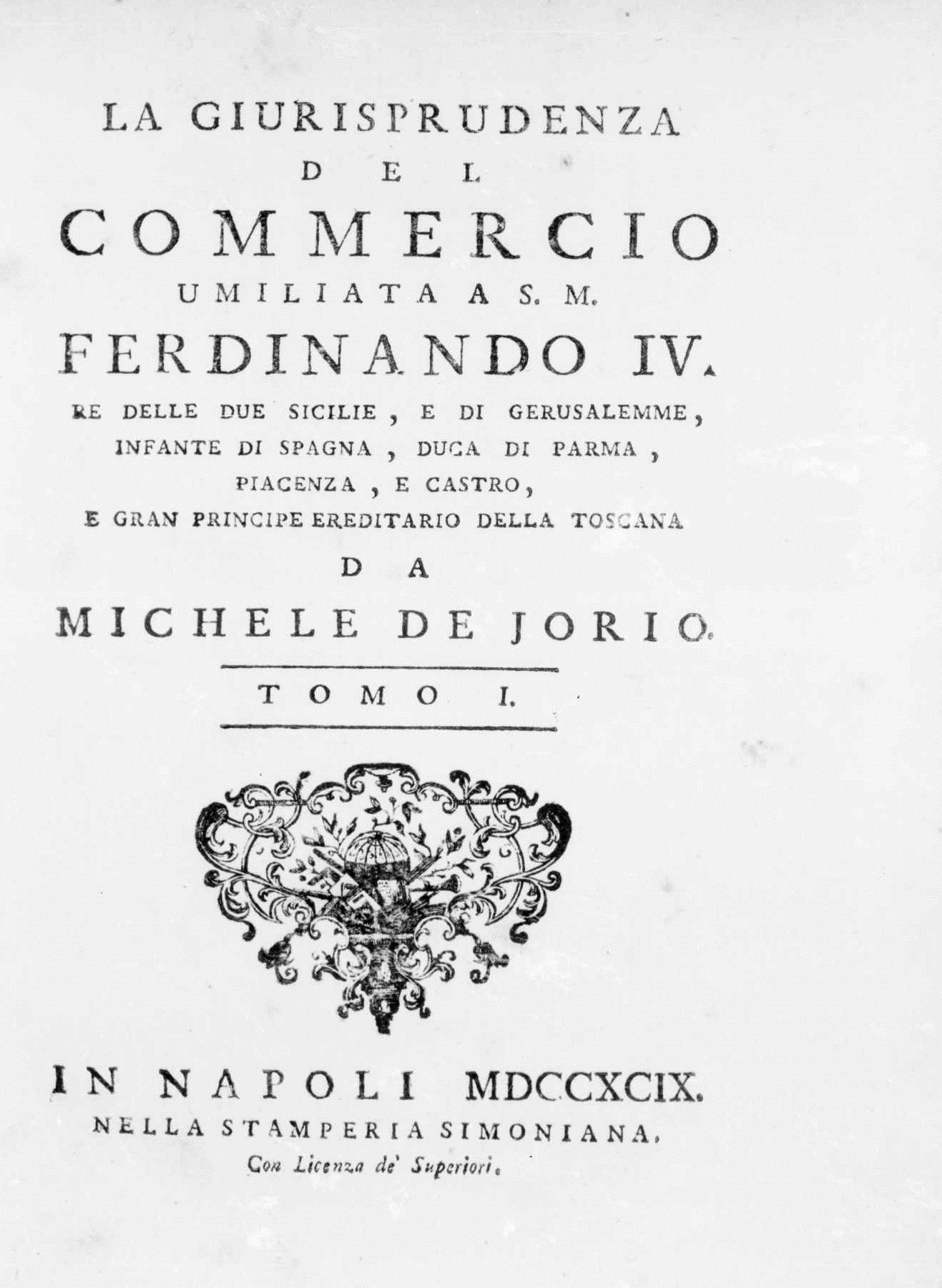
Title page of the first volume of La giurisprudenza del commercio (1799)

Michele de Jorio (Procida, 18 October 1738 – Procida, 13 February 1806) was an Italian jurist, lawyer, and magistrate. He was from the Kingdom of Naples.

From 1798, de Jorio also became a university professor of commercial law. In 1799, he published in Naples the text of the lectures given during the first year of the course, La giurisprudenza del commercio ("The Jurisprudence of Commerce"), a substantial four-volume manual.

== Works ==
- La giurisprudenza del commercio (in Italian). Vol. 1. Naples: Di Simone. 1799.
- La giurisprudenza del commercio (in Italian). Vol. 2. Naples: Di Simone. 1799.
- La giurisprudenza del commercio (in Italian). Vol. 3. Naples: Di Simone. 1799.
- La giurisprudenza del commercio (in Italian). Vol. 4. Naples: Di Simone. 1799.
