= Rinaldo Piscicello =

Italian Roman Catholic bishop and cardinal

Rinaldo Piscicello (c1415–1457) (called the Cardinal of Naples) was an Italian Roman Catholic bishop and cardinal.

== Biography ==
Rinaldo Piscicello was born in Naples in 1415 or 1416, the son of Nicola Piscicello and Maria d'Alagni. His mother was related to Lucrezia d'Alagni, the mistress of Alfonso V of Aragon, which likely helped his career in the church.

He became a prebendary and canon of Naples Cathedral. He later became vicar general of the cathedral chapter. He also became a protonotary apostolic.

On 12 May 1451 he was elected Archbishop of Naples. He rebuilt the cathedral of San Severo, which had been badly damaged by earthquakes in December 1456.

In the consistory of 17 December 1456, Pope Callixtus III made him a cardinal. He arrived in Rome on 20 March 1457 and received the red hat, and the titular church of Santa Cecilia in Trastevere, on 21 March 1457.

He died in Rome on 4 July 1457. In 1458, his body was transferred to Naples Cathedral, where he is buried.

Catholic Church titles
Preceded by Gaspard de Diano	Archbishop of Naples; 1451 – 1457	Succeeded by Giacomo Tebaldi
