= Ignazio Masotti =

His Eminence Ignazio Masotti
- Prefect of the Congregation of Bishops and Regulars
- Church: Roman Catholic Church
- Appointed: 12 August 1886
- Term ended: 31 October 1888
- Predecessor: Innocenzo Ferrieri
- Successor: Isidoro Verga
- Other post: Cardinal-Deacon of San Cesareo in Palatio (1884-88)
- Previous posts: Secretary of the Congregation of Bishops and Regulars (1882-86)

Orders
- Created cardinal: 10 November 1884 by Pope Leo XIII
- Rank: Cardinal-Deacon

Personal details
- Born: Ignazio Masotti; 16 January 1817 Forlì, Papal States
- Died: 31 October 1888 (aged 71) Palazzo Altemps, Rome, Kingdom of Italy
- Buried: Campo Verano
- Education: Pontifical Roman Athenaeum Saint Apollinare

Ignazio Masotti (16 January 1817 – 31 October 1888) was an Italian cardinal.
