= Carlo Confalonieri =

Italian cardinal (1893–1986)

His Eminence Carlo Confalonieri
- Dean of the College of Cardinals
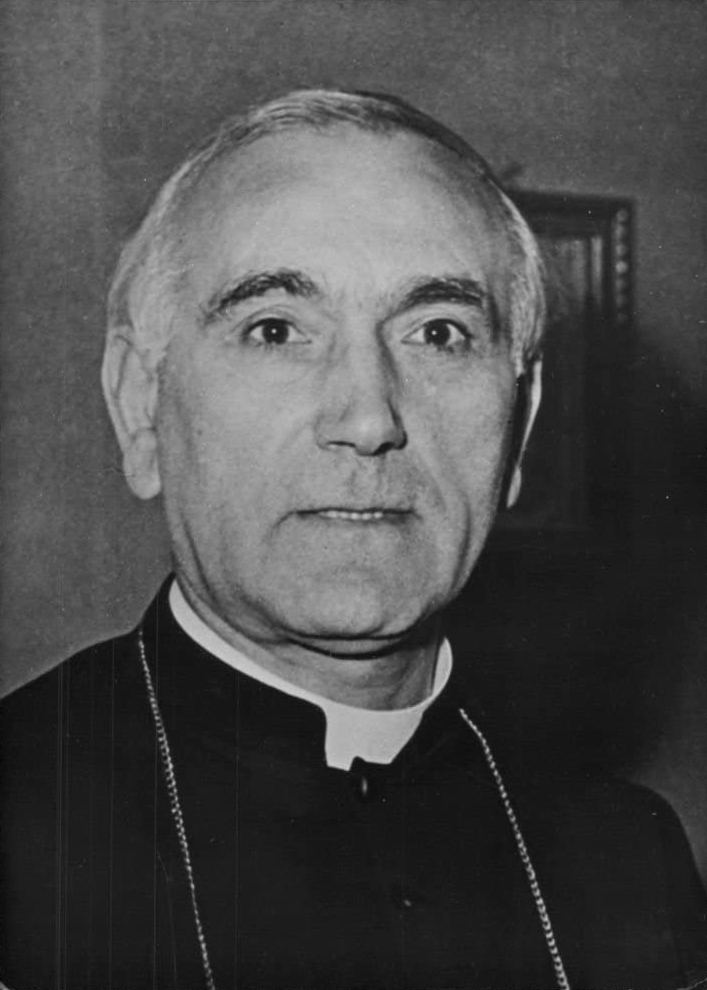
- Confalonieri in 1958
- Church: Roman Catholic Church
- Appointed: 12 December 1977
- Term ended: 1 August 1986
- Predecessor: Luigi Traglia
- Successor: Agnelo Rossi
- Other posts: Cardinal-Bishop of Palestrina (1972–1986); Cardinal-Bishop of Ostia (1977–1986)
- Previous posts: Archbishop of L'Aquila (1941–1950); Titular Archbishop of Nicopolis ad Nestum (1950–1958); Secretary of the Sacred Congregation of Seminaries and Universities (1950–1958); Cardinal-Priest of Sant'Agnese fuori le mura (1958–1972); Archpriest of the Liberian Basilica (1959–1973); President of the Pontifical Commission for Latin America (1961–1967); Secretary of the Sacred Consistorial Congregation (1961–1965); President of the Commission of Cardinals for the Pontifical Shrines of Pompeii and Loreto (1962–1969); Pro-Prefect of the Sacred Congregation for Bishops (1965–1967); Prefect of the Sacred Congregation for Bishops (1967–1973); President of the Pontifical Commission for Latin America (1969–1973); President of the Pontifical Commission for the Pastoral of Emigration and Tourism (1970–1973); Cardinal Vice-Dean of the College of Cardinals (1974–1977)

Orders
- Ordination: 18 March 1916 by Andrea Ferrari
- Consecration: 4 May 1941 by Pope Pius XII
- Created cardinal: 15 December 1958 by Pope John XXIII
- Rank: Cardinal-Priest (1958–1972); Cardinal-Bishop (1972–1986)

Personal details
- Born: Carlo Confalonieri; 25 July 1893 Seveso, Kingdom of Italy
- Died: 1 August 1986 (aged 93) Rome, Italy
- Buried: Seveso
- Denomination: Roman Catholic
- Motto: Regnum tuum Domine (Your kingdom, Lord)
- Coat of arms

Carlo Confalonieri (25 July 1893 – 1 August 1986) was an Italian cardinal of the Roman Catholic Church. He served as prefect of the Congregation for Bishops from 1967 to 1973, and dean of the College of Cardinals from 1977 until his death. Confalonieri was elevated to the cardinalate in 1958.

== Biography ==
=== Early life ===
Confalonieri was born in Seveso. His father was a cabinet-maker. Carlo was baptized by Fr. Ambrogio Sirtori the next day, on 26 July. Confirmed on 13 February 1901, Confalonieri received his first Communion on 5 May 1904. He entered the seminary in Seveso in 1904, and then archdiocesan seminary of Monza in 1909. After studying at a Milanese lyceum, he went to Rome to attend the Pontifical Seminary Ss. Ambrogio e Carlo and the Pontifical Gregorian University (from where he obtained his bachelor's degree in theology in 1913). Confalonieri then served in World War I from 1914 to 1916.

He entered the ranks of the clergy upon receiving the tonsure from Andrea Ferrari on 14 June 1912. Confalonieri was eventually ordained to the priesthood on 18 March 1916 by Cardinal Ferrari. After working in the Italian Army and Milan, he was named private secretary to Achille Ratti in 1921. Confalonieri travelled with Ratti to Rome as his attendant, or conclavist, for the 1922 papal conclave, at which the Cardinal was elected to the papacy as Pius XI. He continued to serve as Ratti's secretary until the Pope's death in 1939, and during that period he was raised to the rank of Monsignor (7 February 1922), Protonotary Apostolic (24 December 1935), and canon of St. Peter's Basilica (1935). Confalonieri was intended to be appointed Substitute, or Deputy, Secretary of State in 1937, but the position instead went to Giovanni Battista Montini. Moreover, when Pope Pius XII invited Confalonieri to become Archbishop of Modena and Abbot of Nonantola on 16 December 1939, he declined.

=== Episcopate ===
On 27 March 1941, Confalonieri was appointed Archbishop of L'Aquila by Pope Pius XII. He received his episcopal consecration on the following 4 May from Pius XII himself, with Archbishop Giuseppe Migone and Bishop Alfonso de Romanis, OSA, in the Sistine Chapel. Confalonieri became Secretary of the Sacred Congregation for Seminaries and Universities on 25 January 1950, and later Titular Archbishop of Nicopolis ad Nestum on 22 February of that same year.

Styles of Carlo Confalonieri
- Reference style: His Eminence
- Spoken style: Your Eminence
- Religious style: Cardinal deathstyle=None
- Informal style: Cardinal
- See: Palestrina (suburbicarian), Ostia (suburbicarian)

=== Cardinalate ===
Pope John XXIII created him Cardinal-Priest of S. Agnese fuori le mura in the consistory of 15 December 1958, and Confalonieri was later appointed Archpriest of the Liberian Basilica on 16 November 1959. In 1961, he was made Secretary of the Sacred Consistorial Congregation and President of the Pontifical Commission for Latin America. From 1962 to 1965, Confalonieri attended the Second Vatican Council. He was also one of the cardinal electors in the 1963 papal conclave, which selected Pope Paul VI. He later ascended to Pro-Prefect (1966) and shortly afterwards Prefect (15 August 1967) of the Consistorial, which Pope Paul renamed the Congregation for Bishops on 1 August 1967. He was also President of the Pontifical Commission for the Pastoral of Emigration and Tourism from 30 April 1970 until 25 February 1973, when he resigned all of his posts.

Confalonieri was promoted to Cardinal Bishop of Palestrina on 15 March 1972. He became Vice-Dean of the College of Cardinals on 7 January 1974, and finally its Dean on 12 December 1977. His appointment as Dean of the College of Cardinals entailed the title of the suburbicarian see of Ostia, which he took in addition to his first suburbicarian see. As Dean, he led the funeral Masses for Paul VI as well as Pope John Paul I. Confalonieri was not able to participate in the conclaves of August and October 1978 for he had exceeded the age limit of 80 to be an eligible elector. However, he was the first to suggest the name of Albino Luciani, who was elected John Paul I, during the period before the August conclave. He complimented Luciani's speech and writing, also saying "the Church has chosen well" in selecting him for the papacy.

=== Later life and death ===
He was considered a moderate in his views. At the conclave of 1963, Confalonieri was seen as a possible candidate for a transitional pope, one who is not likely to effect great change during his tenure. Yet his lack of pastoral experience was seen as a hindrance.

He died in Rome, at age 93. His funeral Mass was held in Saint Peter's Basilica three days later, on 4 August, and was presided by Pope John Paul II. After his remains were moved to his native Seveso for another funeral Mass on 5 August (presided by Giovanni Colombo), Confalonieri was buried next to his parents in their family plot at the Seveso cemetery. At the time of his death he was the oldest member of the College of Cardinals.

He was the great-uncle of Cardinal Matteo Zuppi.

== Publication ==
Confalonieri published a moving tribute to Pope Pius XI with numerous valuable anecdotes.

== Mountain climbing ==
- Like his master Pius XI, Confalonieri greatly enjoyed mountain climbing.

== Books ==
- Lentz, Harris M. (2009). Popes and Cardinals of the 20th Century: A Biographical Dictionary. Jefferson NC USA: McFarland. p. 48. ISBN 978-1-4766-2155-5.

Catholic Church titles
Preceded by Attilio Bianchi	Personal Papal Secretary; 6 February 1922 – 10 February 1939	Succeeded by Robert Leiber
Preceded by Gaudenzio Manuelli	Archbishop of L'Aquila; 27 March 1941 – 22 February 1950	Succeeded by Costantino Stella
Preceded by Marcello Mimmi	Prefect of the Congregation for Bishops; 14 March 1961 – 25 February 1973	Succeeded by Sebastiano Baggio
Preceded by Luigi Traglia	Vice-Dean of the College of Cardinals; 24 March 1972 – 7 January 1974	Succeeded by Paolo Marella
Preceded by Luigi Traglia	Dean of the College of Cardinals; 12 December 1977 – 1 August 1986	Succeeded by Agnelo Rossi
