= Naples Cathedral =

Catholic cathedral in Naples

Naples Cathedral Cathedral of the Assumption of Mary Cattedrale di Santa Maria Assunta
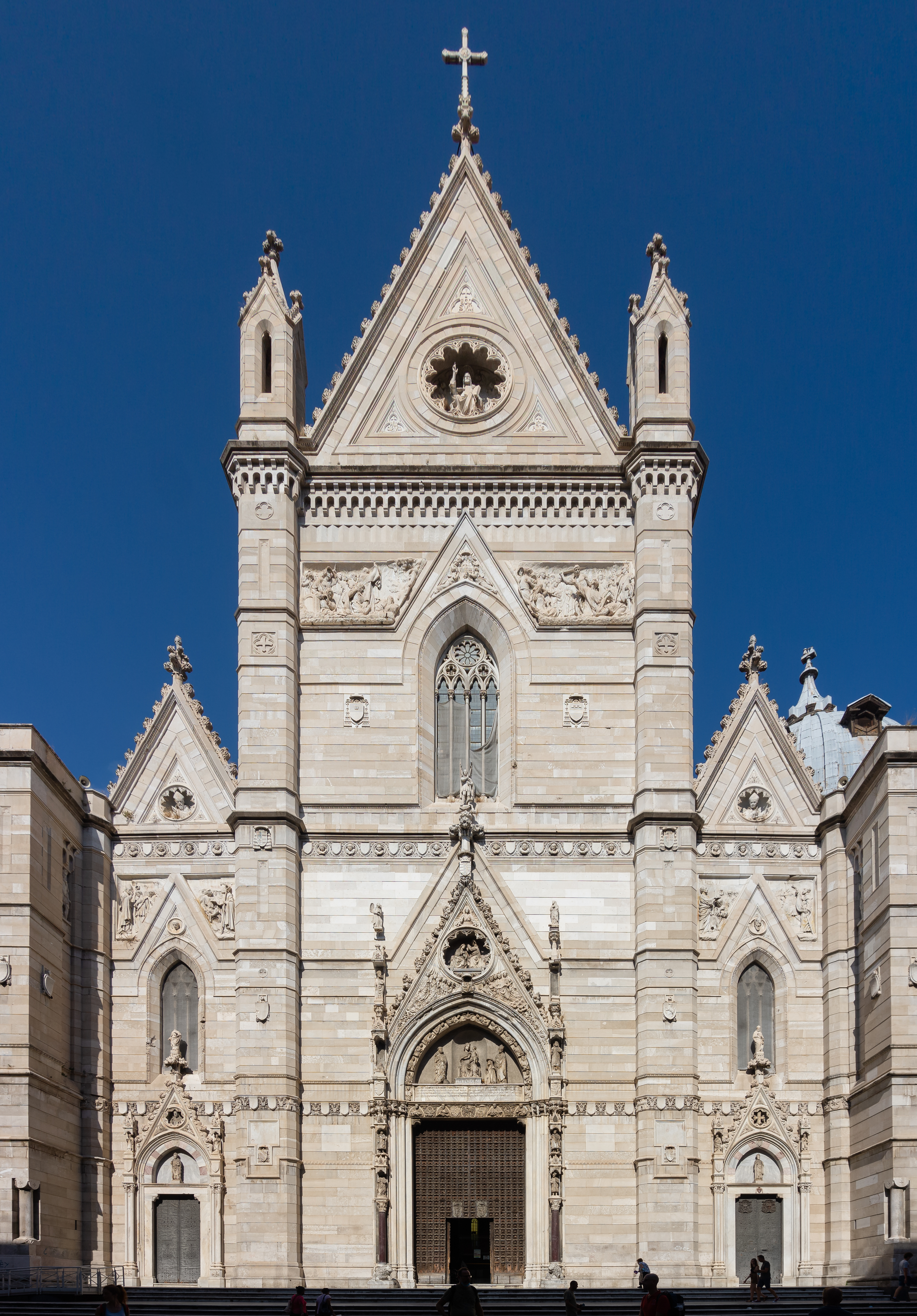
- The west front of Naples Cathedral

Religion
- Affiliation: Catholic Church
- Province: Archdiocese of Naples
- Region: Duomo
- Rite: Roman Rite
- Ecclesiastical or organisational status: Cathedral
- Year consecrated: 13th century
- Status: Active

Location
- Location: Naples, Italy
- Interactive map of Naples Cathedral; Cathedral of the Assumption of Mary; Cattedrale di Santa Maria Assunta
- Coordinates: 40.8525°N 14.2596°E

Architecture
- Type: Church
- Style: Gothic, Renaissance, Baroque, Neo-Gothic
- Groundbreaking: 13th century
- Completed: 19th century

Specifications
- Height (max): 48 m
- Dome height (inner): 40 m
- Spire height: 48 m

Naples Cathedral (Italian: Duomo di Napoli; Neapolitan: Viscuvato 'e Napule), or the Cathedral of the Assumption of Mary (Italian: Cattedrale di Santa Maria Assunta), is a Roman Catholic cathedral, the main church of Naples, southern Italy, and the seat of the Archbishop of Naples. It is widely known as the Cathedral of Saint Januarius (Cattedrale di San Gennaro), in honour of the city's patron saint.

== History ==
The present cathedral in Angevin Gothic style (Italian: gotico angioino) was commissioned by King Charles I of Anjou. Construction continued during the reign of his successor, Charles II (1285–1309) and was completed in the early 14th century under Robert of Anjou. It was built on the foundations of two palaeo-Christian basilicas, whose traces can still be clearly seen. Underneath the building excavations have revealed Greek and Roman artifacts.

The Archbishop's Palace adjoins the cathedral.

== Interior and artwork ==
The cathedral gives access to the archaeological remains in the crypt of the neighbouring original palaeochristian church of Santa Restituta where there is a Greek wall belonging to the temple of Apollo, in opus reticulatum. Under the apse the peristyle of a late imperial domus can be seen; also a stretch of Roman aqueduct after the foundation of the city and a stretch of Greek road on an inclined plane.

Another attraction of the interior is the Royal Chapel of the Treasure of San Gennaro, with frescoes by Domenichino and Giovanni Lanfranco, altarpieces by Domenichino, Massimo Stanzione and Jusepe Ribera, the rich high altar by Francesco Solimena, the bronze railing by Cosimo Fanzago and other artworks, including a reliquary by French masters of the 14th century.

Other artworks include an Assumption by Pietro Perugino, canvasses by Luca Giordano and the palaeo-Christian baptistery, with mosaics from the 4th century. The main chapel is a restoration of the 18th century, with a Baroque relief by Pietro Bracci. The Minutolo Chapel, mentioned in Boccaccio's Decameron, has 14th-century frescoes.

The crypt is by the Lombard Tommaso Malvito. The façade was reworked by Enrico Alvino in the late 19th century, but retains the 15th century portal, including some sculptures by Tino da Camaino.

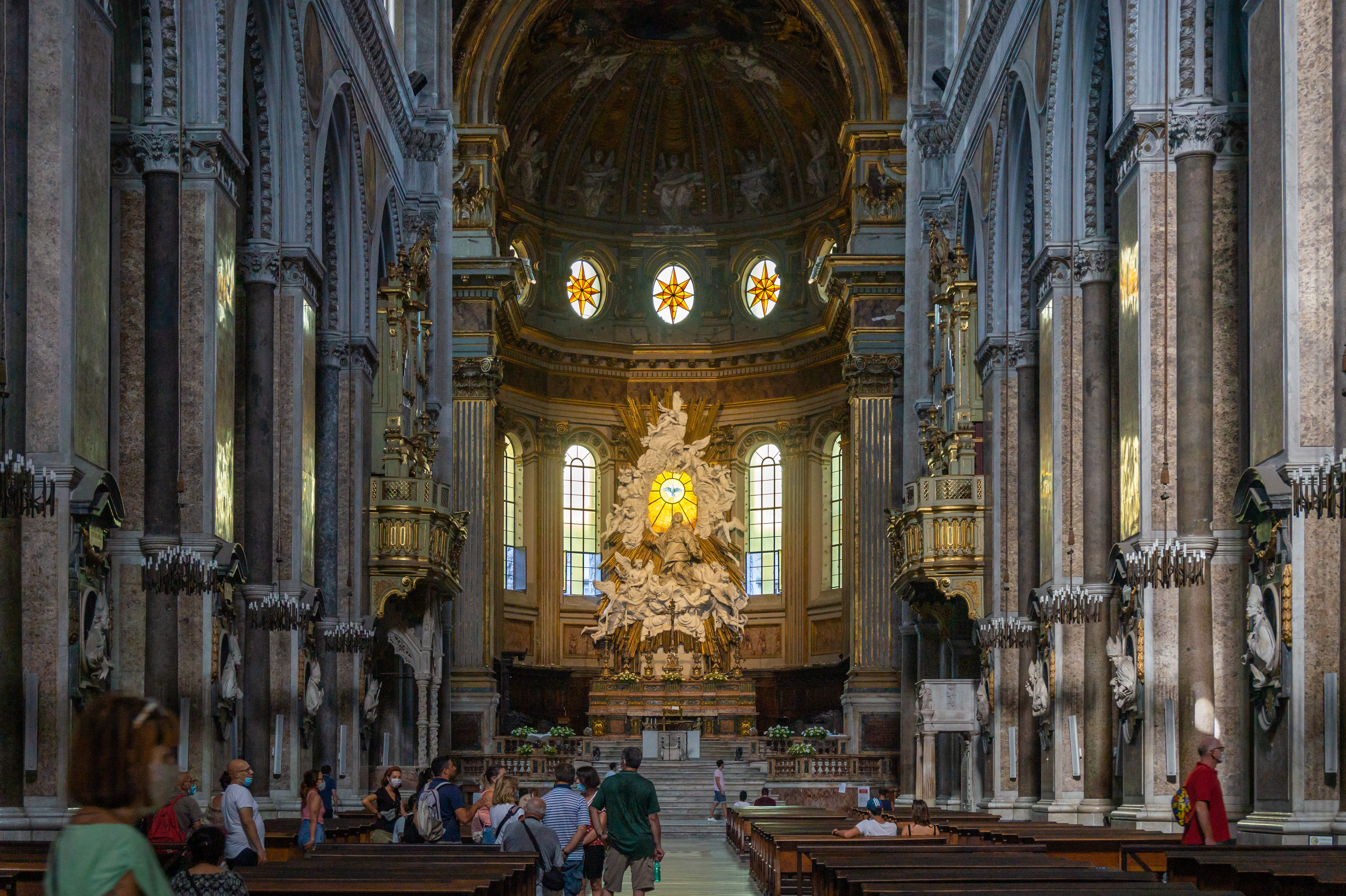
View of the interior, towards the apse

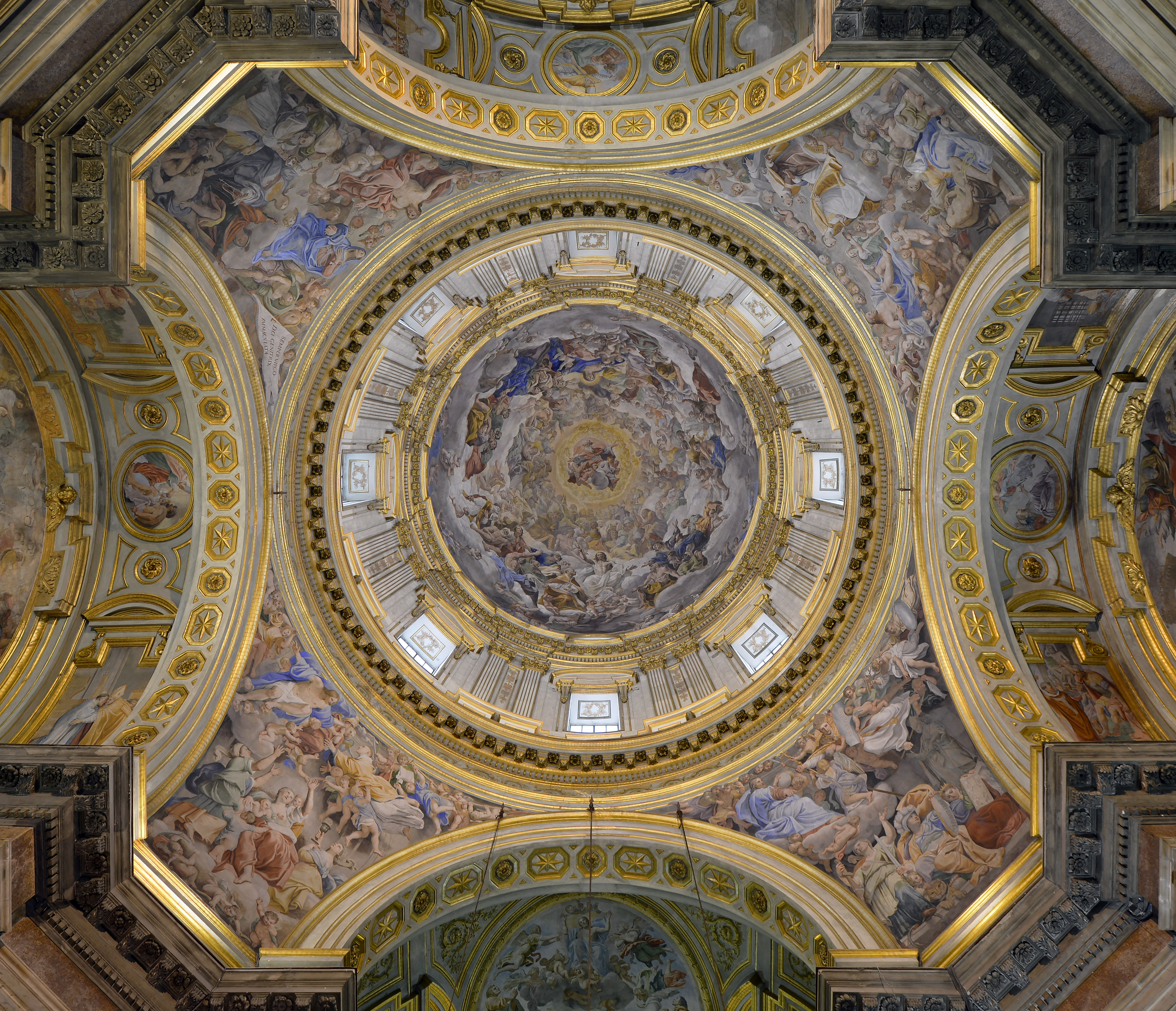
Dome of the Royal Chapel of the Treasure of St. Januarius

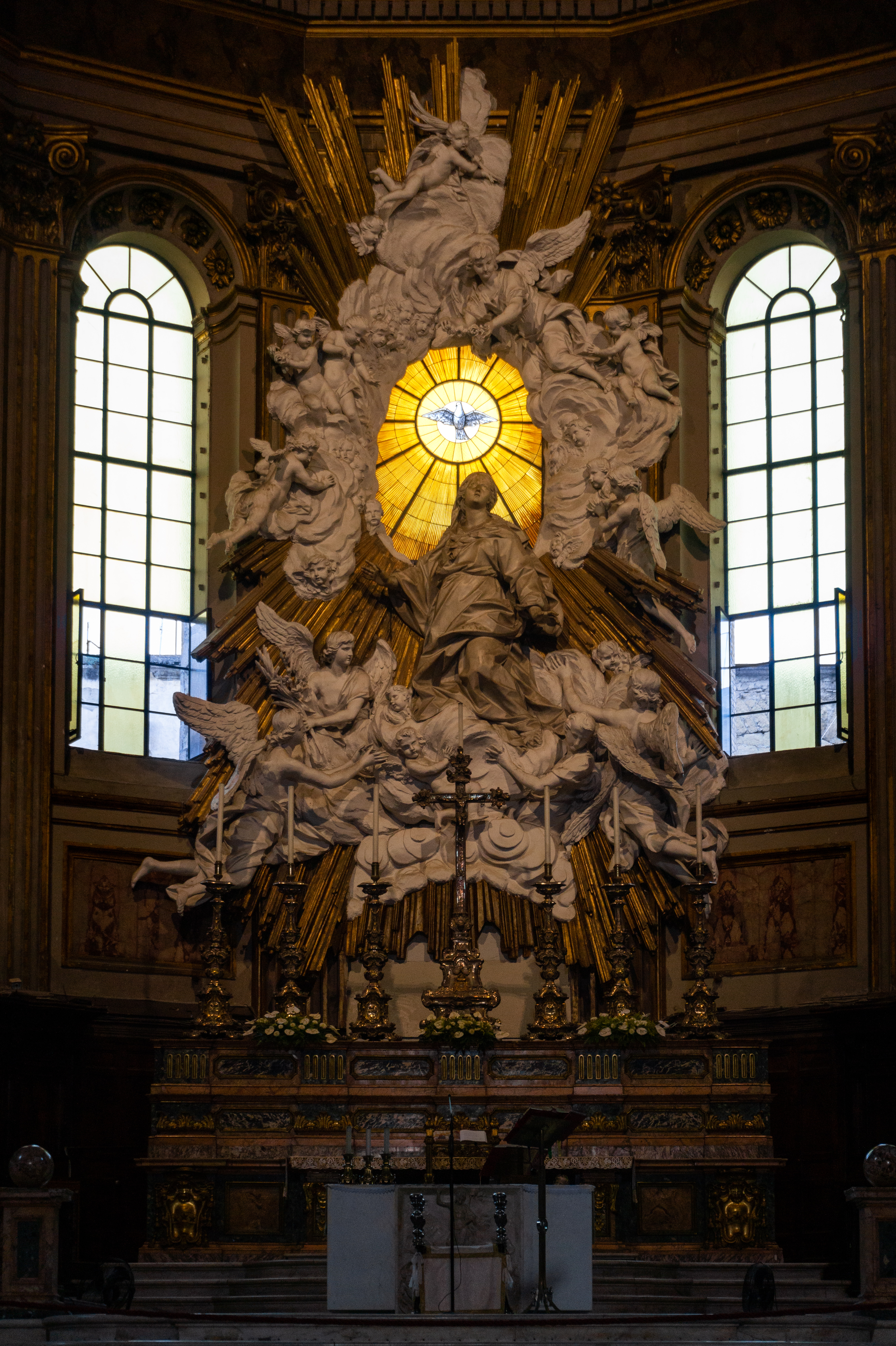
Detail of the apse

== Miracle of the Blood ==
The church houses a vial of the blood of Saint Januarius, which is brought out three times a year, on the first Saturday in May, on 19 September and 16 December, when the dried blood usually liquefies. If the blood fails to liquefy, then legend has it that disaster will befall Naples.

A recent hypothesis by Garlaschelli, Ramaccini, and Della Sala is that the vial contains a thixotropic gel, he also explained on the Blood Miracle of Riddles of the Dead series on National Geographic Channel. In such a substance viscosity increases if left unstirred and decreases if stirred or moved. Researchers have proposed specifically a suspension of hydrated iron oxide, FeO(OH), which reproduces the color and behavior of the 'blood' in the ampoule. The suspension can be prepared from simple chemicals that would have been easily available locally since antiquity. On March 21, 2015, the blood in the vial appeared to liquefy during a visit by Pope Francis. This was taken as a sign of the saint's favour of the pope. The blood did not liquefy when Pope Benedict XVI visited in 2007.

== Burials ==
- Saint Januarius
- Pope Innocent IV
- Charles I of Naples
- Saint Restituta
- Sisto Riario Sforza
- Rinaldo Piscicello
- Ascanio Filomarino
- Alfonso Castaldo
