= Alessio Ascalesi =

Catholic cardinal (1872 – 1952)

His Eminence Alessio Ascalesi C.PP.S.
- Cardinal, Archbishop of Naples
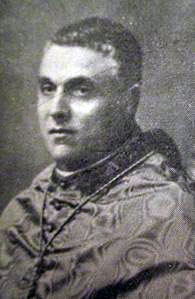
- Church: Roman Catholic Church
- Archdiocese: Naples
- See: Naples
- Appointed: 7 March 1924
- Term ended: 11 May 1952
- Predecessor: Michele Zezza di Zapponeta
- Successor: Marcello Mimmi
- Other posts: Cardinal-Priest of San Callisto (1916–52); Cardinal Protopriest (1944–52)
- Previous posts: Bishop of Muro Lucano (1909–11); Bishop of Sant'Agata de' Goti (1911–15); Archbishop of Benevento (1915–24)

Orders
- Ordination: 8 June 1895
- Consecration: 8 August 1909 by Domenico Serafini
- Created cardinal: 4 December 1916 by Pope Benedict XV
- Rank: Cardinal-Priest

Personal details
- Born: Alessio Ascalesi; 22 October 1872 Afragola, Kingdom of Italy
- Died: 11 May 1952 (aged 79) Naples, Italy
- Motto: Ut ad Deum ascendam
- Coat of arms

Alessio Ascalesi (22 October 1872 – 11 May 1952) was an Italian Cardinal of the Roman Catholic Church and Archbishop of Naples.

== Biography ==
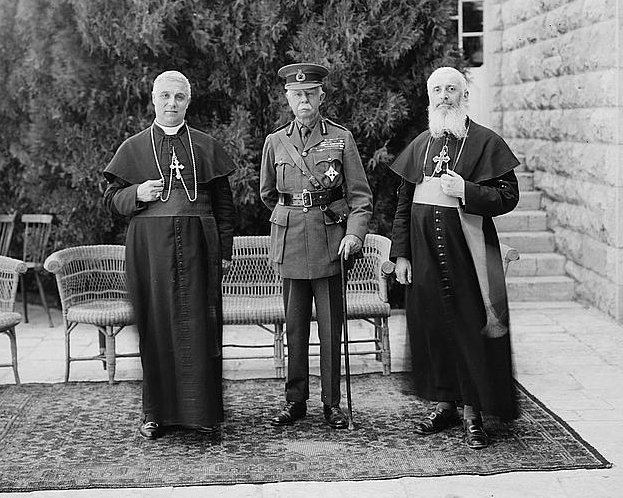
Ascalesi (left) with Lord Plumer, High Commissioner of Palestine, and Luigi Barlassina, Latin Patriarch of Jerusalem, in 1926

Ascalesi was born in Casalnuovo, near Naples. He joined the priesthood and entered the Seminary of Spoleto. He was ordained on 8 June 1895. He joined the Congregation of the Most Precious Blood. He worked as a priest in the diocese of Spoleto from 1895 until 1909, doing pastoral work.

Pope Pius X appointed him Bishop of Muro Lucano on 29 April 1909. Ascalesi was transferred to see of Sant'Agata dei Goti on 19 June 1911, and was promoted to the metropolitan see of Benevento in 1915.

He was created and proclaimed Cardinal-Priest of San Callisto by Pope Benedict XV in the consistory of 4 December 1916. He participated in the conclave of 1922 that elected Pope Pius XI. Pope Pius transferred him to the metropolitan see of Naples on 7 March 1924. As Archbishop, he declared the 1925 Amalfi earthquake an expression of God's wrath for short skirts in current women's fashion. He also participated in the conclave of 1939 that elected Pope Pius XII. At that conclave, he was considered one of the nine leading candidates for pope.

He died at Naples on May 11, 1952, following a long illness.

Catholic Church titles
Preceded by Michele Zezza	Archbishop of Naples; 7 March 1924 – 11 May 1952	Succeeded by Marcello Mimmi
