= Giuseppe Antonio Ermenegildo Prisco =

Italian cardinal (1833–1923)

His Eminence Giuseppe Antonio Ermenegildo Prisco
- Cardinal, Archbishop of Naples
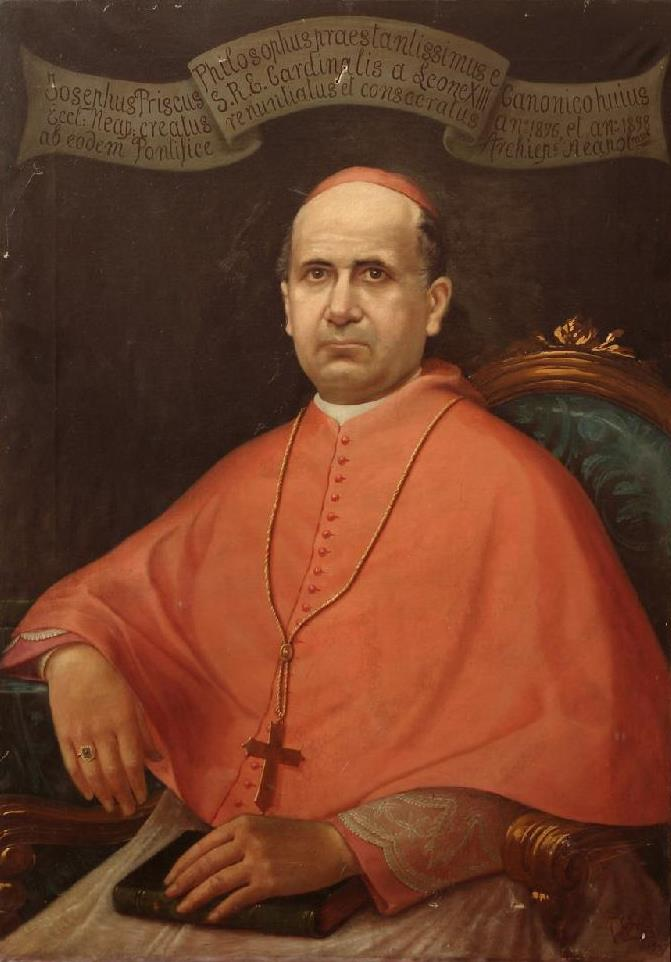
- Giuseppe Antonio Ermenegildo Prisco
- Church: Roman Catholic Church
- Archdiocese: Naples
- See: Naples
- Appointed: 24 March 1898
- Term ended: 4 February 1923
- Predecessor: Vincenzo Maria Sarnelli
- Successor: Michele Zezza di Zapponeta
- Other post: Cardinal-priest of San Sisto (1898-1923)
- Previous post: Cardinal-deacon of San Cesareo in Palatio (1896-98)

Orders
- Ordination: 20 September 1856
- Consecration: 29 May 1898 by Pope Leo XIII
- Created cardinal: 30 November 1896 by Pope Leo XIII
- Rank: Cardinal-deacon (1896-98); Cardinal-priest (1898-1923)

Personal details
- Born: Giuseppe Antonio Ermenegildo Prisco; 8 September 1833 Boscotrecase, Naples, Kingdom of the Two Sicilies
- Died: 4 February 1923 (aged 89) Naples, Kingdom of Italy
- Coat of arms

Styles of Giuseppe Prisco
- Reference style: His Eminence
- Spoken style: Your Eminence
- Informal style: Cardinal
- See: Naples

Giuseppe Antonio Ermenegildo Prisco (8 September 1833 – 4 February 1923) was an Italian cardinal of the Roman Catholic Church who was Archbishop of Naples.

== Biography ==
Prisco was born in Boscotrecase, near Naples. He was educated at the Archiepiscopal Seminary of Naples.

He was ordained to the priesthood in September 1856 with an indult because he had not yet reached the canonical age for the appointment. He was professor of philosophy at the seminary, where he himself was taught. He was later served as a professor of rational law at Ospizio Ecclesiastico di Maria, Naples. One of his students was Benedetto Croce. He was also prefect of studies at the Archiepiscopal Seminary of Naples and examiner of the clergy. He was a representative of Archbishop Guglielmo Sanfelice d'Acquavilla to the Società Cattoliche Operaie.

He was a follower of the neo-Thomist movement.

He was created cardinal deacon of S. Cesareo in Palatio by Pope Leo XIII. He was named in the consistory of 30 November 1896, receiving his red biretta on 3 December. He opted for the order of cardinal priests and title of San Sisto on 24 March 1898.

He was appointed as Archbishop of Naples on 24 March 1898 and was consecrated on 29 May 1898 in the Sistine Chapel by Pope Leo XIII. He participated in the conclave of 1903 that elected Pope Pius X. He did not participate in the conclaves of 1914 and 1922 because of poor health. He died on 4 February 1923 of pulmonary disease in Naples, at the age of 89.

Catholic Church titles
Preceded by Guglielmo Sanfelice d'Acquavilla	Archbishop of Naples; 24 March 1898 – 4 February 1923	Succeeded by Michele Zezza di Zapponeta
Records
Preceded by François de Cabrières	Eldest living Member of the Sacred College; 21 December 1921 - 4 February 1923	Succeeded by Vincenzo Vannutelli
