= Archdiocese of Naples =

Roman Catholic archdiocese in Italy

Coordinates: 40°51′09″N 14°15′34″E

Archdiocese of Naples Archidioecesis Neapolitana Arcidiocesi di Napoli Arcidiocesi 'e Napule

Catholic
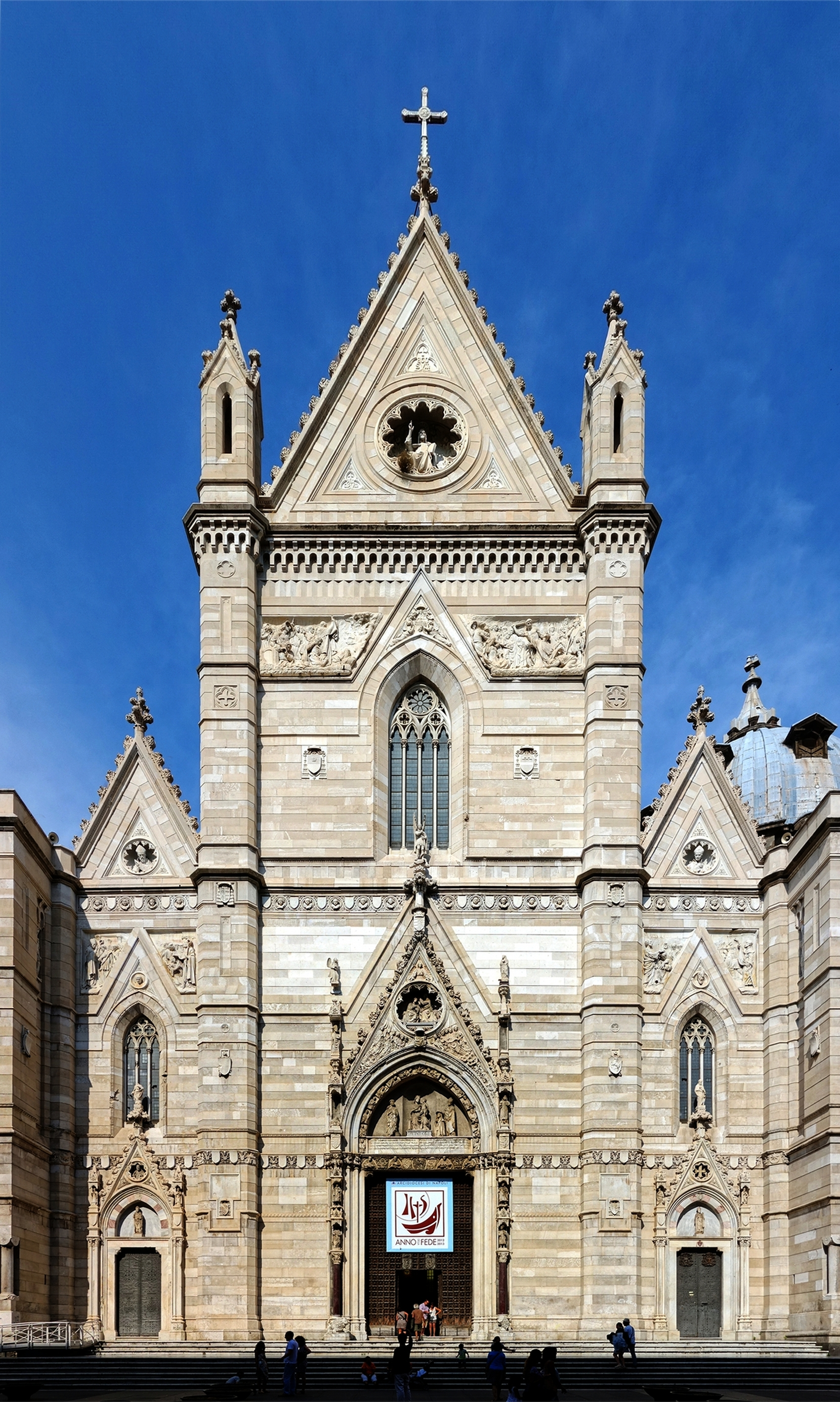
- Naples Cathedral

Location
- Country: Italy
- Ecclesiastical province: Naples

Statistics
- Area: 274 km^{2} (106 sq mi)
- Population: Total; Catholics: (as of 2013); 1,744,000; 1,715,000 (98.3%)
- Parishes: 287

Information
- Denomination: Catholic Church
- Rite: Roman Rite
- Established: 1st Century
- Cathedral: Cattedrale di Maria SS. Assunta
- Patron saint: Aspren; Januarius

Current leadership
- Pope: Leo XIV
- Archbishop: Domenico Battaglia
- Auxiliary Bishops: Francesco Beneduce, S.J., Michele Autuoro, Gaetano Castello
- Bishops emeritus: Crescenzio Sepe

The Archdiocese of Naples (Italian: Arcidiocesi di Napoli; Neapolitan: Arcidiocesi 'e Napule); Latin: Archidioecesis Neapolitana) is a Latin archdiocese of the Catholic Church in southern Italy, the see being in Naples. A Christian community was founded there in the 1st century AD and the diocese of Naples was raised to the level of an Archdiocese in the 10th century. Two Archbishops of Naples have been elected Pope, Paul IV and Innocent XII.

In 2004 it counted c. 1,600,000 baptized people.

The current ordinary of the Archdiocese of Naples is Cardinal Crescenzio Sepe. Lucio Lemmo and Gennaro Acampa are auxiliary bishops.

In the foreword to the Summa Theologica, the famous theological summary of the Catholic Church's doctrines, where a biography of the author, Saint Thomas Aquinas, is found, it is mentioned that he was offered the post of Archbishop of Naples (in the 1200s), which even then was one of the most prominent archdioceses, but turned it down.

== Bishops ==
- Cardinal Enrico Minutoli (1389–1400 Resigned)
- Cardinal Giordano Orsini (iuniore) (1400–1405 Appointed, Cardinal-Priest of Santi Silvestro e Martino ai Monti)

...

- Gaspard de Diano (1438–1451 Died)
- Cardinal Rinaldo Piscicello (1451–1457 Died)
- Cardinal Giacomo Tebaldi (1458–1458 Resigned)
- Cardinal Oliviero Carafa (1458–1484 Resigned)
- Alessandro Carafa (1484–1503 Died)
- Cardinal Oliviero Carafa (1503–1505 Resigned)
- Cardinal Gianvincenzo Carafa (1505–1530 Resigned)
- Francesco Carafa (1530–1544 Died)
- Cardinal Ranuccio Farnese, O.S.Io.Hieros. (1544–1549 Resigned)
- Cardinal Gian Pietro Carafa (1549–1555 Elected, Pope)
- Cardinal Alfonso Carafa (1557–1565 Died)
- Mario Carafa (1565–1576 Died)
- Cardinal (Bl.) Paul Burali d'Arezzo, C.R. (1576–1578 Died)
- Annibale de Capua (1578–1595 Died)
- Cardinal Alfonso Gesualdo di Conza (Gonza) (1596–1603 Died)

- Curtio Palumbo (1604–1605), vicar general

- Cardinal Ottavio Acquaviva d'Aragona (seniore) (1605–1612 Died)
- Decio Carafa (1613–1626 Died)
- Cardinal Francesco Boncompagni (1626–1641 Died)
- Cardinal Ascanio Filomarino (1641–1666 Died)
- Cardinal Innico Caracciolo (seniore) (1667–1685 Died)
- Cardinal Antonio Pignatelli del Rastrello (1686–1691 Elected Pope Innocent XII)
- Cardinal Giacomo Cantelmo (1691–1702 Died)
- Giambattista Patrizi (1702–1703 Resigned)
- Cardinal Francesco Pignatelli (seniore), C.R. (1703–1734 Died)
- Cardinal Giuseppe Spinelli (1734–1754 Resigned)
- Antonino Sersale (1754–1775 Died)
- Serafino Filangeri (Filangieri), O.S.B. (1776–1782 Died)
- Cardinal Giuseppe Maria Capece Zurlo, C.R. (1782–1801 Died)
- Giovanni Vincenzo Monforte (1802–1802 Died)
- Cardinal Luigi Ruffo Scilla (1802–1832 Died)
- Cardinal Filippo Giudice Caracciolo, C.O. (1833–1844 Died)
- Cardinal Sisto Riario Sforza (1845–1877 Died)
- Cardinal Guglielmo Sanfelice D'Acquavella, O.S.B. (1878–1897 Died)
- Cardinal Vincenzo Maria Sarnelli (1897–1898 Died)
- Cardinal Giuseppe Antonio Ermenegildo Prisco (1898–1923 Died)
- Michele Zezza (1923–1923 Retired)
- Cardinal Alessio Ascalesi, C.Pp.S. (1924–1952 Died)
- Cardinal Marcello Mimmi (1952–1958 Appointed, Cardinal-Bishop of Sabina e Poggio Mirteto)
- Cardinal Alfonso Castaldo (1958–1966 Died)
- Cardinal Corrado Ursi (1966–1987 Retired)
- Cardinal Michele Giordano (1987–2006 Retired)
- Cardinal Crescenzio Sepe (20 May 2006–12 December 2020 Retired)
- Cardinal Domenico Battaglia (12 December 2020 Appointed-)

== Suffragan dioceses ==
- Acerra
- Alife-Caiazzo
- Aversa
- Capua
- Caserta
- Ischia
- Nola
- Pompei
- Pozzuoli
- Sessa Aurunca
- Sorrento-Castellammare di Stabia
- Teano-Calvi
