= Cardinals created by Leo XIII =

Catholic appointments from 1878 to 1903

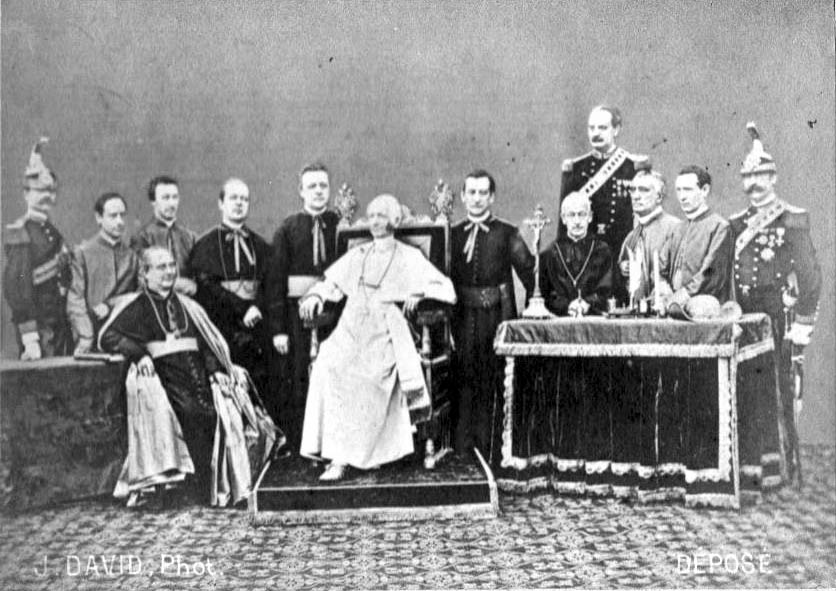
Pope Leo XIII (1810–1903) and his inner court photographed by Jules David in June 1878

Pope Leo XIII (r. 1878–1903) created 147 cardinals in 27 consistories held at roughly annual intervals. With his appointments he approached (Note: The twelve cardinals added in 1901 brought the number of cardinals to 67.) but did not exceed the limit on the size of the College of Cardinals set at 70 in 1586. The size of the college was 64 at the beginning and end of Leo XIII's 25-year papacy. (Note: Beginning with 64 at the time of the 1878 conclave, it fell to 63 upon Leo's election. He appointed 147 and 146 died, leaving 64 upon his death.) With 147 additions to a body of fewer than 70, Leo had, as one observer phrased it, "renewed the Sacred College more than twice".

The largest group of fourteen new cardinals, with two more kept secret, was announced on 16 January 1893. Nine of Leo's cardinals were created in pectore and only announced at a later consistory. Those announced at his first consistory included his brother Giuseppe Pecci. In 1893, he elevated to cardinal Giuseppe Sarto, who succeeded him as Pope Pius X in 1903. The cardinals he created included brothers Serafino and Vincenzo Vannutelli in 1887 and 1889 and cousins Luigi and Angelo Jacobini in 1879 and 1882. Another of Leo's cardinals, von Fürstenberg, had a cousin in the college appointed in 1842 by Pope Gregory XVI.

Of the 147 cardinals Pope Leo created, 85 were Italian. (Note: The 85 include Zigliara, who was born in Corsica and baptized "Francesco". The other largest national groups were 19 French and 10 Spanish.) Only three were not Europeans: Gibbons (United States), Moran (Australia), and Taschereau (Canada). Pope Leo's appointments also included the first Australian, Moran, the first Canadian, Taschereau, the first Slovenian, Missia, and the first Armenian, Hassoun, who was also the first prelate of an Oriental rite made a cardinal since 1439. Cardinals who died before visiting Rome to be assigned their titular churches included Guilbert, Lluch, and Rotelli.

Of the 147 cardinals Leo appointed, 63 survived him and 61 of them, along with one cardinal appointed earlier, (Note: Oreglia di Santo Stefano was made a cardinal in 1873 by Pope Pius IX.) participated in the 1903 conclave that elected Pius X. (Note: Two cardinals created by Leo did not participate in the 1903 conclave: Celesia was too sick to travel from Palermo and Moran unable to reach Rome from Australia in time.)

== 12 May 1879 ==
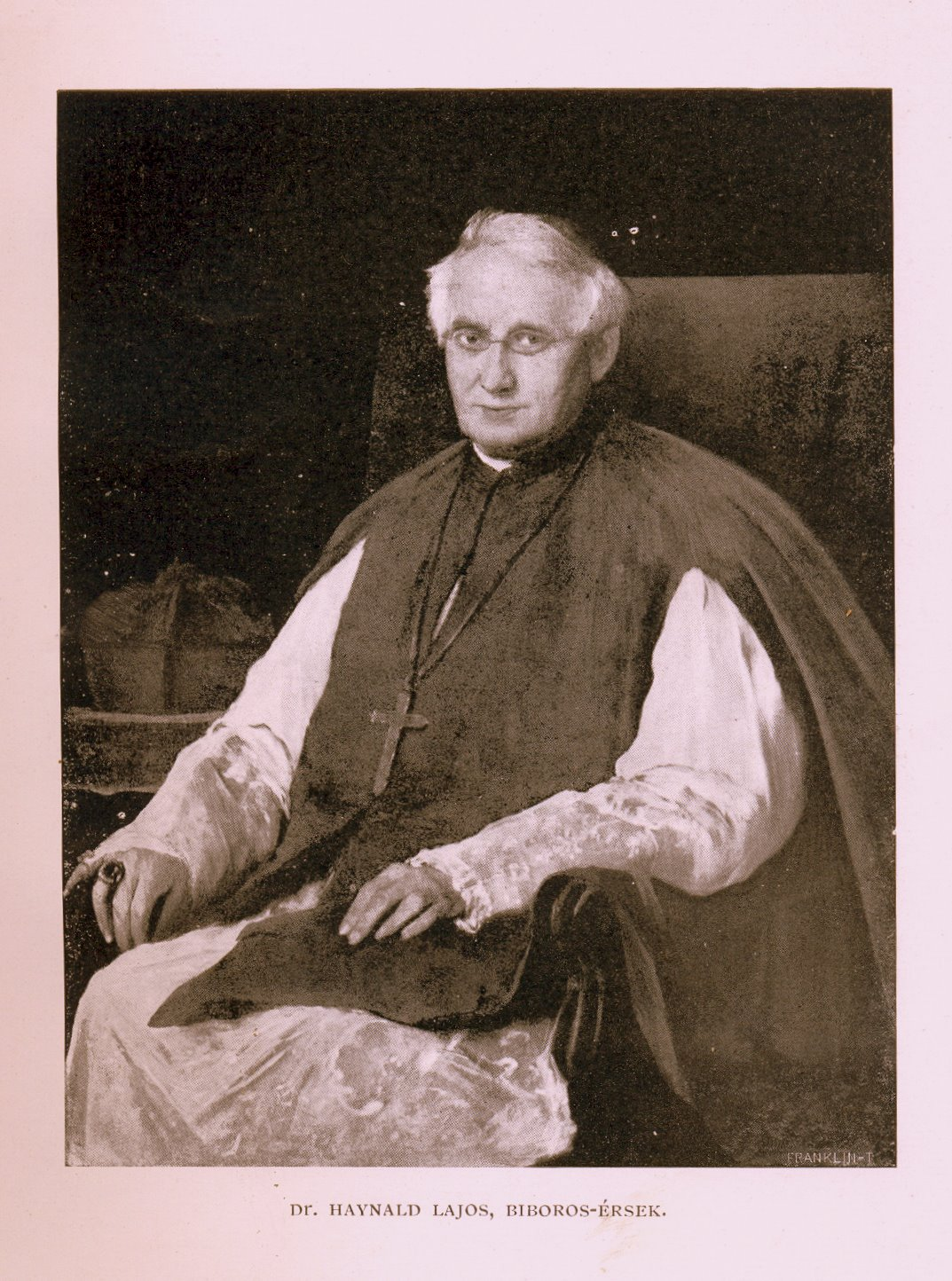
Lajos Haynald (1816–1891), made a cardinal on 12 May 1879

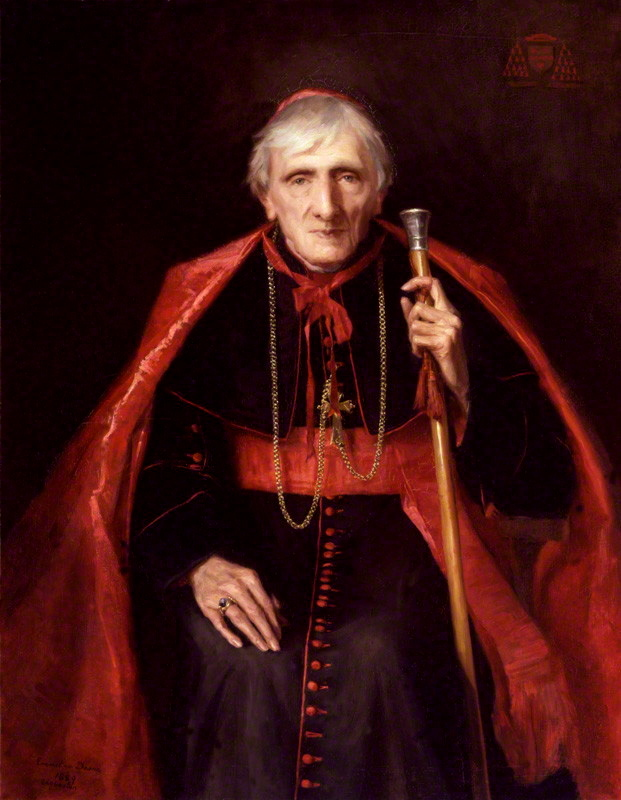
John Henry Newman (1801–1890), made a cardinal on 12 May 1879.

After waiting more than a year, on 12 May 1879, Pope Leo created cardinals for the first time, six of the order of cardinal priests and four of the order of cardinal deacons, including among the latter his brother, Giuseppe Pecci. On 22 September he gave red galeri to three of them (Desprez, Haynald, and Pie), as well as to János Simor, whom Pope Pius IX had made a cardinal in 1873. Von Fürstenberg joined his cousin Friedrich Prince zu Schwarzenberg, a cardinal since 1842.

Name	Title when named cardinal	Country
Friedrich Egon von Fürstenberg (1813–1892)	Archbishop of Olomouc	Austria-Hungary
Julien-Florian-Félix Desprez (1807–1895)	Archbishop of Toulouse	France
Lajos Haynald (1816–1891)	Archbishop of Kalocsa	Austria-Hungary
Louis-Édouard-François-Desiré Pie (1815–1880)	Bishop of Poitiers	France
Americo Ferreira dos Santos Silva (1829–1899)	Bishop of Porto	Portugal
Gaetano Alimonda (1818–1891)	Bishop of Albenga	Italy
Giuseppe Pecci (1807–1890)	Vice-librarian of the Vatican Library	Italy
John Henry Newman (1801–1890)	Founder and Provost of the Birmingham Oratory	(United Kingdom of Great Britain and Ireland) Great Britain
Joseph Hergenröther (1824–1890)	Domestic Prelate	Germany
Tommaso Maria Zigliara (1833–1893)	Rector Magnificus of College of Saint Thomas	France

== 19 September 1879 ==
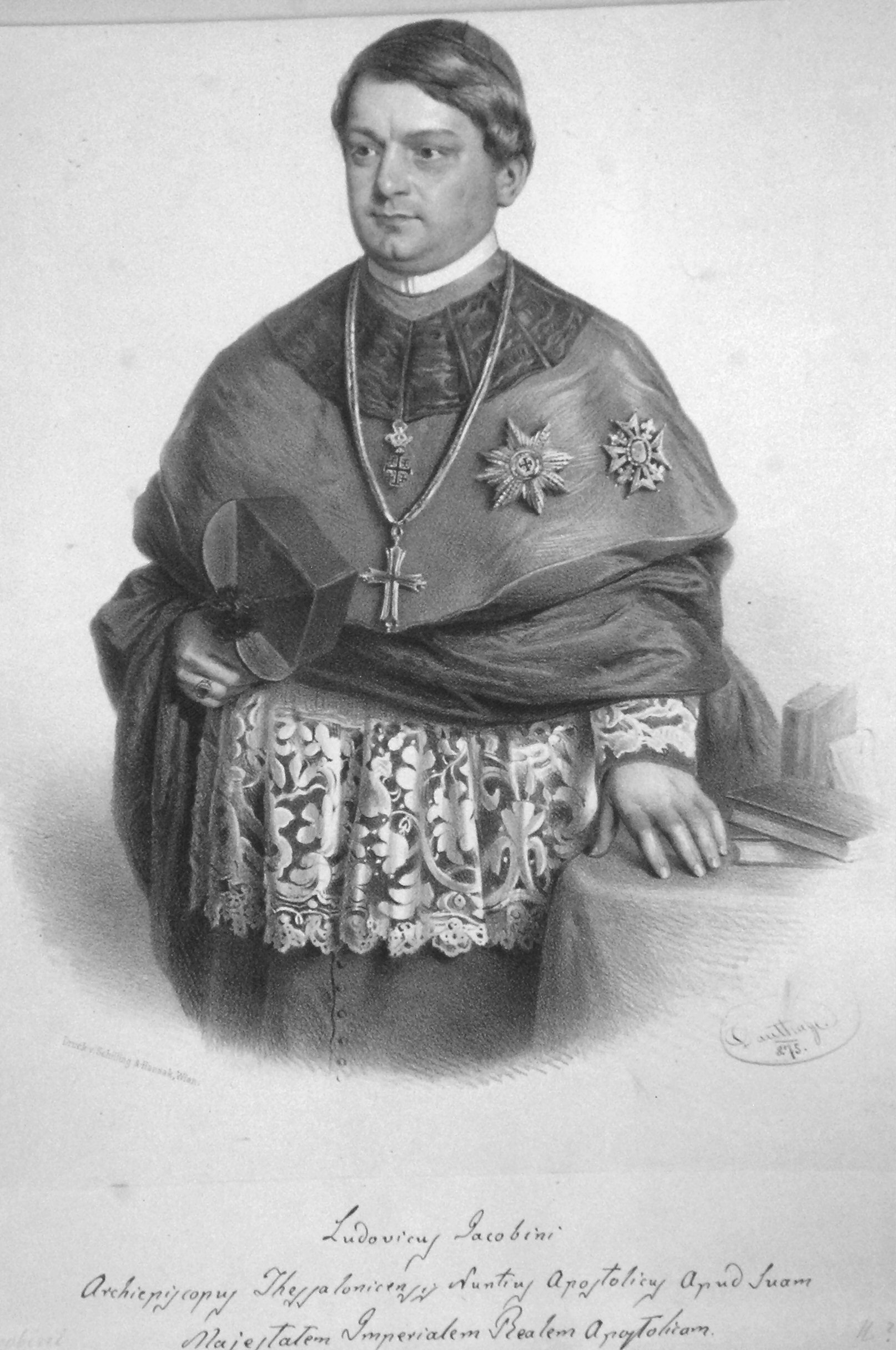
Luigi Jacobini (1832–1887), made a cardinal on 19 September 1879

Pope Leo created four cardinals on 19 September 1879.

Name	Title when named cardinal	Country
Pier Francesco Meglia (1810–1883)	Apostolic Nuncio to France	Italy
Giacomo Cattani (1823–1887)	Secretary of the Sacred Congregation of the Council	Italy
Luigi Jacobini (1832–1887)	Apostolic Nuncio to Austria-Hungary	Italy
Domenico Sanguigni (1809–1882)	Apostolic Nuncio to Portugal	Italy

== 13 December 1880 ==
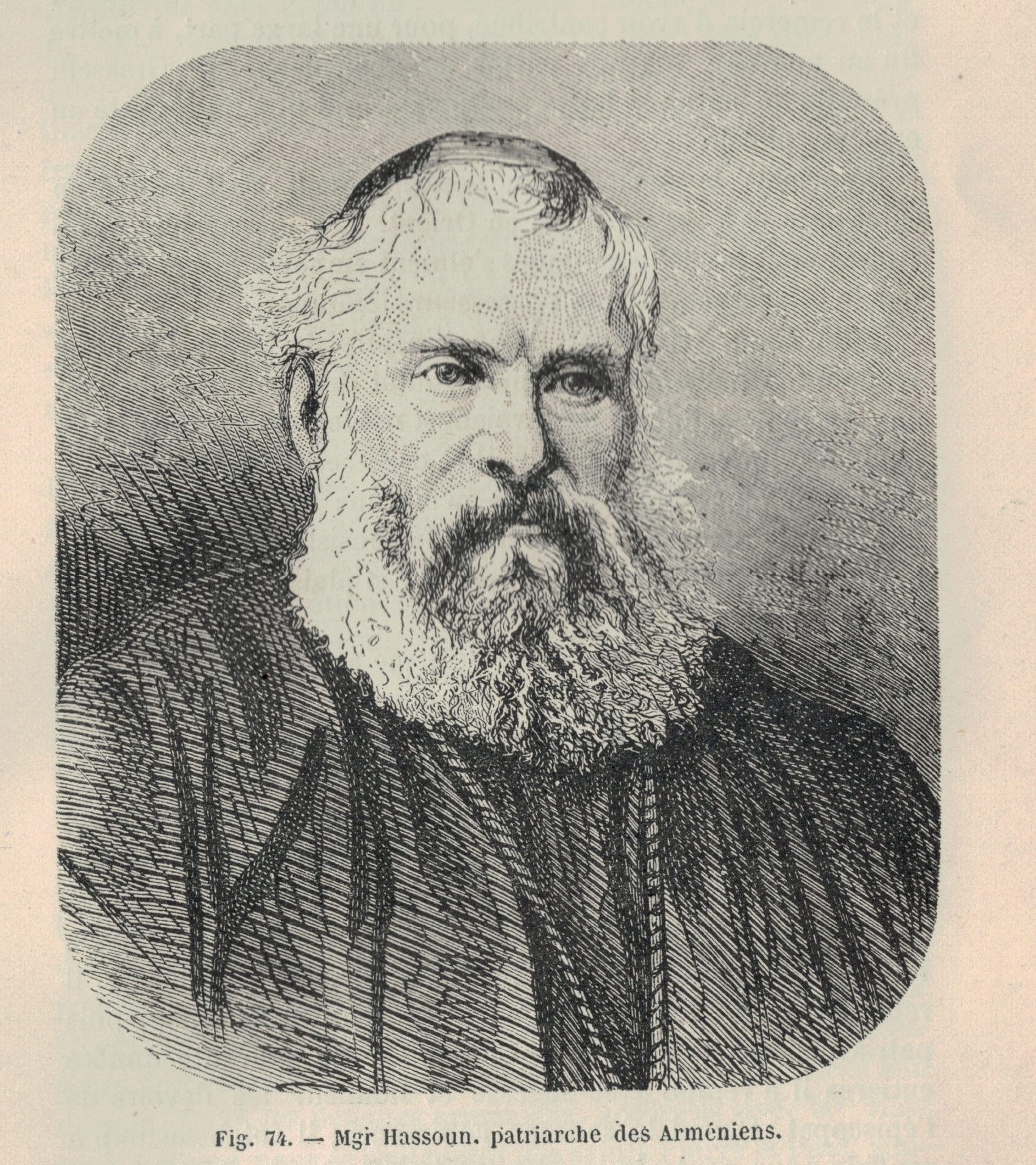
Andon Bedros Hassoun (1809–1884), made a cardinal on 13 December 1880

Pope Leo announced the creation of one cardinal on 13 December 1880, reserving the names of three others in pectore. Hassoun was the first Armenian cardinal and first Oriental-rite cardinal since 1439. Ricci Paracciani's cousin Salvatore Nobili Vitelleschi was made a cardinal in 1875, just five months before he died.

Name	Title when named cardinal	Country
Andon Bedros Hassoun (1809–1884)	Patriarch of Cilicia of the Armenians	Ottoman Empire

=== Cardinal in pectore ===
Name	Title when named cardinal	Country	Revealed as Cardinal
Carlo Laurenzi (1821–1893)	Auxiliary Bishop of Perugia	Italy	10 November 1884
Francesco Ricci Paracciani (1830–1894)	Prefect of the Prefecture of the Holy Apostolic Palaces	Italy	27 March 1882
Pietro Lasagni (1814–1885)	Secretary of the Sacred College of Cardinals	Italy	27 March 1882

== 27 March 1882 ==
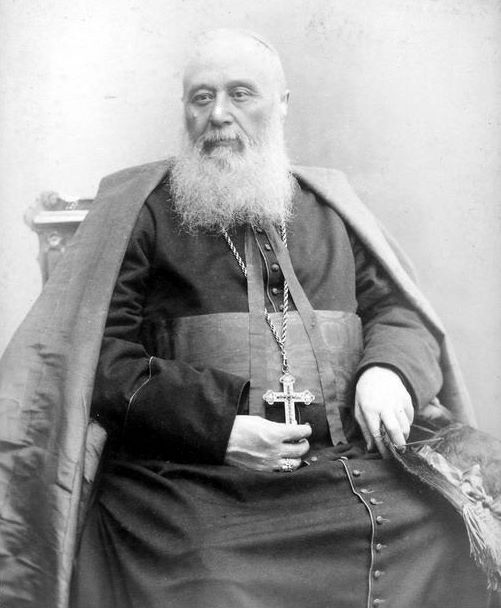
Charles Lavigerie (1825–1892), made a cardinal on 27 March 1882

On 27 March 1882, Pope Leo announced the names of two cardinals he had created in pectore in December 1880 and created another five, revealing the names of all but one (Lavigerie). Angelo Jacobini joined his cousin Luigi, then Secretary of State, who was made a cardinal in 1879.

Name	Title when named cardinal	Country
Domenico Agostini (1825–1891)	Patriarch of Venice	Italy
Joaquín Lluch y Garriga (1816–1882)	Archbishop of Sevilla	Spain
Edward MacCabe (1816–1885)	Archbishop of Dublin	(United Kingdom of Great Britain and Ireland) Great Britain
Angelo Jacobini (1825–1886)	Secretary Emeritus of the Sacred Congregation for Extraordinary Ecclesiastical Affairs	Italy

=== Cardinal in pectore ===
Name	Title when named cardinal	Country	Revealed as Cardinal
Charles Lavigerie (1825–1892)	Archbishop of Algiers	Algeria	3 July 1882

== 25 September 1882 ==
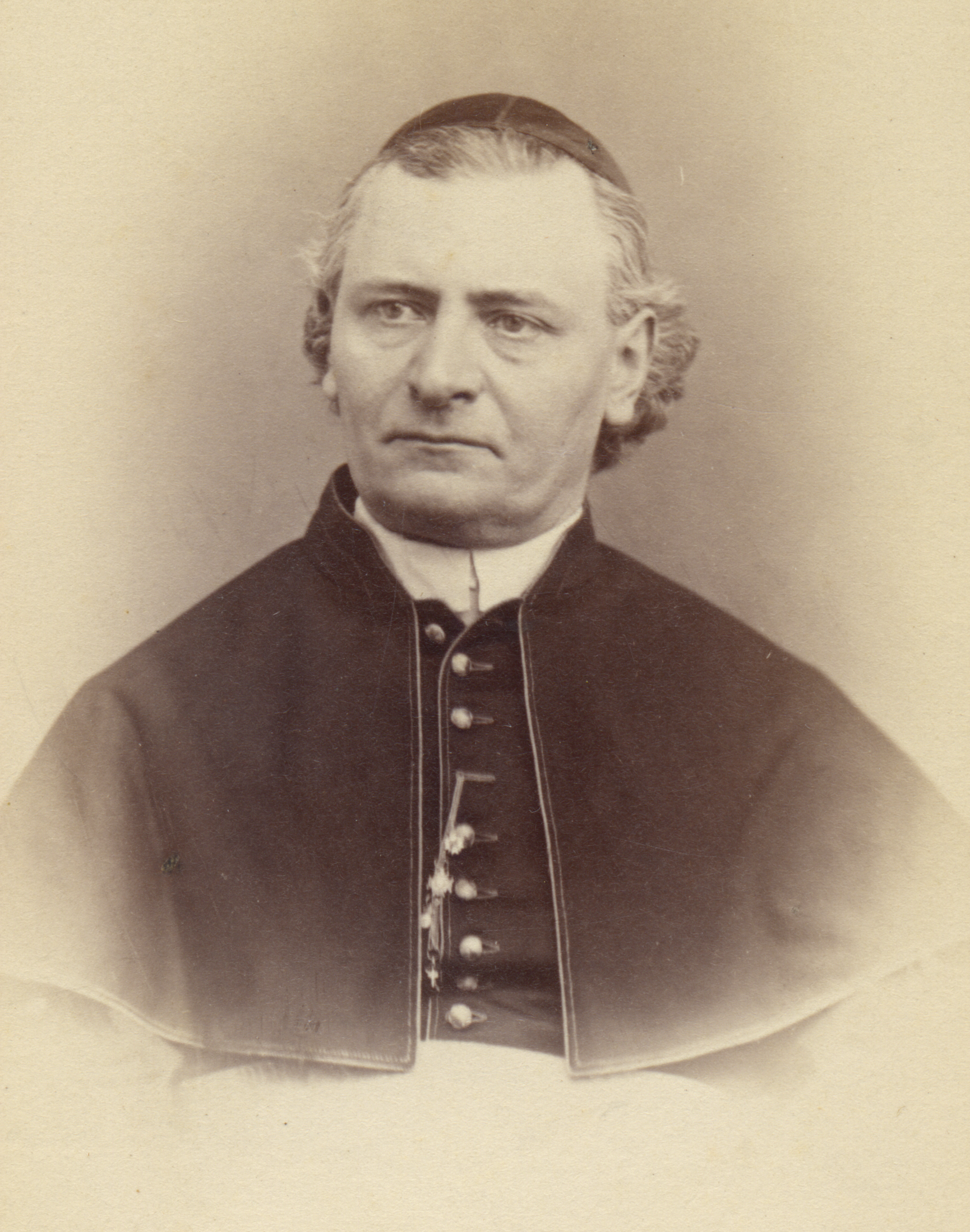
Angelo Bianchi (1817–1897), made a cardinal on 25 September 1882

Pope Leo announced the creation of two cardinals on 25 September 1882.

Name	Title when named cardinal	Country
Angelo Bianchi (1817–1897)	Secretary Emeritus of the Sacred Congregation of Bishops and Regulars	Italy
Włodzimierz Czacki (1834–1888)	Apostolic Nuncio to France	Russian Empire

== 24 March 1884 ==
Pope Leo created two cardinals on 24 March 1884.

Name	Title when named cardinal	Country
José Sebastião de Almeida Neto (1841–1920)	Patriarch of Lisbon	Portugal
Guglielmo Sanfelice d'Acquavella (1834–1897)	Archbishop of Naples	Italy

== 10 November 1884 ==
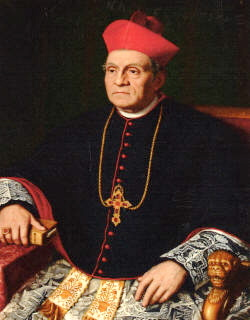
Michelangelo Celesia (1814–1904), made a cardinal on 10 November 1884

On 10 November 1884, Pope Leo announced the creation of eight cardinals and announced the name of one, Carlo Laurenzi, made a cardinal in pectore in December 1880.

Name	Title when named cardinal	Country
Michelangelo Celesia (1814–1904)	Archbishop of Palermo	Italy
Antolín Monescillo y Viso (1811–1897)	Archbishop of Valencia	Spain
Guglielmo Massaia (1809–1889)	Vicar Apostolic Emeritus of the Galla	Italy
Cölestin Josef Ganglbauer (1817–1889)	Archbishop of Vienna	Austria-Hungary
Zeferino González y Díaz Tuñón (1831–1894)	Archbishop of Sevilla	Spain
Carmine Gori-Merosi (1810–1886)	Secretary of the Sacred Consistorial Congregation	Italy
Ignazio Masotti (1817–1888)	Secretary of the Sacred Congregation of Bishops and Regulars	Italy
Isidoro Verga (1832–1899)	Secretary of the Sacred Congregation of the Council	Italy

== 27 July 1885 ==
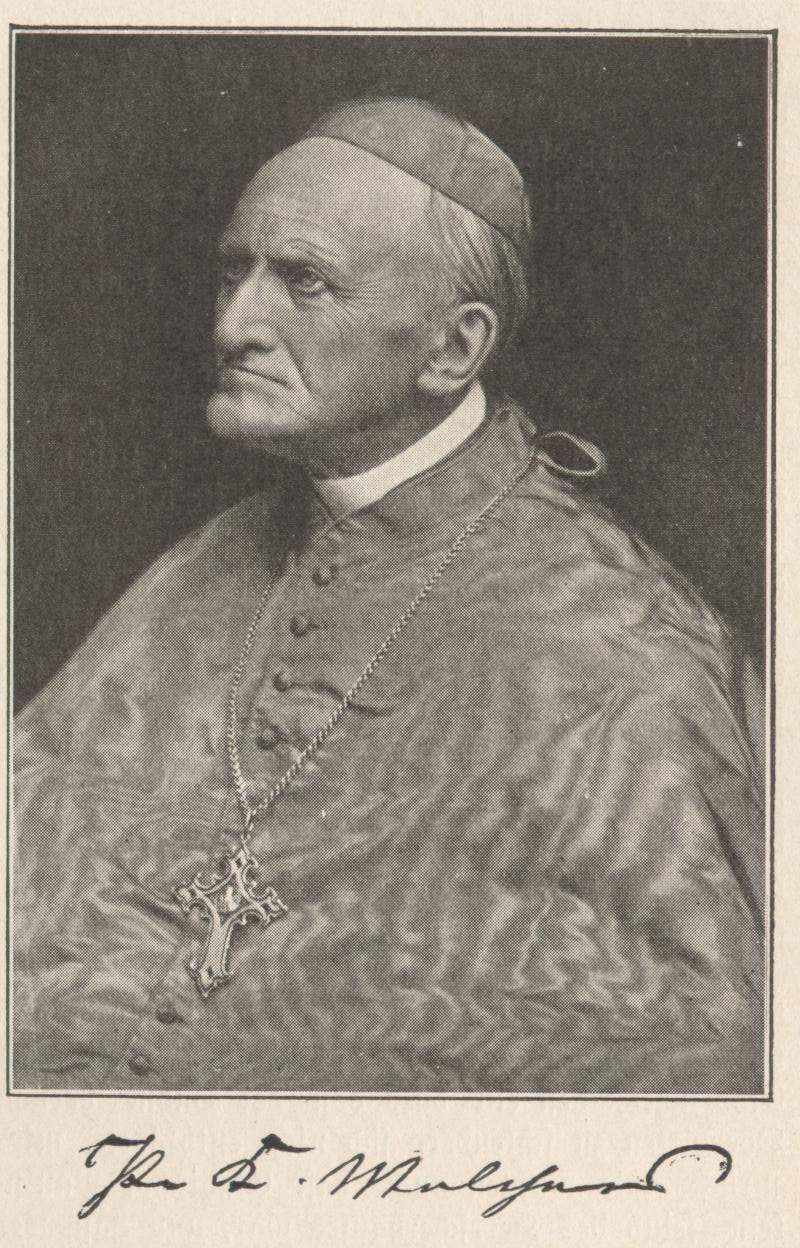
Paul Melchers (1813–1895), made a cardinal on 27 July 1885

On 27 July 1885, Pope Leo created five cardinals of the order of cardinal priests and one cardinal deacon (Cristofori).

Name	Title when named cardinal	Country
Paul Melchers (1813–1895)	Archbishop of Cologne	Germany
Alfonso Capecelatro (1824–1912)	Archbishop of Capua	Italy
Francesco Battaglini (1823–1892)	Archbishop of Bologna	Italy
Patrick Francis Moran (1830–1911)	Archbishop of Sydney	Australia
Placido Maria Schiaffino (1829–1889)	Secretary of the Sacred Congregation of Bishops and Regulars	Italy
Carlo Cristofori (1813–1891)	Auditor General of the Reverend Apostolic Camera	Italy

== 7 June 1886 ==
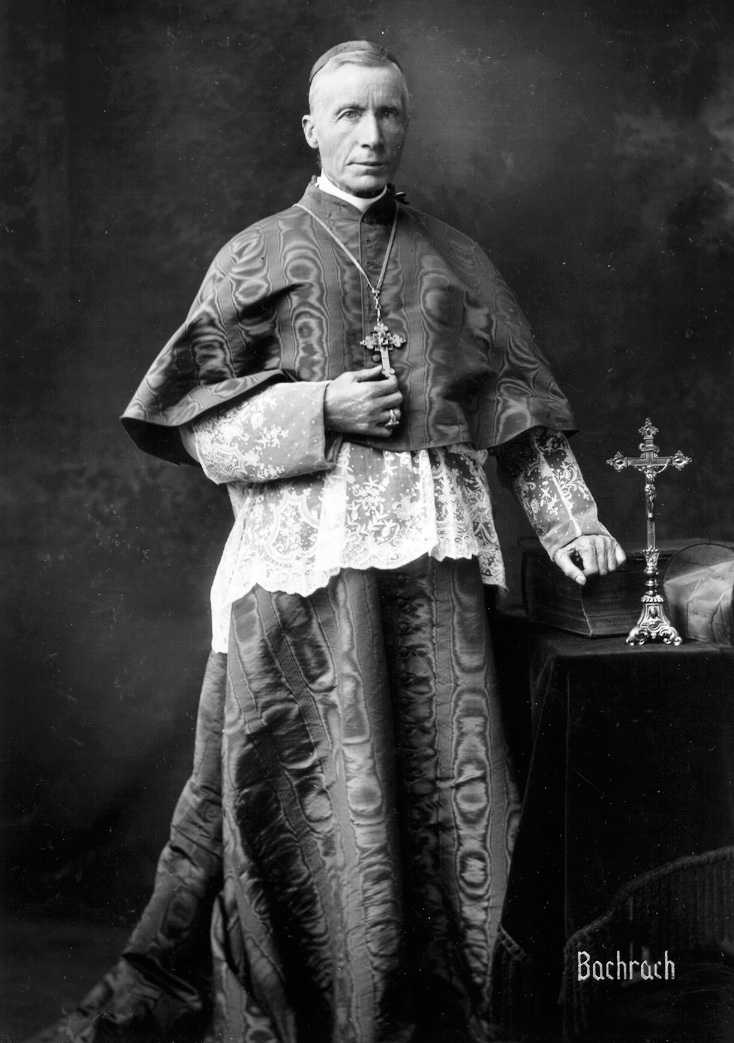
James Gibbons (1834–1921), made a cardinal on 7 June 1886

Pope Leo created seven cardinals on 7 June 1886. The two cardinal deacons Pope Leo created on 7 June 1886, Theodoli and Mazzella, were assigned their deaconries on 10 June; the other five cardinal priests were given their titular churches on 17 March 1887.

Name	Title when named cardinal	Country
Victor-Félix Bernadou (1816–1891)	Archbishop of Sens	France
Elzéar-Alexandre Taschereau (1820–1898)	Archbishop of Québec	Canada
Benoit-Marie Langénieux (1824–1905)	Archbishop of Reims	France
James Gibbons (1834–1921)	Archbishop of Baltimore	United States
Charles-Philippe Place (1814–1893)	Archbishop of Rennes	France
Augusto Theodoli (1819–1892)	Prefect of the Prefecture of the Holy Apostolic Palaces	Italy
Camillo Mazzella (1833–1900)	Prefect at Pontifical Gregorian University	Italy

== 14 March 1887 ==
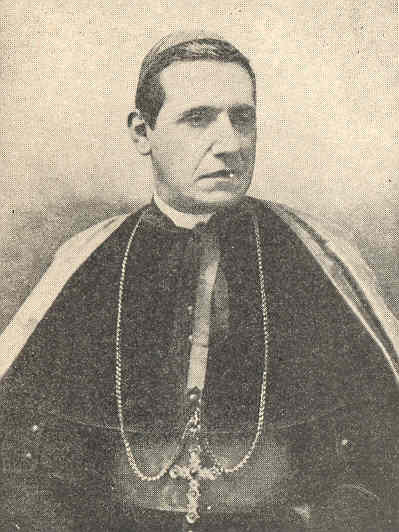
Mariano Rampolla (1843–1913), made a cardinal on 14 March 1887

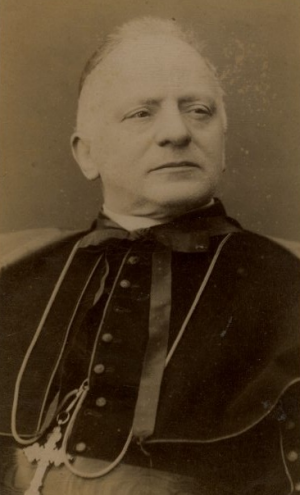
Luigi Giordani (1822–1893), made a cardinal on 14 March 1887

Pope Leo created five cardinals, all cardinal priests, on 14 March 1887.

Name	Title when named cardinal	Country
Serafino Vannutelli (1834–1915)	Apostolic Nuncio to Austria-Hungary	Italy
Gaetano Aloisi Masella (1826–1902)	Apostolic Nuncio Emeritus to Portugal	Italy
Luigi Giordani (1822–1893)	Archbishop of Ferrara	Italy
Camillo Siciliano di Rende (1847–1897)	Archbishop of Benevento	Italy
Mariano Rampolla (1843–1913)	Apostolic Nuncio to Spain	Italy

== 23 May 1887 ==
Pope Leo created two cardinal deacons on 23 May 1887. Bausa was not yet a bishop and was only consecrated in March 1889. Pallotti was never consecrated a bishop.

Name	Title when named cardinal	Country
Luigi Pallotti (1829–1890)	Auditor General of the Reverend Apostolic Camera	Italy
Agostino Bausa (1821–1899)	Master of the Sacred Palace of the Prefecture of the Holy Apostolic Palaces	Italy

== 11 February 1889 ==
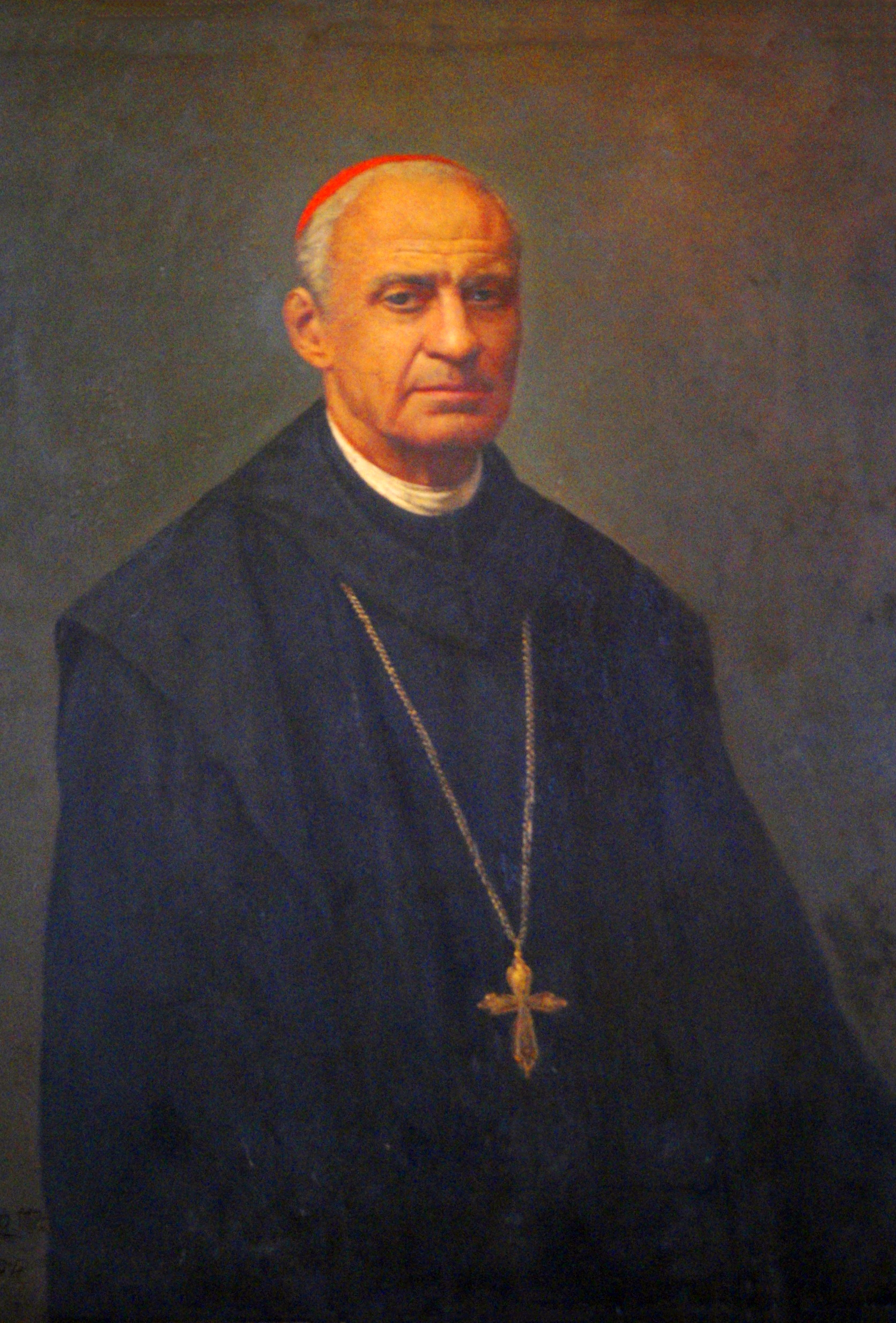
Giuseppe Benedetto Dusmet (1818–1894), made a cardinal on 11 February 1889

Pope Leo announced the creation of three cardinals on 11 February 1889.

Name	Title when named cardinal	Country
Giuseppe Benedetto Dusmet (1818–1894)	Archbishop of Catania	Italy
Giuseppe d'Annibale (1815–1892)	Titular Bishop of Carystus (Note: Titular see based in Rome.)	Italy
Luigi Macchi (1832–1907)	Prefect of the Prefecture of the Holy Apostolic Palaces	Italy

== 24 May 1889 ==
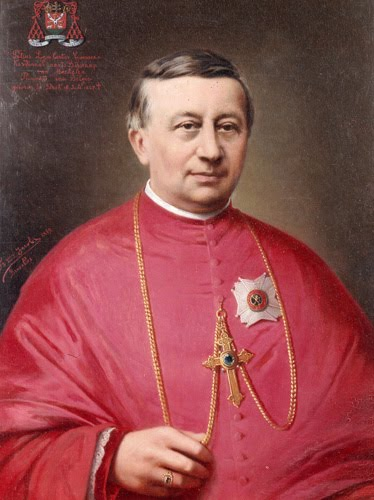
Pierre-Lambert Goossens (1827–1906), made a cardinal on 24 May 1889

Pope Leo created seven cardinals on 24 May 1889. Guilbert died less than three months later without having visited Rome to be assigned his titular church.

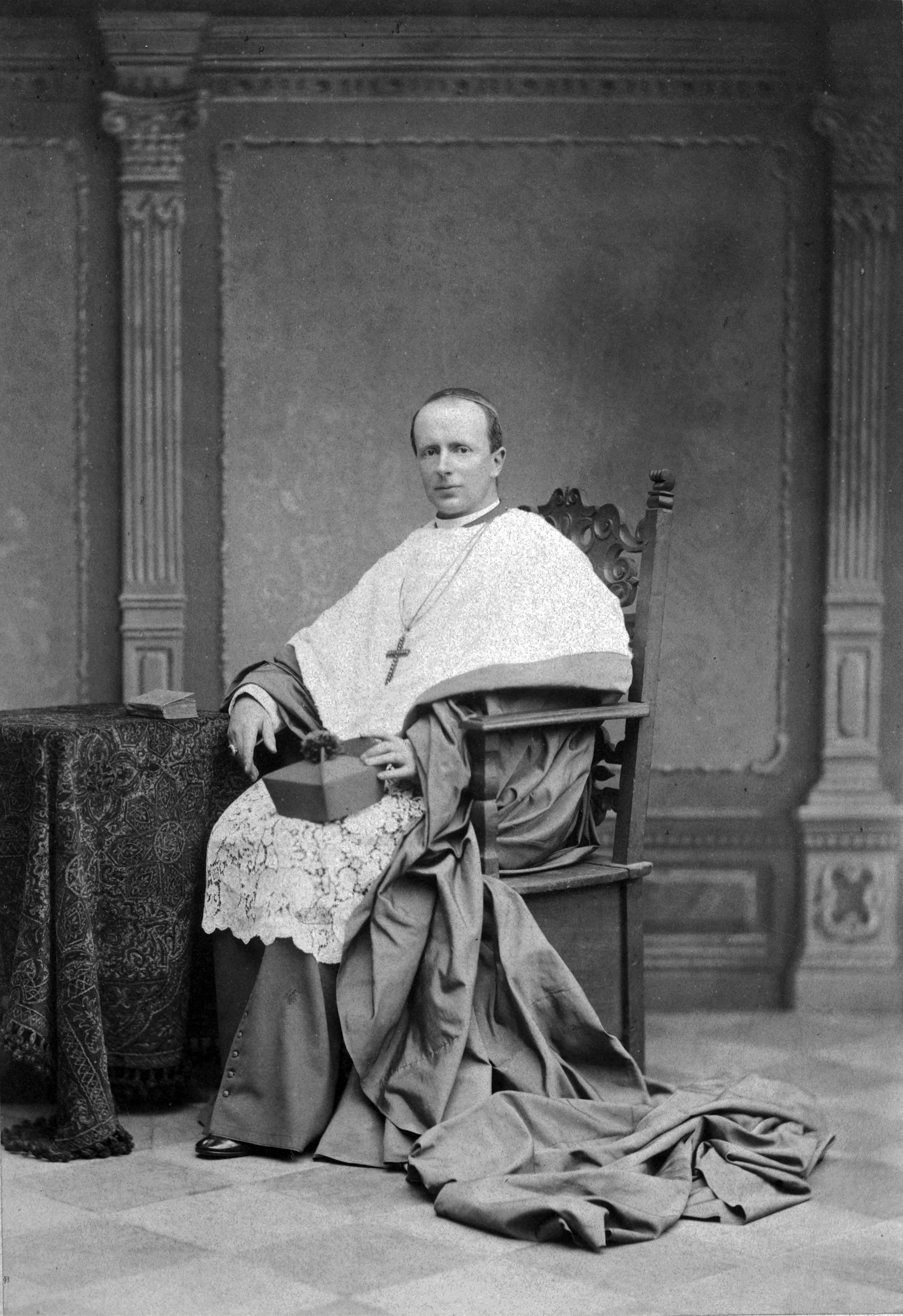
Franziskus von Paula Graf von Schönborn (1844–1899), made a cardinal on 24 May 1889.

Name	Title when named cardinal	Country
François-Marie-Benjamin Richard (1819–1908)	Archbishop of Paris	France
Joseph-Alfred Foulon (1823–1893)	Archbishop of Lyon	France
Aimé-Victor-François Guilbert (1812–1889)	Archbishop of Bordeaux	France
Pierre-Lambert Goossens (1827–1906)	Archbishop of Mechelen	Belgium
Franziskus von Paula Graf von Schönborn (1844–1899)	Archbishop of Prague	Austria-Hungary
Achille Apolloni (1823–1893)	Vice-Camerlengo of the Reverend Apostolic Camera	Italy
Gaetano de Ruggiero (1816–1896)	Secretary of the Fabric of Saint Peter	Italy

== 30 December 1889 ==
On 30 December 1889, Pope Leo created a single cardinal without making it known. His brother Serafino was already a cardinal.

=== Cardinal in pectore ===
Name	Title when named cardinal	Country	Revealed as Cardinal
Vincenzo Vannutelli (1836–1930)	Apostolic Nuncio to Portugal	Italy	23 June 1890

== 23 June 1890 ==
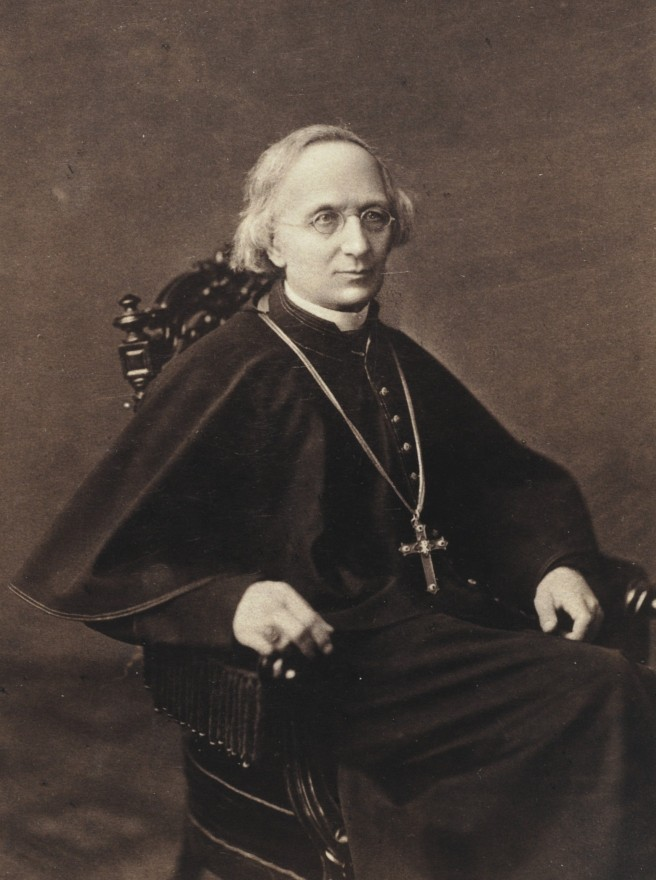
Albin Dunajewski (1817–1894), made a cardinal on 23 June 1890

Pope Leo created three cardinals of the order of cardinal priests on 23 June 1890 and announced he had created Vincenzo Vannutelli a cardinal in pectore the previous December.

Name	Title when named cardinal	Country
Sebastiano Galeati (1822–1901)	Archbishop of Ravenna	Italy
Gaspard Mermillod (1824–1892)	Bishop of Lausanne and Geneva	Switzerland
Albin Dunajewski (1817–1894)	Bishop of Krakow	Austria-Hungary

== 1 June 1891 ==
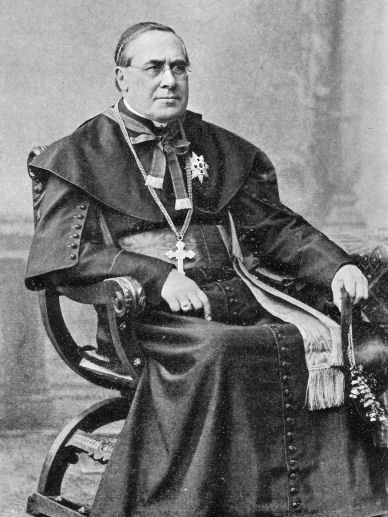
Anton Josef Gruscha (1820–1911), made a cardinal on 1 June 1891

Pope Leo created two cardinals on 1 June 1891. Rotelli received his red hat from French President Sadi Carnot, but died before being invested by the pope with the other symbols of his new rank.

Name	Title when named cardinal	Country
Luigi Rotelli (1833–1891)	Apostolic Nuncio to France	Italy
Anton Josef Gruscha (1820–1911)	Archbishop of Vienna	Austria-Hungary

== 14 December 1891 ==
Pope Leo created two cardinals of the order of cardinal priests on 14 December 1891.

Name	Title when named cardinal	Country
Fulco Luigi Ruffo-Scilla (1840–1895)	Prefect of the Prefecture of the Holy Apostolic Palaces	Italy
Luigi Sepiacci (1835–1893)	Secretary of the Sacred Congregation of Bishops and Regulars	Italy

== 16 January 1893 ==
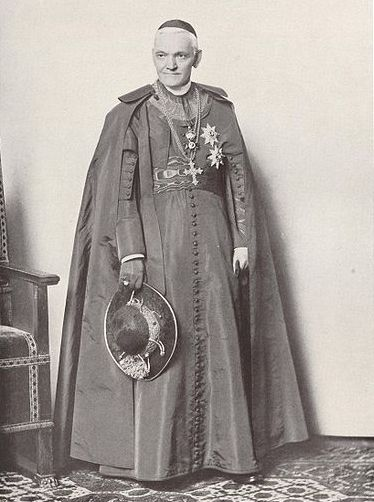
Kolos Ferenc Vaszary (1832–1915), made a cardinal on 16 January 1893

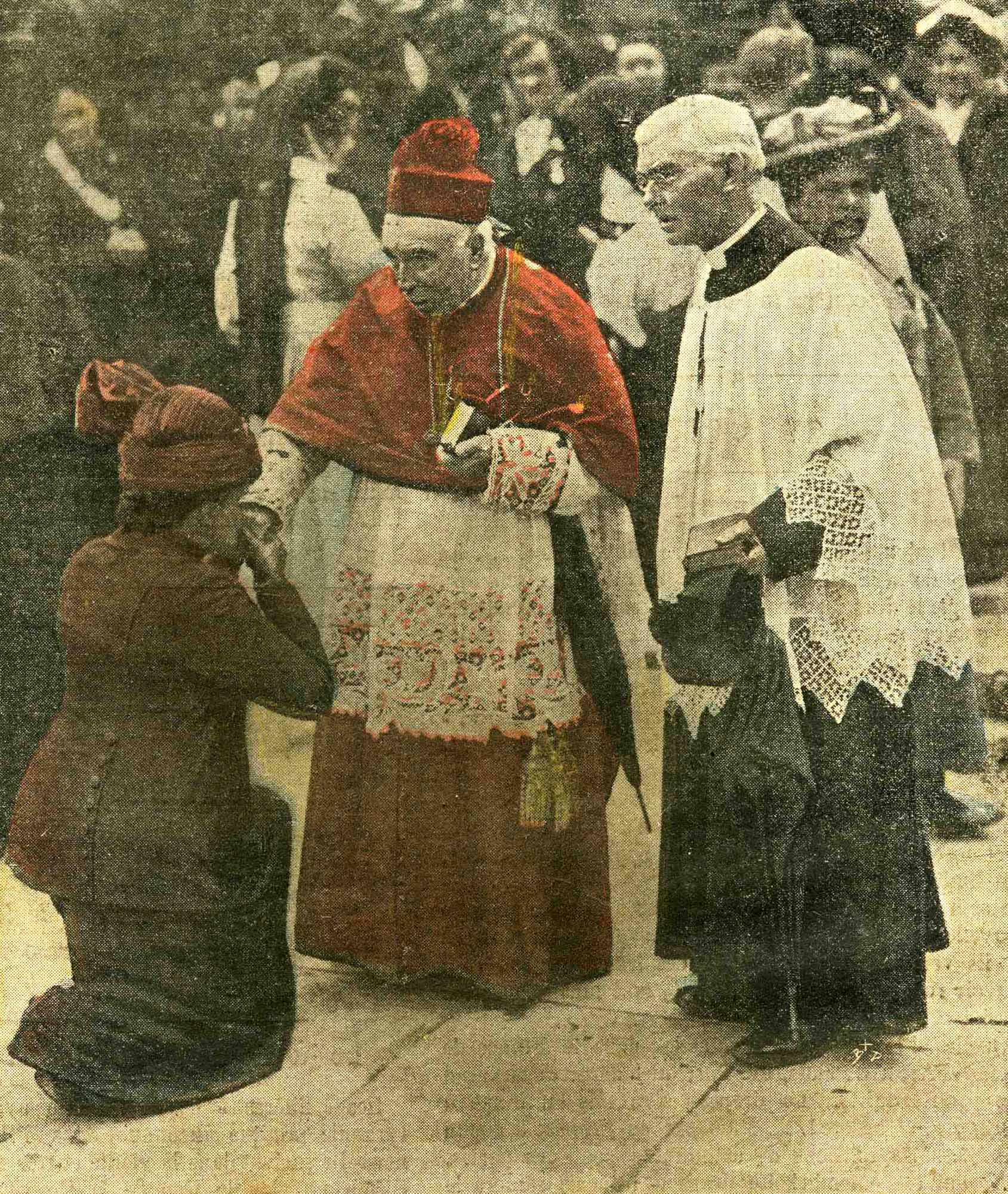
Michael Logue (1840–1924), made a cardinal on 16 January 1893

Pope Leo created fourteen cardinals publicly on 16 January 1893 and two others in pectore.

Name	Title when named cardinal	Country
Giuseppe Guarino (1827–1897)	Archbishop of Messina	Italy
Mario Mocenni (1823–1904)	Substitute for General Affairs of the Apostolic Secretariat	Italy
Amilcare Malagola (1840–1895)	Archbishop of Fermo	Italy
Angelo Di Pietro (1828–1914)	Apostolic Nuncio Emeritus to Bavaria	Italy
Benito Sanz y Forés (1828–1895)	Archbishop of Sevilla	Spain
Guillaume-René Meignan (1817–1896)	Archbishop of Tours	France
Léon-Benoît-Charles Thomas (1826–1894)	Archbishop of Rouen	France
Philipp Krementz (1819–1899)	Archbishop of Cologne	Germany
Ignatius Persico (1823–1896)	Secretary of the Sacred Congregation of the Propagation of the Faith	Italy
Luigi Galimberti (1835–1896)	Apostolic Nuncio to Austria-Hungary	Italy
Michael Logue (1840–1924)	Archbishop of Armagh	(United Kingdom of Great Britain and Ireland) Great Britain
Kolos Ferenc Vaszary (1832–1915)	Archbishop of Esztergom	Austria-Hungary
Herbert Vaughan (1832–1903)	Archbishop of Westminster	(United Kingdom of Great Britain and Ireland) Great Britain
Georg von Kopp (1837–1914)	Bishop of Wrocław	Austria-Hungary

=== Cardinal in pectore ===
Name	Title when named cardinal	Country	Revealed as Cardinal
Adolphe Perraud (1828–1906)	Bishop of Autun and Superior General of Oratory of France	France	29 November 1895
Andreas Steinhuber	Priest of Society of Jesus	Germany	18 May 1894

== 12 June 1893 ==
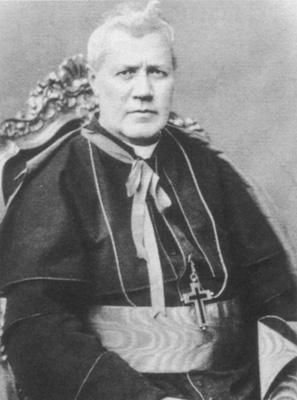
Giuseppe Sarto (1835–1914), made a cardinal on 12 June 1893, and elected as Pope Pius X on 4 August 1903.

Pope Leo created five cardinals in a consistory held on 12 June 1893, including Giuseppe Sarto, his successor as Pope Pius X.

Name	Title when named cardinal	Country
Victor-Lucien-Sulpice Lécot (1831–1908)	Archbishop of Bordeaux	France
Giuseppe Maria Graniello (1834–1896)	Secretary of the Congregation of Bishops and Regulars	Italy
Joseph-Christian-Ernest Bourret (1827–1896)	Bishop of Rodez	France
Lőrinc Schlauch (1824–1902)	Bishop of Oradea Mare	Austria-Hungary
Giuseppe Sarto (1835–1914)	Bishop of Mantova	Italy

== 18 May 1894 ==
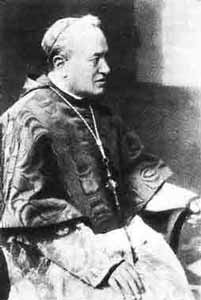
Andrea Carlo Ferrari (1850–1921), made a cardinal on 18 May 1894

Pope Leo created five cardinals in May 1894, four cardinal priests and one cardinal deacon (Segna). He announced that he had made Andreas Steinhuber a cardinal in pectore previously.

Name	Title when named cardinal	Country
Egidio Mauri (1828–1896)	Archbishop of Ferrara	Italy
Ciriaco María Sancha y Hervás (1833–1909)	Archbishop of Valencia	Spain
Domenico Svampa (1851–1907)	Bishop of Forli	Italy
Andrea Carlo Ferrari (1850–1921)	Bishop of Como	Italy
Francesco Segna (1836–1911)	Assessor of the Commission of Roman and Universal Inquisition	Italy

== 29 November 1895 ==
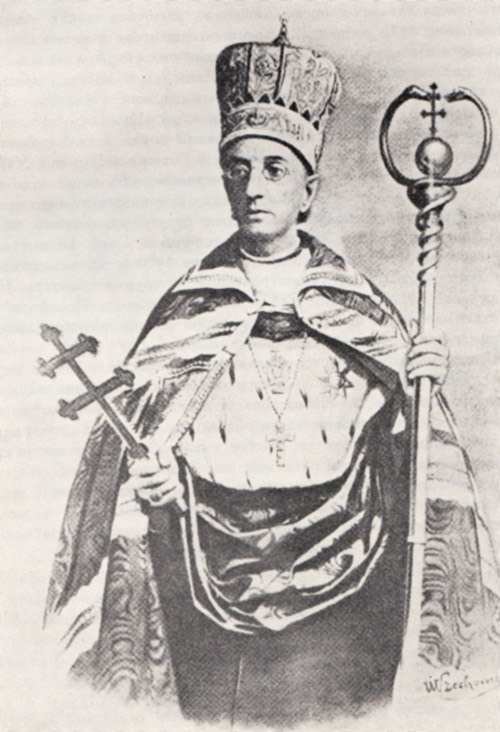
Sylvester Sembratovych (1836–1898), made a cardinal on 29 November 1895

Pope Leo created eight cardinals on 29 November 1895 and announced that he had made Adolphe Perraud a cardinal in pectore in 1893. Francesco Satolli, Apostolic Delegate to the United States, did not travel to Rome for the ceremony, but received his insignia of office from Cardinal James Gibbons, Archbishop of Baltimore, on 5 January 1896.

Name	Title when named cardinal	Country
Sylvester Sembratovych (1836–1898)	Major-Archbishop of Lviv-Galicia	Austria-Hungary
Francesco Satolli (1839–1910)	Apostolic Delegate to the United States	Italy
Johannes Evangelist Haller (1825–1900)	Archbishop of Salzburg	Austria-Hungary
Antonio María Cascajares y Azara (1834–1901)	Archbishop of Valladolid	Spain
Girolamo Maria Gotti (1834–1916)	Apostolic Internuncio to Brazil	Italy
Jean-Pierre Boyer (1829–1896)	Archbishop of Bourges	France
Achille Manara (1827–1906)	Bishop of Ancona e Umana	Italy
Salvador Casañas y Pagés (1834–1908)	Bishop of Urgell	Spain

== 22 June 1896 ==
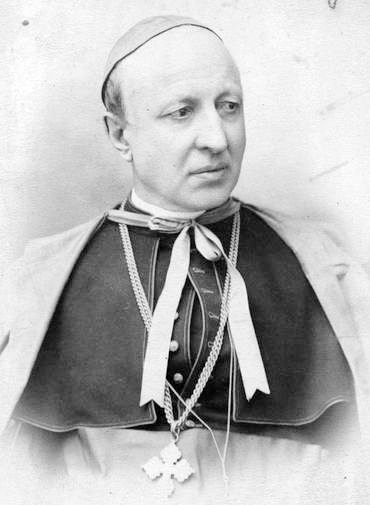
Antonio Agliardi (1832–1915), made a cardinal on 22 June 1896

Pope Leo created four cardinals of the order of cardinal priests on 22 June 1896.

Name	Title when named cardinal	Country
Domenico Jacobini (1837–1900) (Note: Apparently not related to the two other Jacobinis made cardinal by Leo XIII.)	Apostolic Nuncio to Portugal	Italy
Antonio Agliardi (1832–1915)	Apostolic Nuncio to Austria-Hungary	Italy
Domenico Ferrata (1847–1914)	Apostolic Nuncio to France	Italy
Serafino Cretoni (1833–1909)	Apostolic Nuncio to Spain	Italy

== 30 November 1896 ==
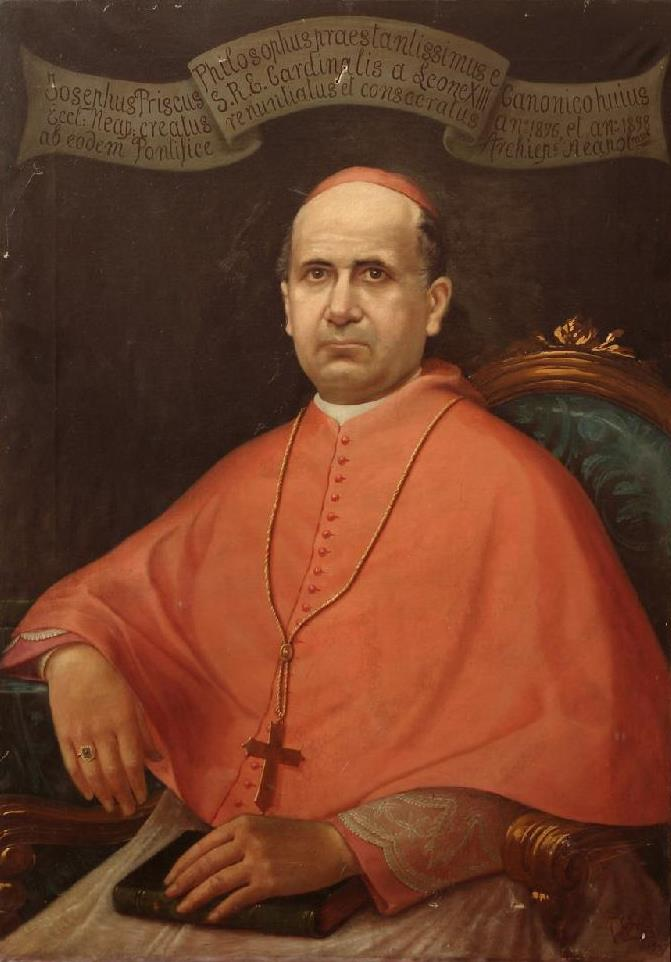
Giuseppe Antonio Ermenegildo Prisco (1833–1923), made a cardinal on 30 November 1896

Two cardinals were created on 30 November 1896; they received their red galeri on 3 December. Neither was a bishop when made cardinal; Prisco was consecrated in 1898.

Name	Title when named cardinal	Country
Raffaele Pierotti (1836–1905)	Master of the Sacred Palace of the Prefecture of the Holy Apostolic Palaces	Italy
Giuseppe Antonio Ermenegildo Prisco (1833–1923)	Prefect of Studies at the Archiepiscopal Seminary of Naples	Italy

== 19 April 1897 ==
Pope Leo created four cardinals on 19 April 1897.

Name	Title when named cardinal	Country
José María Martín de Herrera y de la Iglesia (1835–1922)	Archbishop of Santiago de Compostela	Spain
Pierre-Hector Coullié (1829–1912)	Archbishop of Lyon	France
Guillaume-Marie-Joseph Labouré (1841–1906)	Archbishop of Rennes	France
Guillaume-Marie-Romain Sourrieu (1825–1899)	Archbishop of Rouen	France

== 19 June 1899 ==
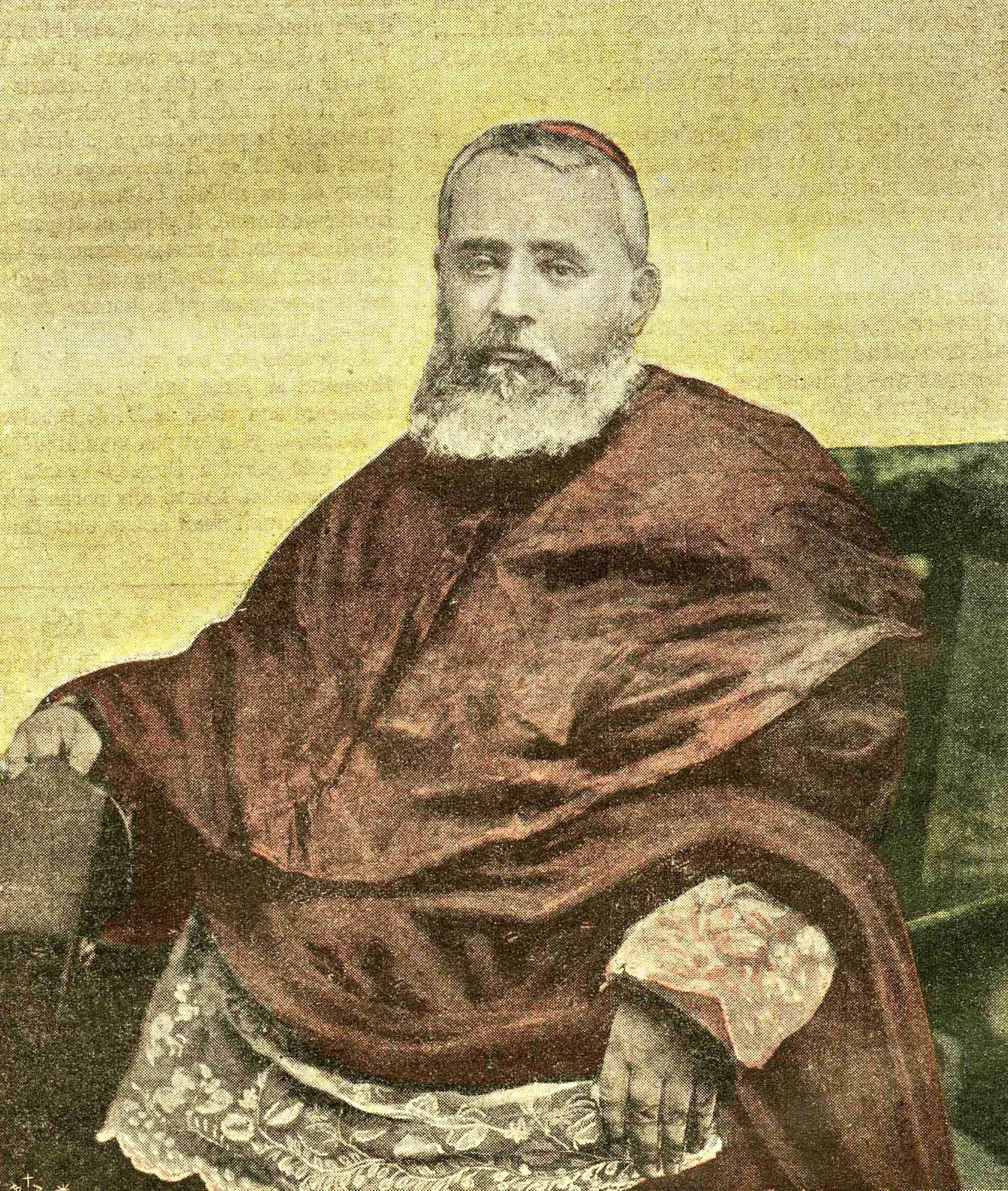
José Calassanç Vives y Tuto (1854–1913), made a cardinal on 19 June 1899

Pope Leo announced the creation of 11 new cardinals on 19 June 1899 and created two in pectore, Alessandro Sanminiatelli Zabarella and Francesco Salesio Della Volpe, whose names were published in 1901. Missia was the first Slovenian to enter the College of Cardinals.

Name	Title when named cardinal	Country
Giovanni Battista Casali del Drago (1838–1908)	Latin Patriarch of Constantinople	Italy
Francesco di Paola Cassetta (1841–1919)	Latin Patriarch of Antioch	Italy
Gennaro Portanova (1845–1908)	Auditor General of the Reverend Apostolic Camera	Italy
Giuseppe Francica-Nava de Bontifè (1846–1928)	Archbishop of Catania	Italy
Agostino Ciasca (1835–1902)	Secretary of the Sacred Congregation of the Propagation of the Faith	Italy
François-Désiré Mathieu (1839–1908)	Archbishop of Toulouse	France
Pietro Respighi (1843–1913)	Archbishop of Ferrara	Italy
Agostino Richelmy (1850–1923)	Archbishop of Turin	Italy
Jakob Missia (1838–1902)	Archbishop of Gorizia and Gradisca	Austria-Hungary
Luigi Trombetta (1820–1900)	Secretary of the Sacred Congregation of Bishops and Regulars	Italy
José Calassanç Vives y Tuto (1854–1913)	Priest from the Order of Friars Minor Capuchin	Spain

=== Cardinal in pectore ===
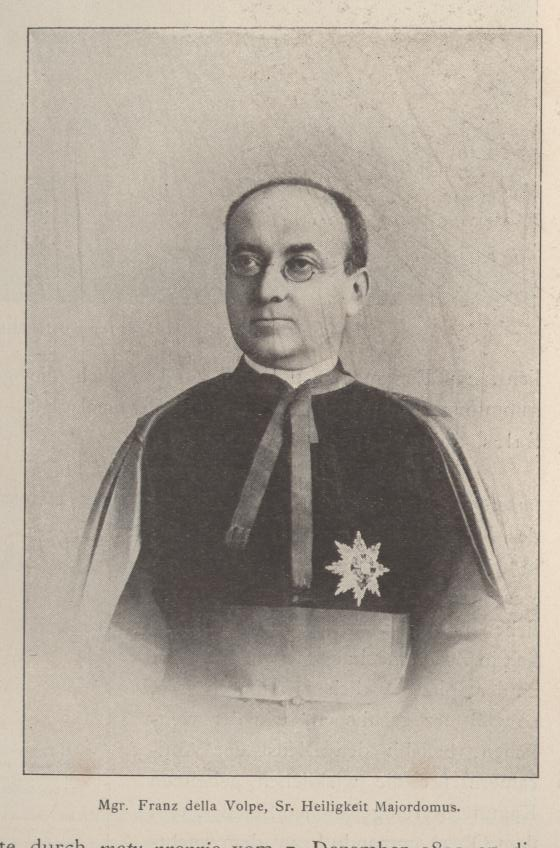
Francesco Salesio Della Volpe (1844–1916), made a cardinal in pectore on 19 June 1899 and published on 15 April 1901

Name	Title when named cardinal	Country	Revealed as Cardinal
Alessandro Sanminiatelli Zabarella (1840–1910)	Auditor General of the Reverend Apostolic Camera	Italy	15 April 1901
Francesco Salesio Della Volpe (1844–1916)	Prefect of the Prefecture of the Holy Apostolic Palaces	Italy	15 April 1901

== 15 April 1901 ==
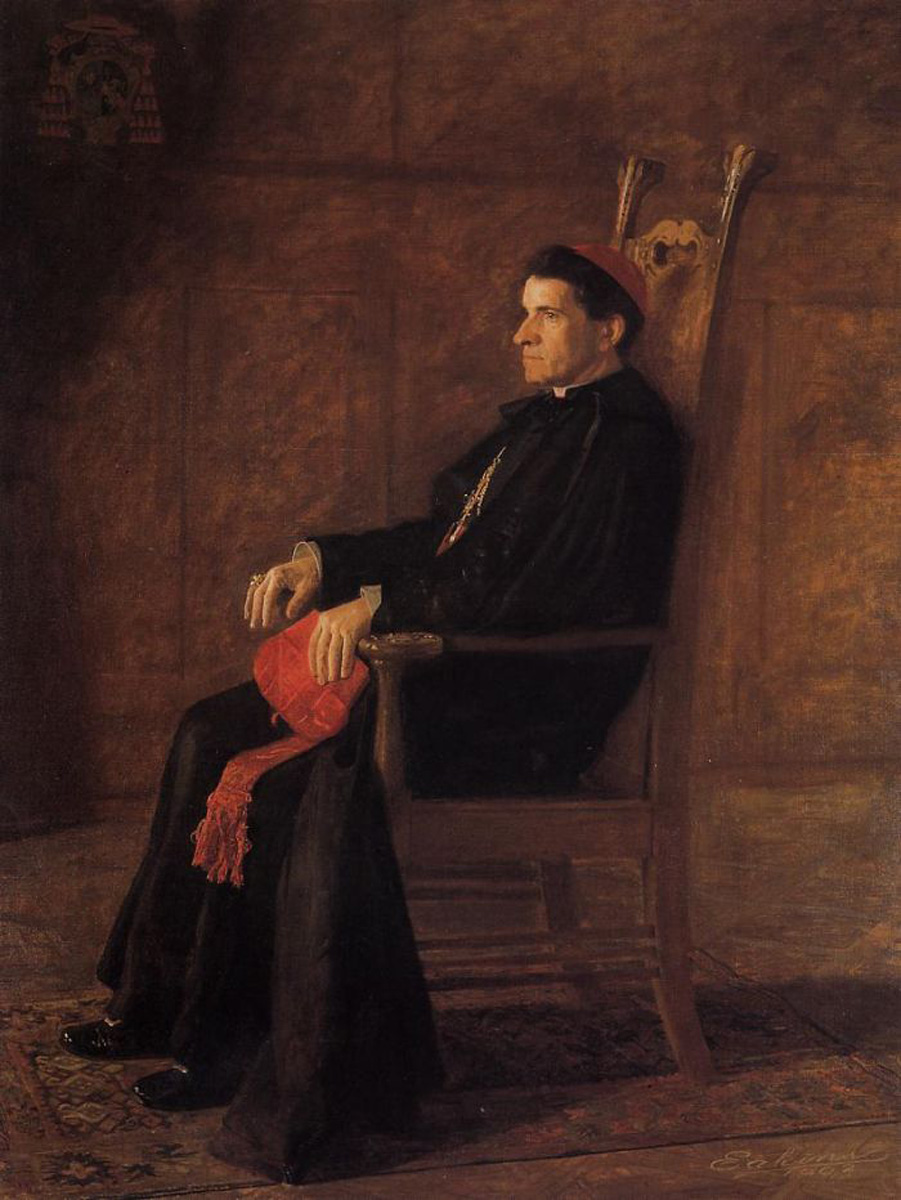
Sebastiano Martinelli (1848–1918), made a cardinal on 15 April 1901

Pope Leo created ten cardinals on 15 April 1901, assigning eight to the order of cardinal priests and two to the order of cardinal deacons (Tripepi and Cavagnis).

Name	Title when named cardinal	Country
Donato Maria Dell'Olio (1847–1902)	Archbishop of Benevento	Italy
Sebastiano Martinelli (1848–1918)	Apostolic Delegate to the United States	Italy
Casimiro Gennari (1839–1914)	Assessor of the Commission of Roman and Universal Inquisition	Italy
Lev Skrbenský z Hříště (1863–1938)	Archbishop of Prague	Austria-Hungary
Giulio Boschi (1838–1920)	Archbishop of Ferrara	Italy
Agostino Gaetano Riboldi (1839–1902)	Bishop of Pavia	Italy
Jan Puzyna de Kosielsko (1842–1911)	Bishop of Krakow	Austria-Hungary
Bartolomeo Bacilieri (1842–1923)	Bishop of Verona	Italy
Luigi Tripepi (1836–1906)	Substitute for General Affairs of the Apostolic Secretariat	Italy
Felice Cavagnis (1841–1906)	Secretary of the Sacred Congregation for Extraordinary Ecclesiastical Affairs	Italy

== 22 June 1903 ==
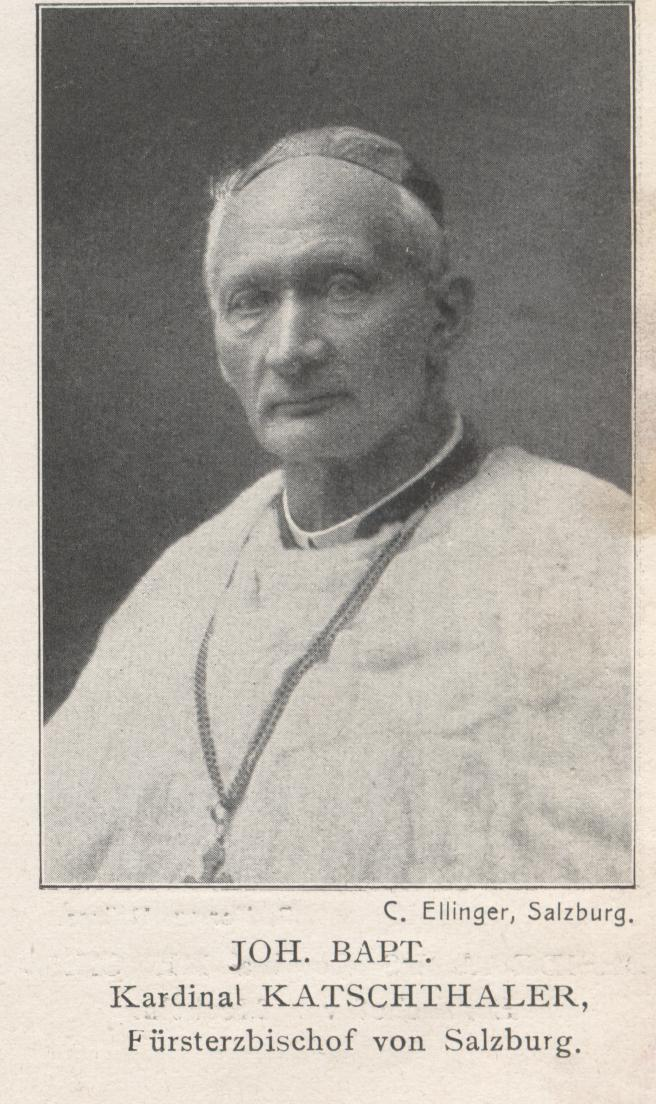
Johannes Katschthaler (1832–1914), made a cardinal on 22 June 1903

At his last consistory held less than a month before his death, Pope Leo created seven cardinals and assigned them all to the order of cardinal priests. Only Nocella, Cavicchioni, and Fischer were present to receive their red hats from the pope and be assigned their titular sees on 25 June. The others participated in the conclave that elected Pope Pius X and it was from him that Herrero received his red galero and titular church assignment on 27 August, as did Aiuti, Taliani, and Karschthaler theirs on 12 November 1903.

Name	Title when named cardinal	Country
Carlo Nocella (1826–1908)	Latin Patriarch of Constantinople	Italy
Beniamino Cavicchioni (1836–1911)	Secretary of the Sacred Congregation of the Council	Italy
Andrea Aiuti (1849–1905)	Apostolic Nuncio to Portugal	Italy
Emidio Taliani (1838–1907)	Apostolic Nuncio to Austria-Hungary	Italy
Sebastián Herrero y Espinosa de los Monteros (1822–1903)	Archbishop of Valencia	Spain
Johannes Katschthaler (1832–1914)	Archbishop of Salzburg	Austria-Hungary
Anton Hubert Fischer (1840–1912)	Archbishop of Cologne	Germany
