= Andrea Aiuti =

Italian Catholic prelate (1849–1905)

His Eminence Andrea Aiuti
- Cardinal-Priest of San Girolamo dei Croati
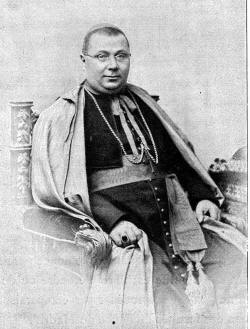
- The then-archbishop Aiuti pictured in 1895.
- Church: Roman Catholic Church
- Appointed: 12 November 1903
- Term ended: 28 April 1905
- Predecessor: Lőrinc Schlauch
- Opposed to: František Salesky Bauer
- Previous posts: Prior General of the Carmelites of Mary Immaculate (1887-91); Apostolic Delegate to East India (1887-91); Titular Archbishop of Acrida (1887-93); Secretary of the Congregation for the Propagation of the Faith (1891-93); Apostolic Nuncio to Bavaria (1893-96); Titular Archbishop of Tamiathis (1893-1903); Apostolic Nuncio to Portugal (1896-1903)

Orders
- Ordination: 22 September 1871
- Consecration: 1 May 1887 by George Porter
- Created cardinal: 22 June 1903 by Pope Leo XIII
- Rank: Cardinal-Priest

Personal details
- Born: Andrea Aiuti; 17 June 1849 Rome, Papal States
- Died: 28 April 1905 (aged 55) Rome, Kingdom of Italy
- Buried: Campo Verano
- Parents: Pietro Aiuti; Teresa Ramella-Ragnina-Leoni
- Education: Pontifical Roman Major Seminary; Pontifical Roman Athenaeum Saint Apollinare

Andrea Aiuti (17 June 1849 – 28 April 1905) was an Italian prelate of the Catholic Church who worked in the diplomatic service of the Holy See and in the Roman Curia. He was made a cardinal in 1903.

== Biography ==
Andrea Aiuti was born in Rome on 17 June 1849 to a patrician family from Trapani. He earned degrees in philosophy and theology at the Pontifical Roman Athenaeum Saint Apollinare.

He was ordained a priest on 22 September 1871.

Aiuti was a member of the Roman Curia on the staff of the Congregation of the Council and then in the diplomatic service at the nunciature in Brazil. He was secretary to Antonio Agliardi who was charged with organizing the Church in India. On 31 March 1887, he was appointed titular archbishop of Achrida and Apostolic Delegate to India. He received his episcopal ordination from the Archbishop of Bombay, George Porter, S.J., on 1 May 1887. He published an account of his years in India in English as a guide for the Catholic hierarchy there.

From 1891 to 1893, he was secretary for Eastern Rite affairs at the Congregation for the Propagation of the Faith. In that role, he contributed to Pope Leo XIII's encyclical on the union of the Christian churches, Satis cognitum (1896).

He was appointed Apostolic Nuncio to Bavaria on 7 June 1893. A few days later, he was appointed Titular Archbishop of Tamiathis. On 15 July 1896, he became Apostolic Nuncio to Portugal.

On 12 November 1903, Pope Leo XIII made him cardinal-priest of San Girolamo dei Croati.

Aiuti participated in the conclave of 1903 that elected Pope Pius X.

He died after a long illness surrounded by his relatives in Rome on 28 April 1905, at the age of 55. He was buried in the family vault in Rome's Campo Verano cemetery.

Diplomatic posts
Preceded by Antonio Agliardi	Apostolic Nuncio to India; 31 March 1887 – 24 July 1891	Succeeded by Wladyslaw Michal Zaleski
Preceded by Antonio Agliardi	Apostolic Nuncio to Bavaria; 16 May 1893 – 15 July 1896	Succeeded by Benedetto Lorenzelli
Preceded by Domenico Jacobini	Apostolic Nuncio to Portugal; 15 July 1896 – 22 June 1903	Succeeded by José Macchi
