= San Girolamo dei Croati =

- St. Jerome of the Croatians (in English); Sancti Hieronymi Croatorum (in Latin)
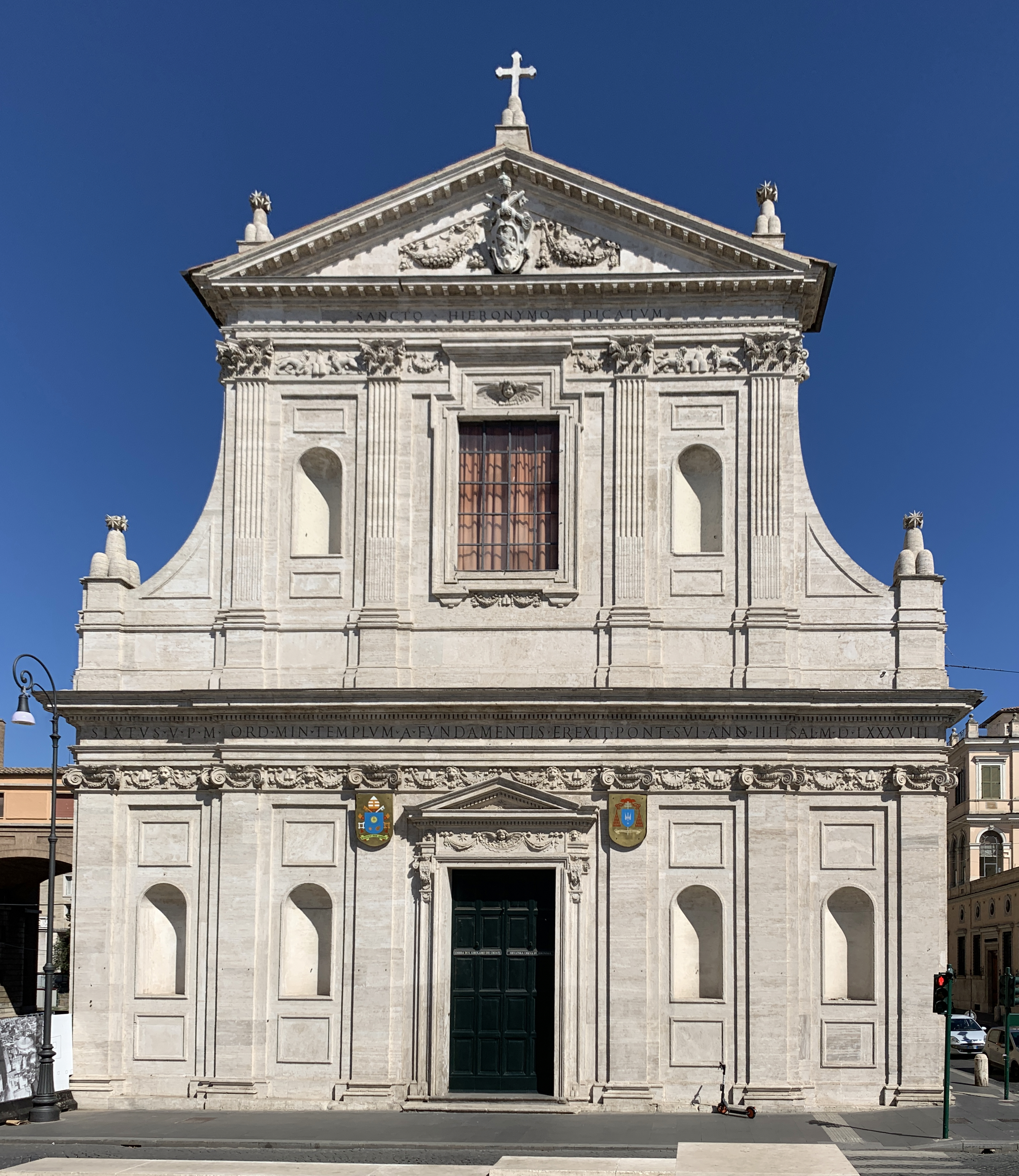
- Saint Jerome of the Croats
- Click on the map for a fullscreen view
- 41°54′18″N 12°28′33″E
- Location: Via Tomacelli 132, Rome
- Country: Italy
- Denomination: Roman Catholic
- Tradition: Roman Rite

History
- Status: Titular church, national church
- Dedication: Jerome
- Consecrated: 1587

Architecture
- Architectural type: Church
- Groundbreaking: 1585
- Completed: 1587

Saint Jerome of the Croats is the national Catholic church of Croatia on Via Tomacelli in the Campus Martius of Rome. It is now a chapel of the Pontifical Croatian College of Saint Jerome in Rome and is only open to visitors by arrangement with the College.

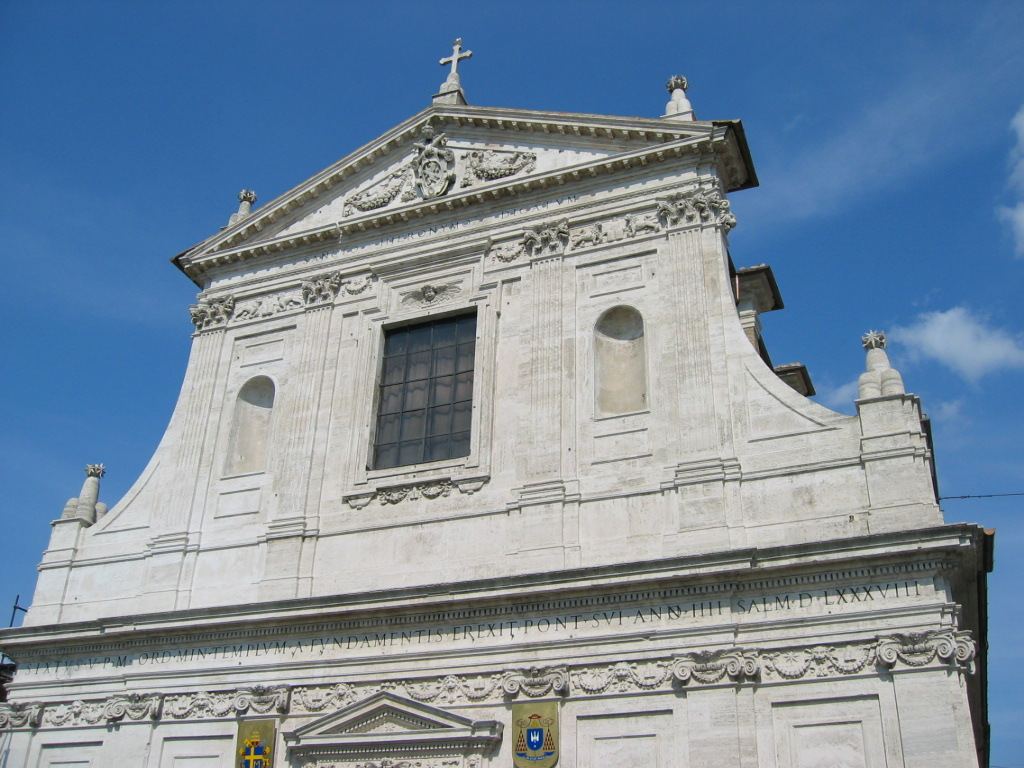
Frontal section

== Name ==
It is also known as "St. Jerome of the Illyrians" (Italian: San Girolamo degli Illirici), and was formerly known as "St. Jerome of the Slavs" (Italian: San Girolamo degli Schiavoni).

== History ==
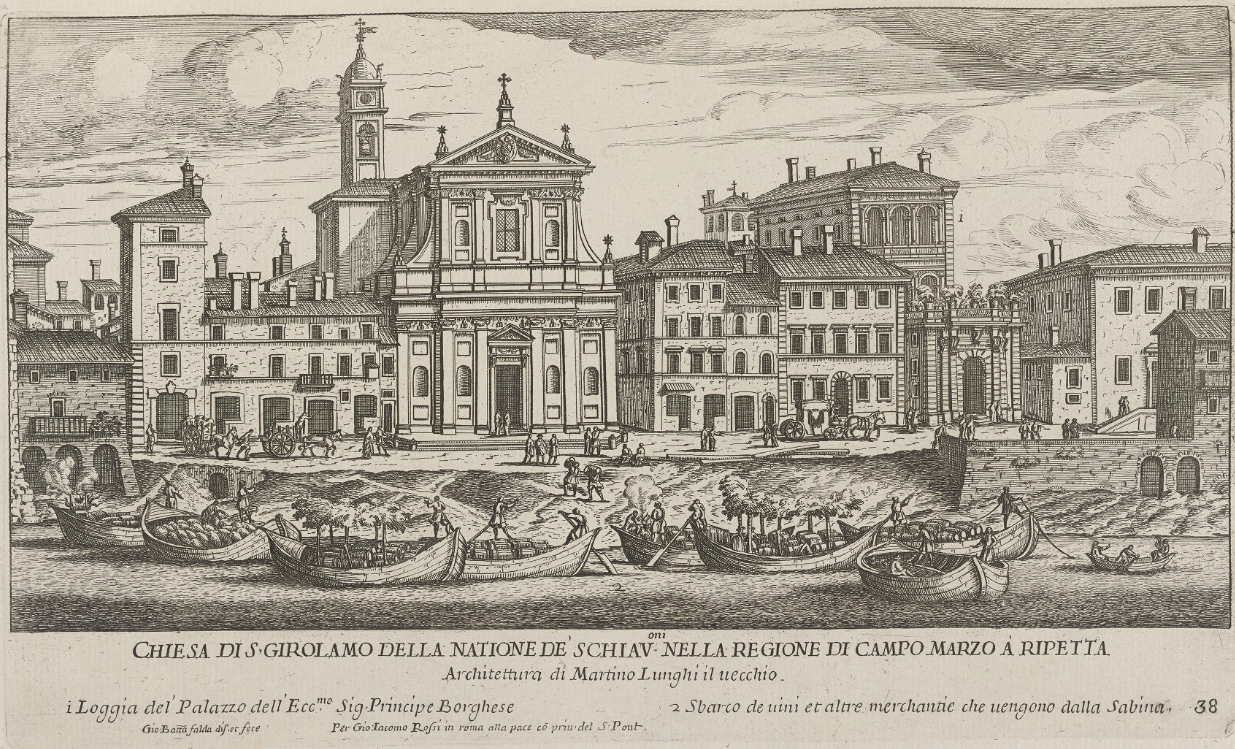
San Girolamo degli Schiavoni in a 1667/69 engraving

It was first built in 1585-1587 for refugees from areas ruled by the Turks, and dedicated to St Jerome, who was from Dalmatia (former Roman Illyricum). The small, ruined church of Santa Marina de Posterula had been given to them in 1453 (the year of the Fall of Constantinople) by Pope Nicholas V, for the construction of a church and hospice. It once faced the port built on the Tiber River, called the Porto di Ripetta.

The confraternity was renamed Congregatio or "Society of St. Jerome" in 1544.

== Architecture ==
Around 1588, Pope Sixtus V, who as Cardinal Montalvo had served as cardinal-protector, commissioned Martino Longhi the Elder to completely rebuild the church and add a bell tower. The late Renaissance façade is of travertine, decorated with the pope’s emblems.

The fresco on the interior cupola was done in a trompe-l'œil effect by Giovanni Guerra around 1590. The Evangelists on the pendentives are by Paolo Guidotti. Andrea Lilio provided frescoes for the transept side vaults. Most of them had previously done work for Sixtus at the Vatican. Frescoes in the nave were completed by Pietro Gagliardi in 1847 from a bequest of Pope Pius IX.

The church underwent restoration in 2018 after the earthquakes of two years prior.

== Burials ==
Early burials took place in the guesthouse cemetery.

- Juraj Barakovic, poet, 1628
- Johannes Lucius, historian, 1679
- Ivan Paštrić, linguist, 1708

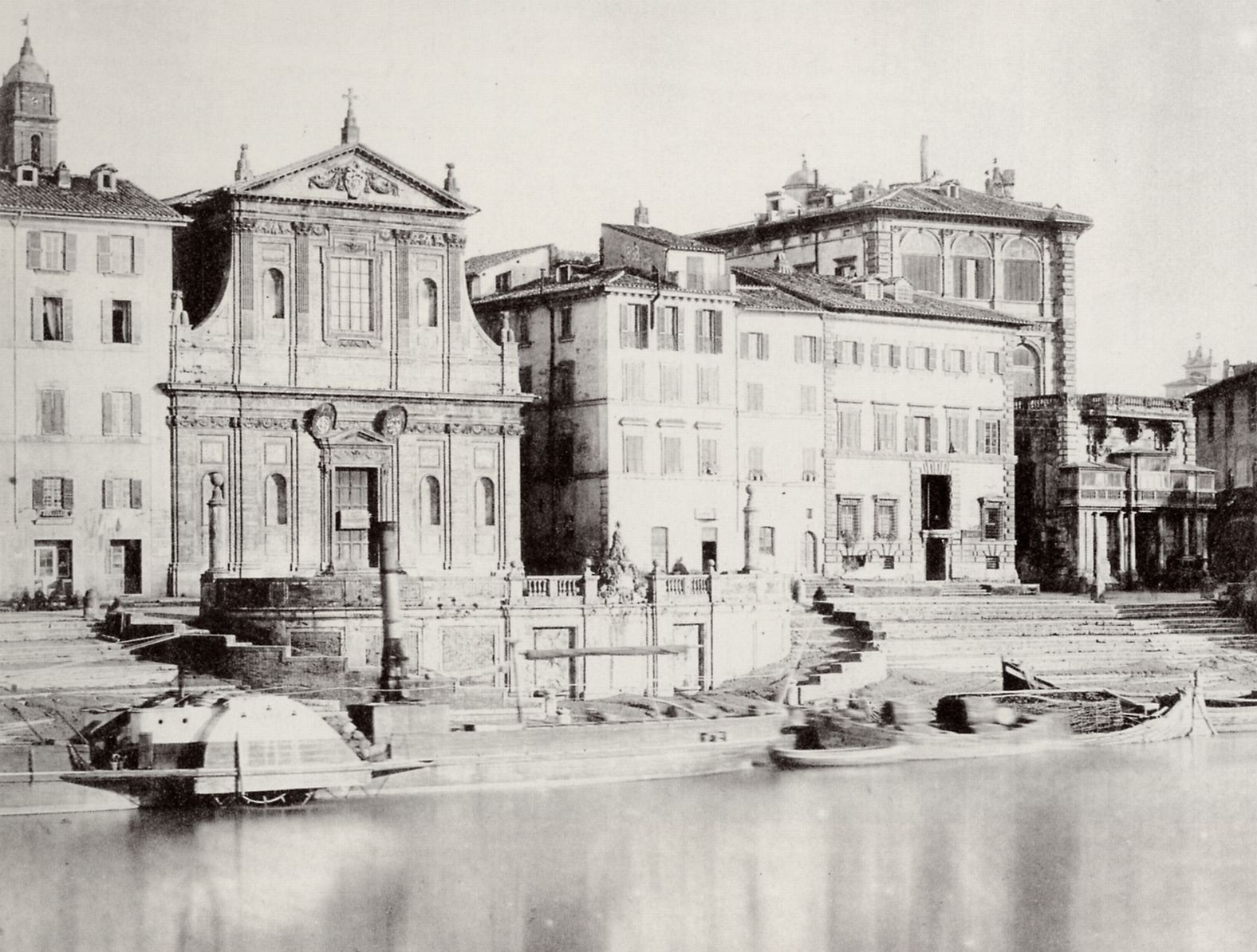
Photograph of the Porto di Ripetta in 1865

== List of Cardinal Protectors ==
- Prospero Santacroce 8 February 1566 - 12 April 1570
- Felice Peretti 9 June 1570 - 24 April 1585
- Alessandro Damasceni Peretti 14 June 1585 - 24 April 1585
- Pedro de Deza 20 April 1587 - 18 August 1597
- Simeone Tagliavia d'Aragonia 18 August 1587 - 21 February 1600
- Felice Centini 12 September 1612 - 12 August 1613
- Matteo Priuli 17 October 1616 - 23 June 1621
- Giovanni Delfino (camerlengo) 23 June 1621 - 23 August 1622
- Péter Pázmány 31 May 1632 - 19 March 1637
- Girolamo Buonvisi 23 April 1657 - 21 February 1670
- Felice Piretti di Montalvo 20 November 1570 - 24 March 1585
- Lipót Kollonics 14 November 1689 - 20 January 1707
- Cornelio Bentivoglio 15 April 1720 - 25 June 1727
- Leandro Porzia 10 May 1728 - 20 September 1728
- Sinibaldo Doria 17 December 1731 - 2 December 1733
- Giacomo Oddi 5 April 1745 - 12 January 1756
- Pietro Paolo Conti 19 November 1759 - 25 March 1763
- Franziskus von Paula Herzan von Harras 11 December 1780 - 13 September 1782
- Francesco Carrara (Cardinal) 11 April 1785 - 11 April 1791
- Cesare Brancadoro 20 July 1801 - 29 May 1820
- Gabriel della Genga Sermattei 21 November 1836 - 10 February 1861
- Antonio Maria Panebianco 30 September 1861 - 23 December 1861
- Giuseppe Andrea Bizzarri 19 March 1863 - 5 July 1875
- Luigi Serafini 20 March 1877 - 1 June 1888
- Serafino Vannutelli 11 February 1889 - 12 June 1893
- Lorinc Schlauch 21 May 1894 - 10 July 1902
- Andrea Aiuti 12 November 1903 - 28 April 1905
- Frantisek Salesky Bauer 2 December 1912 - 25 November 1915
- Raffaele Scapinelli di Leguigno 7 December 1916 - 16 September 1933
- Santiago Luis Copello 19 December 1935 - 14 December 1959
- Gustavo Testa 17 December 1959 - 28 February 1969
- Paolo Bertoli 5 March 1973 - 30 June 1979
- Franjo Kuharić 2 February 1983 - 11 March 2002
- Josip Bozanić 21 October 2003 – present

== Sources ==
- Mariano Armellini, Le chiese di Roma dal secolo IV al XIX, Roma 1891, pp. 328–329
- Christian Hülsen, Le chiese di Roma nel Medio Evo, Firenze 1927, pp. 380–381
- F. Titi, Descrizione delle Pitture, Sculture e Architetture esposte in Roma: San Girolamo degli Illiri, Roma 1763, pp. 396–397
