= Sinibaldo Doria =

Italian cardinal

His Eminence Sinibaldo Doria
- Cardinal, Bishop of Benevento
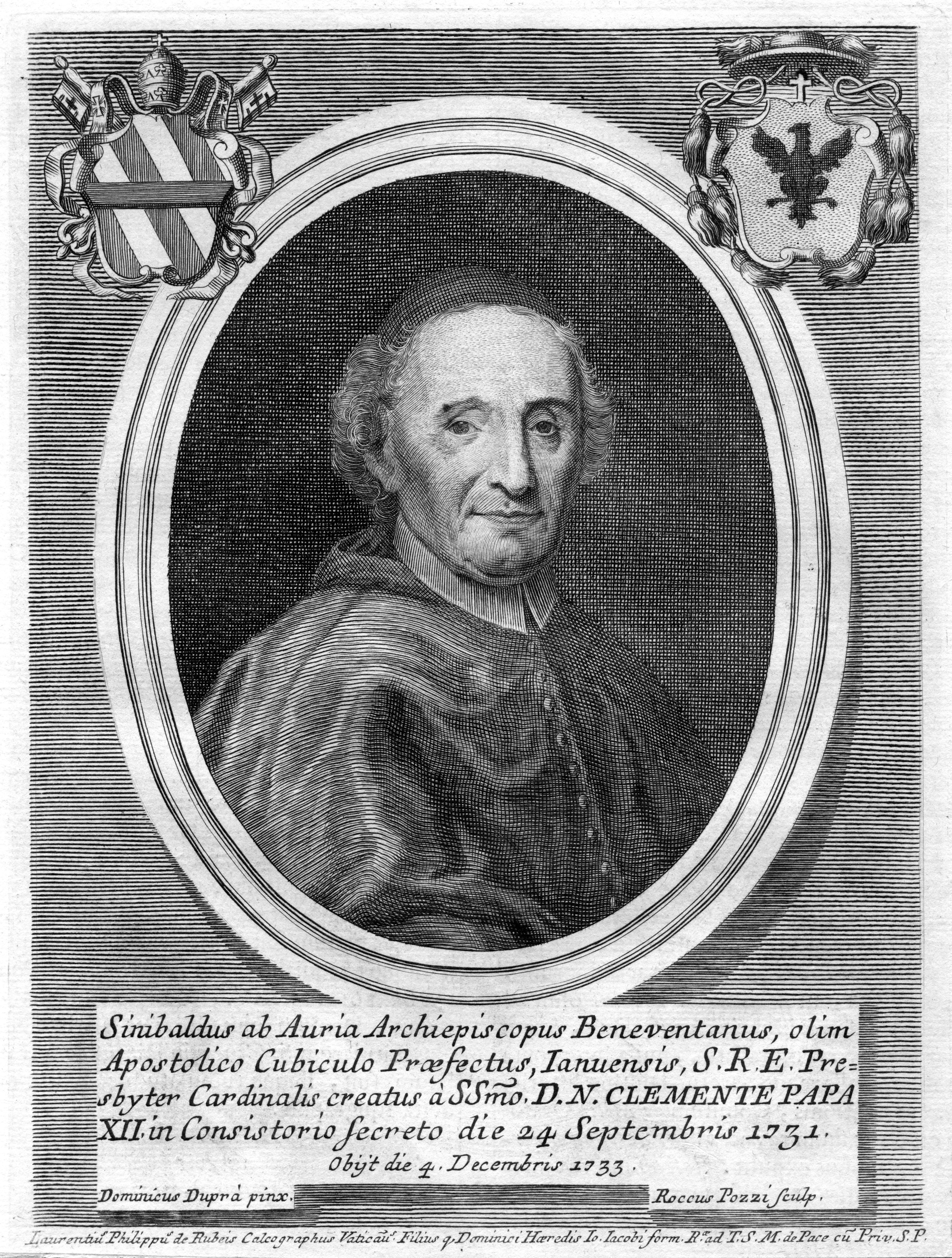
- Church: Catholic Church
- See: Benevento
- Appointed: 21 May 1731
- Term ended: 2 December 1733
- Predecessor: Niccolò Coscia
- Successor: Serafino Cenci
- Other post: Cardinal Priest of San Girolamo dei Croati

Orders
- Consecration: 3 January 1712 (Bishop) by Fabrizio Paolucci
- Created cardinal: 24 September 1731 by Pope Clement XII

Personal details
- Born: 21 September 1664 Genova
- Died: 2 December 1733 (aged 69) Benevento
- Buried: Benevento Cathedral

Sinibaldo Doria (Latin: Sinibaldus ab Auria, 1664 – 1733) was a Catholic cardinal who served as officer of the Papal States and as Bishop of Benevento from 1731 to his death.

== Life ==
Sinibaldo Doria was born in Genova on 21 September 1664 to the noble and rich Doria family. Still a child he moved to Rome where he studied by the Jesuits in the Roman College. He graduated in utroque iure at University of Siena in 1688.

Based in Rome, he took up a career in the administration of the Papal States. On 13 July 1690 he was made Referendary of the Tribunals of the Apostolic Signature of Justice and of Grace, and immediately he was appointed as Governor of Tivoli where in 1691 he successfully faced the cases of plague coming from Naples. He career followed with many appointments as governor of towns: Prelate of Fano on 16 November 1691, Vice-legatus of Ferrara in 1693, Governor of Montalto on 1 August 1695, Governor of Ascoli Piceno in 1698, Governor of Macerata on 3 January 1701.

From 4 November 1706 to 12 November 1711, he was Vice-legate of Avignon. Living in Avignon, he was the governor of such town as well as the financial administrator of all the Comtat Venaissin, an enclave of the Papal States into France. The period was extremely difficult, due to the War of the Spanish Succession in which he was encharged to send secret information to Rome and in Spain. In 1708 he was asked to enlist and send 3000 soldiers in the Papal States. He had to face the open hostility of France who increased the custom duties, as well as the famine in 1709 and 1710 and the floods of the Rhône in 1711.

In 1711, he was appointed Preaceptor (tutor) of Ospedale di Santo Spirito in Sassia, the main hospital of Rome. He was also appointed Titular archbishop of Patras on 18 December 1711. He was consecrated bishop the following 3 January 1712 by the Cardinal Secretary of State Fabrizio Paolucci in the Roman church of Santo Spirito in Sassia. As head of the Ospedale di Santo Spirito in Sassia, he offered four rooms of his apartment to host the Biblioteca Lancisiana, a new founded library focused on medical studies.

In October 1721, he became Master of the Chamber of Pope Innocent XIII, while he was not member of the court of the following Pope, Benedict XIII. On the contrary, Pope Clement XII had a high estimation of him and entrusted him with the difficult task of being the new Bishop of Benevento.

At Benevento, the local Cardinal Niccolò Coscia, who had been a protégé of Benedict XIII and an embezzler, had become bishop. Clement XII appointed Doria in place of Coscia to return the diocese to the normality, but most of the local population supported Coscia who had given them advantages. The local population rose up in revolt and the situation required intervention of the army.

The appointment as Bishop of Benevento occurred on 21 May 1731, and the following 24 September, Sinibaldo Doria was appointed Cardinal Priest of San Girolamo dei Croati. He died in Benevento on 2 December 1733 and was buried in that Cathedral.
