= Luigi Giordani =

Italian prelate

His Eminence Luigi Giordani
- Archbishop of Ferrara
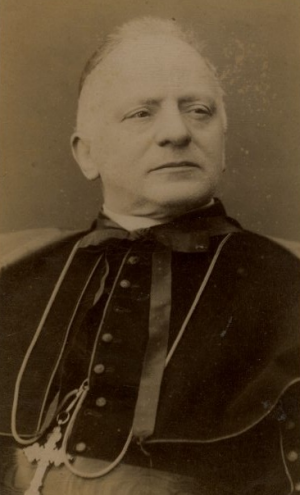
- Church: Roman Catholic Church
- Archdiocese: Ferrara
- See: Ferrara
- Appointed: 22 June 1877
- Term ended: 21 April 1893
- Predecessor: Luigi Vannicelli Casoni
- Successor: Egidio Mauri
- Other post: Cardinal-Priest of Santi Silvestro e Martino ai Monti (1887-93)
- Previous posts: Titular Bishop of Philadelphia in Arabia (1871-77); Auxiliary Bishop of Ferrara (1871-77)

Orders
- Ordination: 19 September 1846 by Ignazio Giovanni Cadolini
- Consecration: 19 March 1871 by Luigi Vannicelli Casoni
- Created cardinal: 14 March 1887 by Pope Leo XIII
- Rank: Cardinal-Priest

Personal details
- Born: Luigi Giordani; 13 October 1822 Santa Maria Codifiume, Argenta, Papal States
- Died: 21 April 1893 (aged 70) Ferrara, Kingdom of Italy
- Buried: Ferrara Cathedral
- Parents: Francesco Giordani; Gertrude Boriani
- Education: Pontifical Academy of Ecclesiastical Nobles

Luigi Giordani (13 October 1822 – 21 April 1893) was an Italian prelate of the Catholic Church who worked as a papal delegate and held positions in the Roman Curia before serving as Archbishop of Ferrara from 1877 until his death in 1893. He was made a cardinal in 1887.

== Biography ==
Luigi Giordani was born on 13 October 1822 in Santa Maria Codifiume in Argenta in Emilia-Romagna.

He studied at the seminaries of Ferrara and Bologna, earning a doctorate in theology. He later obtained a doctorate in law in Rome and then studied diplomacy at the Pontifical Academy of Ecclesiastical Nobles. He was ordained a priest on 19 September 1846.

He was the pope's delegate to several cities in the Papal States, including Ascoli Piceno in December 1852, where he managed relief services during the cholera epidemic, Velletri in 1856, and Perugia in 1859. Within the Roman Curia, he became a counselor of the Sacred Consulta of Finances in 1859 and a member of the Apostolic Chamber in 1863. He was also an auditor of the Sacred Roman Rota for four years.

He was appointed titular bishop of Philadelphia in Arabia on 6 March 1871 and received his episcopal consecration on 19 March 1871 from Cardinal Luigi Vannicelli Casoni, archbishop of Ferrara. He was named auxiliary of Ferrara in July 1872 and became vicar capitular of Ferrara upon the death of Cardinal Casoni on 21 April 1877. He was named Archbishop of Ferrara on 22 June 1877.

Pope Leo XIII made him a cardinal priest on 14 March 1887. Giordani received his red biretta and was assigned the title of Santi Silvestro e Martino ai Monti on 17 March 1887.

He died on 21 April 1893 in Ferrara and was buried in the Certosa of Ferrara.
