= Johannes Katschthaler =

Austrian Cardinal

His Eminence Johannes Baptist Katschthaler
- Cardinal Archbishop of Salzburg
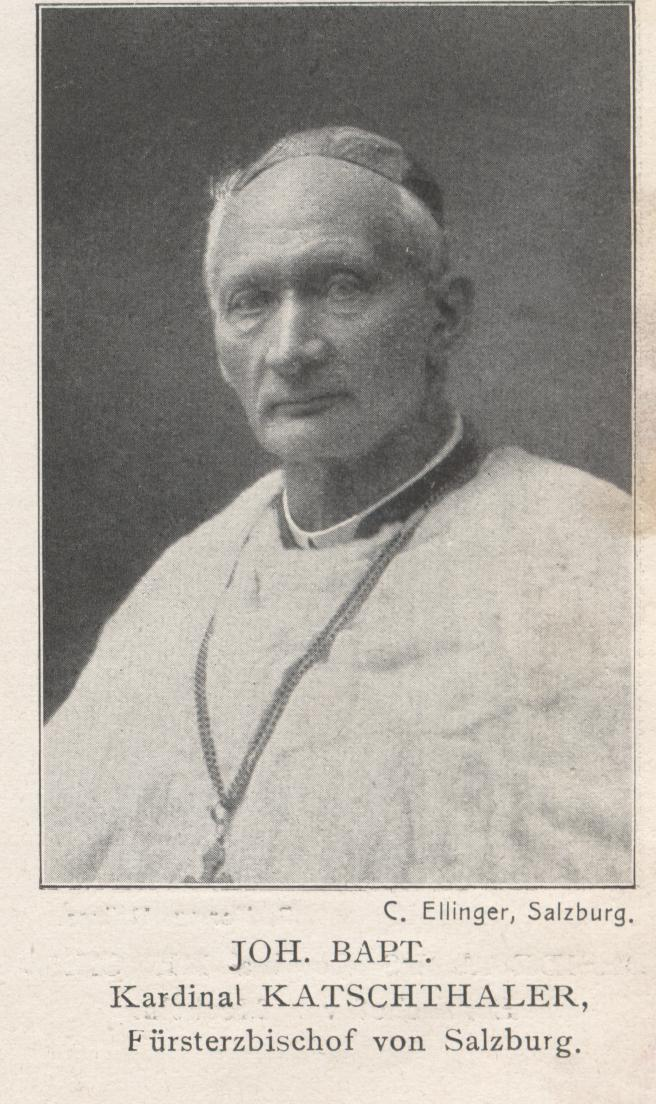
- Church: Roman Catholic
- Archdiocese: Salzburg
- Appointed: 10 May 1900
- Installed: 13 January 1901
- Term ended: 27 February 1914
- Predecessor: Johannes Evangelist Haller
- Successor: Balthasar Kaltner
- Other post: Cardinal-Priest of San Tommaso in Parione (1903-14)
- Previous post: Auxiliary Bishop of Salzburg (1891-1900)

Orders
- Ordination: 31 July 1855
- Consecration: 12 July 1891 by Johannes Evangelist Haller
- Created cardinal: 22 June 1903 by Pope Leo XIII

Personal details
- Born: Johannes Katschthaler; 29 May 1832 Hippach, Austrian Empire
- Died: 27 February 1914 (aged 81) Salzburg, Austria-Hungary
- Coat of arms

Styles of Johannes Katschthaler
- Reference style: His Eminence
- Spoken style: Your Eminence
- Informal style: Cardinal
- See: Salzburg

Johannes Baptist Katschthaler (29 May 1832—27 February 1914) was an Austrian Cardinal of the Catholic Church. He served as Archbishop of Salzburg from 1900 until his death, and was elevated to the cardinalate in 1903.

== Biography ==
Johannes Katschthaler was born in Hippach, in the Austrian Tirol, and studied at the seminary in Salzburg. He was ordained to the priesthood on 31 July 1855, and became vicar of Rossen in 1857. After being made vicar of St. Johann, he began teaching at the Salzburg seminary. Katschthaler furthered his studies at the University of Salzburg, from where he obtained his doctorate in theology, and later joined the Theological Faculty at the same university on 1 May 1862. He began teaching ecclesiastical history at University of Innsbruck in 1874, and became a canon of the cathedral chapter of Salzburg in 1880. He was promoted to rector of seminary of Salzburg in 1882.

On 4 June 1891 Katschthaler was appointed Auxiliary Bishop of Salzburg and Titular Bishop of Cybistra by Pope Leo XIII, receiving his episcopal consecration on the following July 12 from Archbishop Johannes Evangelist Haller. After becoming dean of the metropolitan chapter of Salzburg in 1892, he was later elected the seventy-fourth Archbishop of Salzburg by the cathedral chapter on 10 May 1900, being confirmed by Pope Leo on the following 17 December. In virtue of his new position, Katschthaler also held the title of Primas Germaniae.

Leo XIII created him Cardinal Priest of San Tommaso in Parione in the consistory of 22 June 1903. However, as a privilege of his see, Katschthaler was already allowed to wear the scarlet robes traditionally reserved for cardinals even before his elevation to cardinal. During his tenure, he participated in the papal conclave of 1903, which elected Pope Pius X, and promoted the Theological Faculty of Salzburg to form a separate University. In 1911, he was decorated with the Grand Cross of the Austrian Order of Sankt Stefan.

He died in Salzburg, at age 81. He is buried in the metropolitan cathedral of Salzburg.

Catholic Church titles
Preceded by Johann Evangelist Haller	Archbishop Salzburg; 1900–1914	Succeeded by Balthasar Kaltner
