= Egidio Mauri =

Italian cardinal

His Eminence Egidio Mauri O.P.
- Archbishop of Ferrara
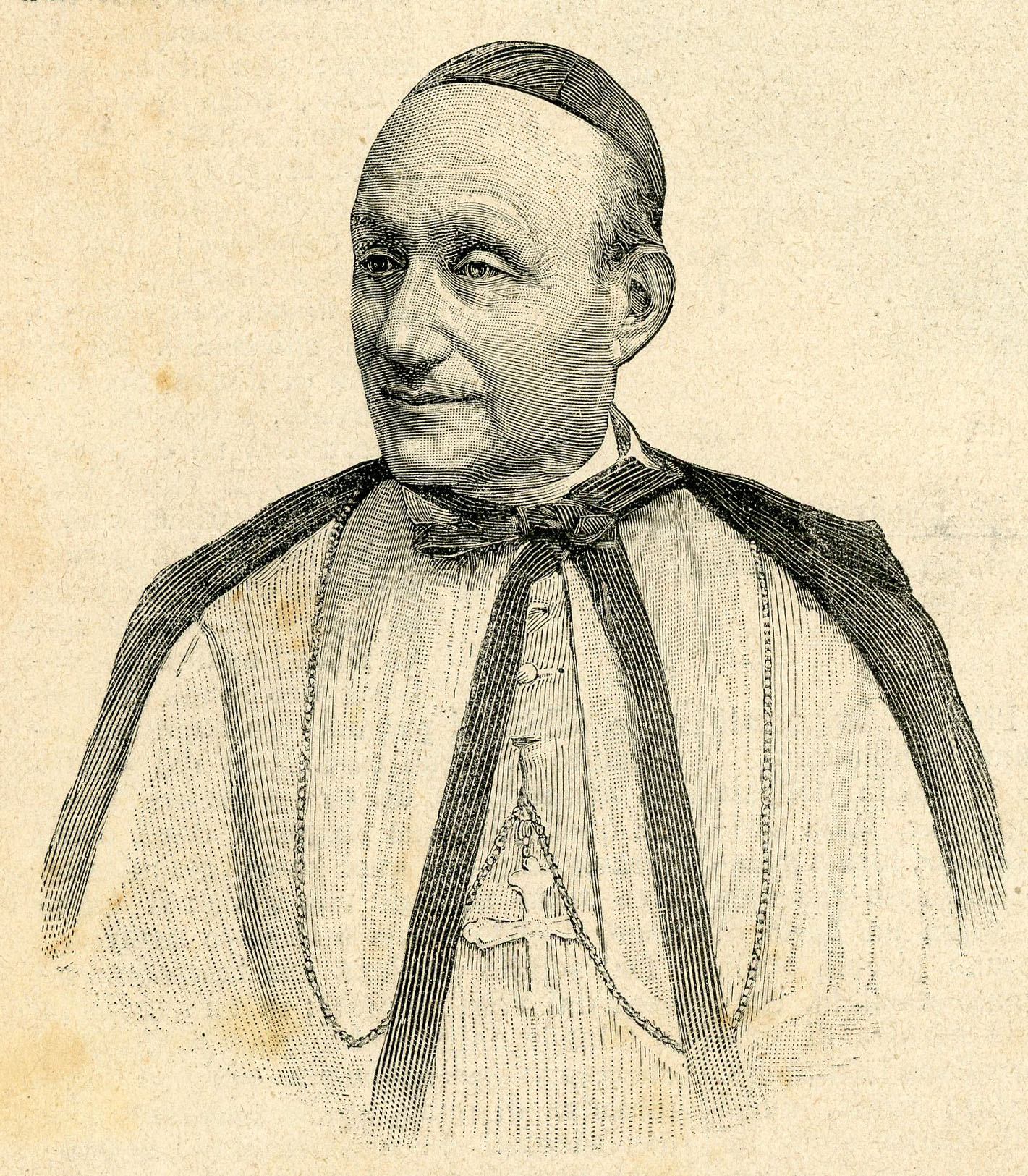
- Church: Roman Catholic Church
- Archdiocese: Ferrara
- See: Ferrara
- Appointed: 12 June 1893
- Term ended: 13 March 1896
- Predecessor: Luigi Giordani
- Successor: Pietro Respighi
- Other post: Cardinal-Priest of Santa Maria sopra Minerva (1895-96)
- Previous posts: Bishop of Rieti (1871-88); Bishop of Cingoli (1888-93); Bishop of Osimo (1888-93); Cardinal-Priest of San Bartolomeo all'Isola (1894-95)

Orders
- Ordination: 24 September 1853
- Consecration: 14 January 1872 by Filippo Maria Guidi
- Created cardinal: 18 May 1894 by Pope Leo XIII
- Rank: Cardinal-Priest

Personal details
- Born: Egidio Mauri; 9 December 1828 Montefiascone, Papal States
- Died: 13 March 1896 (aged 67) Ferrara, Kingdom of Italy

Egidio Mauri (9 December 1828 – 13 March 1896) was an Italian cardinal, since 1893 Archbishop of Ferrara, member of the Dominican Order.

He was born as Giovanni Mauri in Montefiscone; his brother was a priest, and when he died, Giovanni changed his name to Egidio and joined the Order of Preachers at Viterbo. He was ordained on September 24, 1853; he was elected bishop of Rieti, December 22, 1871 and was created cardinal priest in the consistory of May 18, 1894.

He is buried at the metropolitan cathedral of Ferrara.
