= Lőrinc Schlauch =

Hungarian Roman Catholic cardinal and archbishop

His Eminence Lőrinc Schlauch
- Bishop of Oradea Mare
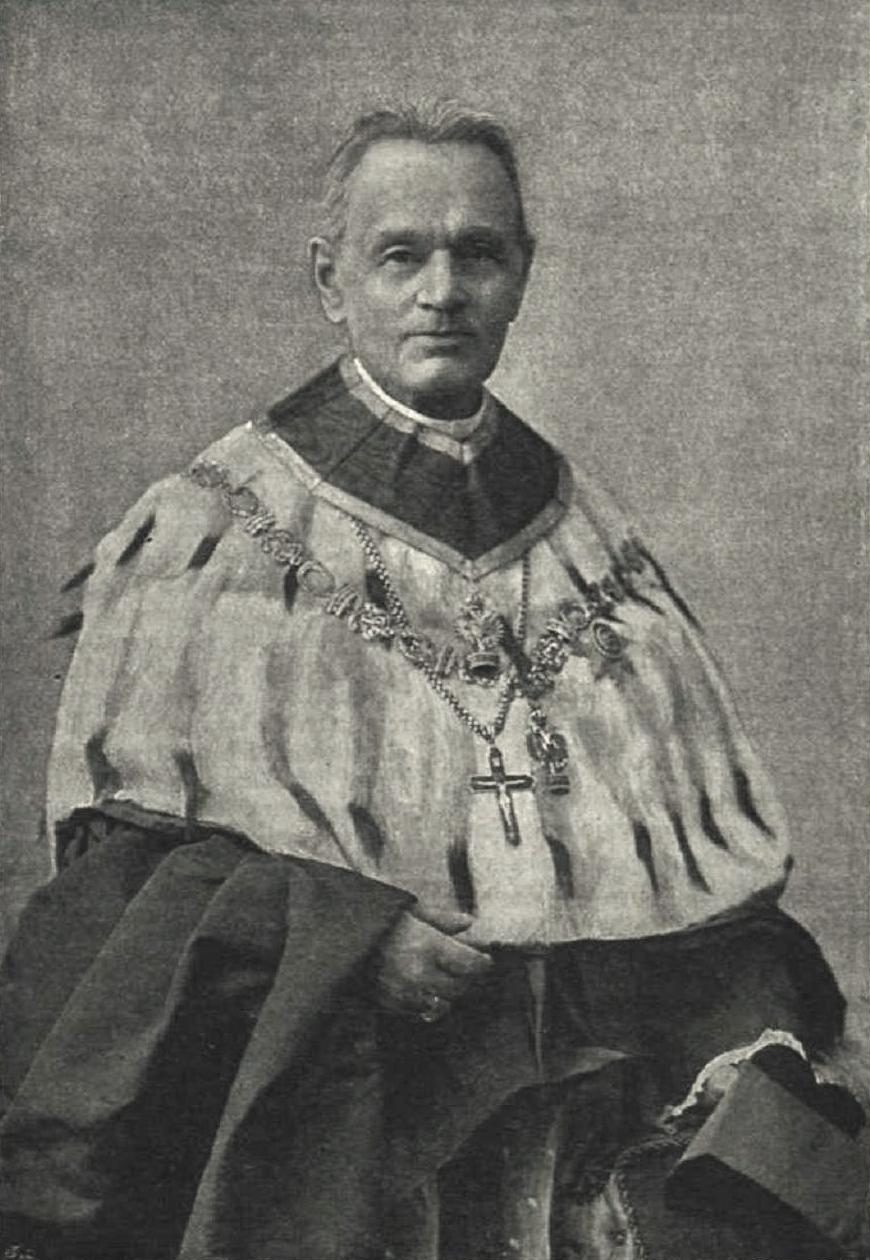
- Cardinal Schlauch pictured in 1902.
- Church: Roman Catholic Church
- Diocese: Oradea Mare
- See: Oradea Mare
- Appointed: 26 May 1887
- Installed: 24 August 1897
- Term ended: 10 July 1902
- Predecessor: Arnold Ipolyi-Stummer
- Successor: Pavol Szmrecsányi
- Other post: Cardinal-Priest of San Girolamo dei Croati (1894-1902)
- Previous post: Bishop of Satu Mare (1873-87)

Orders
- Ordination: 3 April 1847 by József Krivinai Lonovich
- Consecration: 21 September 1873 by János Simor
- Created cardinal: 12 June 1893 by Pope Leo XIII
- Rank: Cardinal-Priest

Personal details
- Born: Lőrinc Schlauch; 27 March 1824 Uj-Arad, Kingdom of Hungary
- Died: 10 July 1902 (aged 78) Nagyvárad, Bihor, Kingdom of Romania
- Parents: Pal Schlauch; Katharina Jost
- Education: University of Budapest
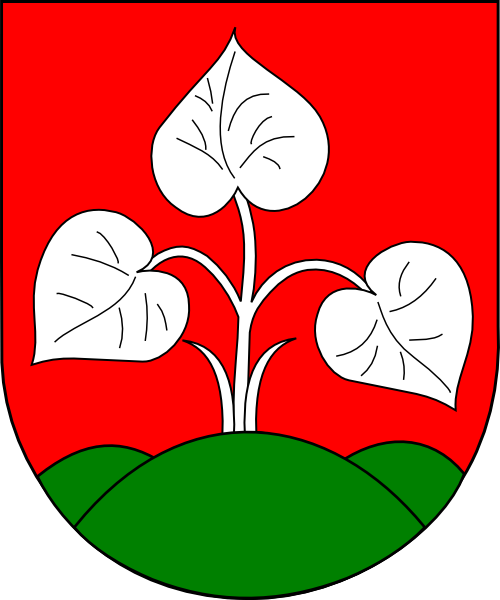
- Coat of arms

Lőrinc Schlauch (27 March 1824 – 10 July 1902) was a Hungarian Roman Catholic cardinal and archbishop during 19th and 20th century.

He was born in Arad in the Banat region of the Austrian Empire and was a son of Lorenz von Linden. He was appointed as a chaplain in 1847 and from 25 July 1873 to 26 May 1886, he was bishop of the Szatmárnémeti diocese.

He was created a cardinal in the consistory on 12 June 1893 by Pope Leo XIII with the title of San Girolamo dei Croati. From 1886 until his death in Nagyvárad in 1902, he served as bishop of the Nagyvárad diocese.

== See also ==
- Cardinals created by Pope Leo XIII
