= Johannes Evangelist Haller =

Austrian-Hungarian prelate

His Eminence Johannes Evangelist Haller
- Archbishop of Salzburg
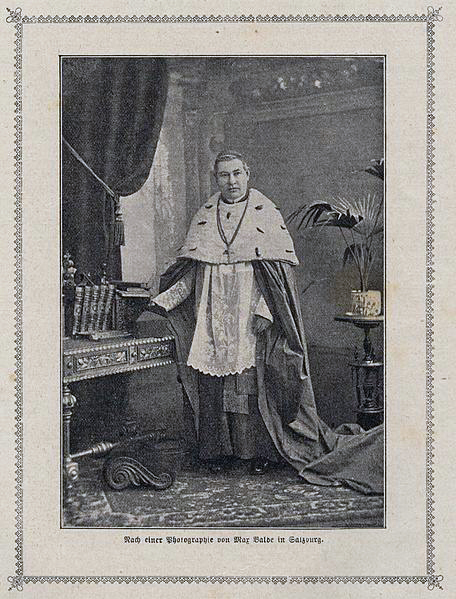
- Cardinal Haller in 1895.
- Church: Roman Catholic Church
- Archdiocese: Salzburg
- See: Salzburg
- Appointed: 26 June 1890
- Installed: 10 August 1890
- Term ended: 5 May 1900
- Predecessor: Franz de Paula Albert Eder
- Successor: Johannes Katschthaler
- Other post: Cardinal-Priest of San Bartolomeo all'Isola (1896-1900)
- Previous posts: Titular Bishop of Adraha (1874-90); Auxiliary Bishop of Trento (1874-90)

Orders
- Ordination: 21 May 1848 by Johann Nepomuk von Tschiderer zu Gleitheim
- Consecration: 14 October 1874 by Maximilian Joseph von Tarnóczy
- Created cardinal: 29 November 1895 by Pope Leo XIII
- Rank: Cardinal Priest

Personal details
- Born: Johannes Evangelist Haller; 30 April 1825 Sankt Martin in Passeier, South Tyrol, Austrian Empire (modern-Italy)
- Died: 5 May 1900 (aged 75) Salzburg, Austria-Hungary
- Buried: Salzburg Cathedral
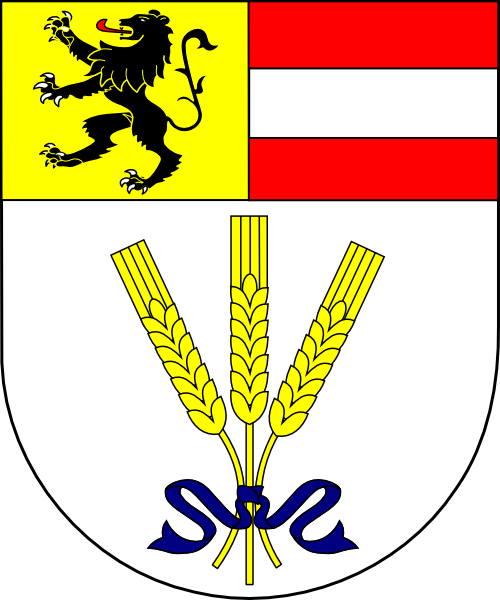
- Coat of arms

Johannes Evangelist Haller (30 April 1825 – 5 May 1900) was an Austrian-Hungarian prelate of the Catholic Church who was Archbishop of Salzburg from 1890 until his death. He was made a cardinal in 1896.

== Biography ==
Johannes Evangelist Haller was born on 30 April 1825 in St. Martin in Passeier in the South Tyrol, then within the Austria-Hungarian Empire and now in Italy. His father was a farmer. He went to school in Meran and Innsbruck and studied philosophy and theology at the seminary in Trento. On 21 May 1848 he was ordained a priest in Trento. He earned a doctorate in theology and worked as chaplain and parish vicar until 1860 when he became a chaplain at Säben Abbey. He was later pastor in Laion. From 1871 to 1874 he was episcopal vicar for the German-speaking part of the Diocese of Trento.

On 14 August 1874, Haller was appointed titular bishop of Adraa and auxiliary bishop of Trento. He received his episcopal consecration on 14 October 1874 in Salzburg from Archbishop Maximilian Joseph von Tarnóczy. He came into conflict with local authorities by opposing government supervision of educational institutions, and the government opposed his appointment as bishop of Trento despite his nomination by local church authorities following vacancies in 1879 and again in 1886.

On 20 December 1880, Haller was appointed auxiliary bishop in Salzburg, where he was appointed cathedral provost. On 20 May 1890, the Salzburg cathedral chapter elected Haller to serve as Archbishop of Salzburg, where his title was Prince-Archbishop. Pope Leo XIII confirmed the election on 26 June 1890, elevated him to cardinal on 29 November 1895, and assigned him the title of Cardinal Priest of San Bartolomeo all'Isola on 25 June 1896.

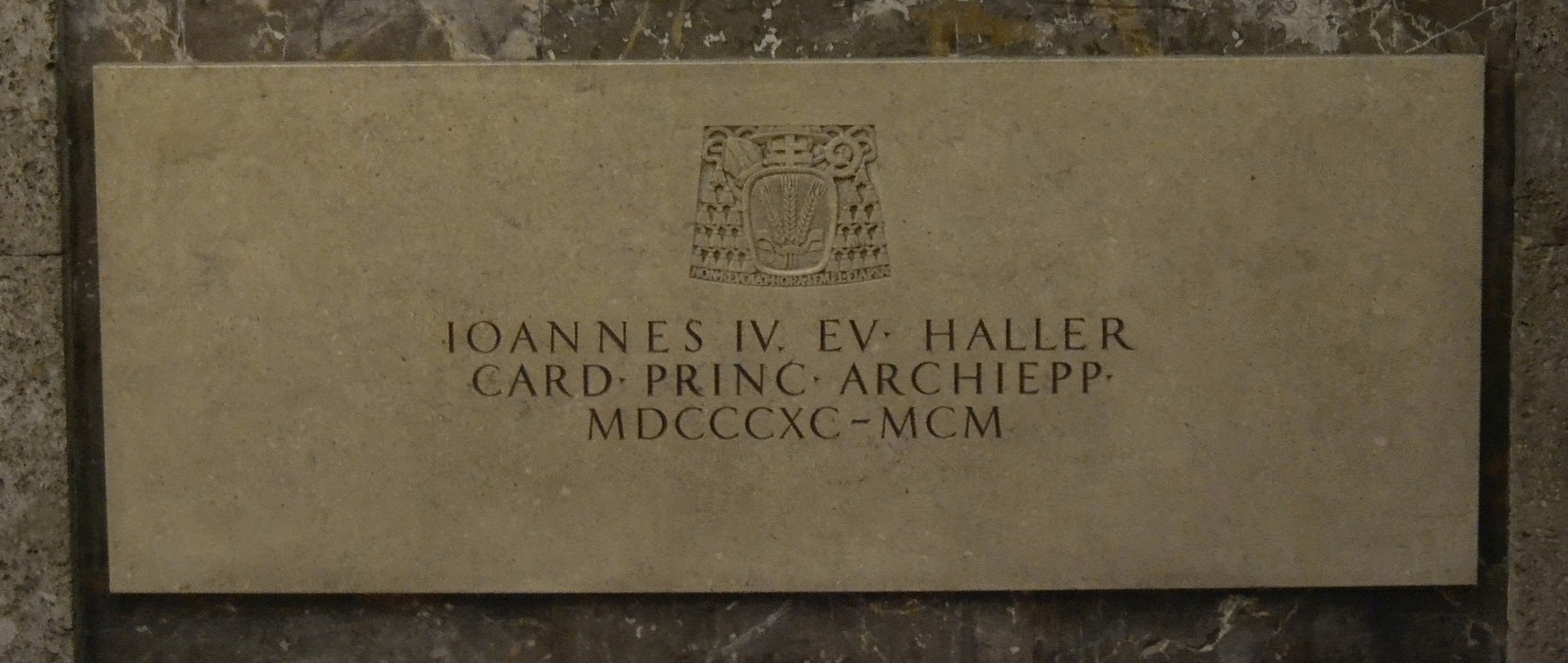
Haller's memorial in the crypt of the Salzburg Cathedral

Haller founded the Johanneum seminary in Meran and developed plans for a Catholic University of Salzburg. He oversaw the 1897 revision of the Austrian catechism.

He died in Salzburg on 5 May 1900 and was buried in the crypt of the Salzburg Cathedral.

Religious titles
Preceded by Franz de Paula Albert Eder	Archbishop of Salzburg; 1890–1900	Succeeded by Johannes Katschthaler
