= Domenico Jacobini =

Italian cardinal (1837–1900)

His Eminence Domenico Maria Jacobini
- Vicar General of Rome
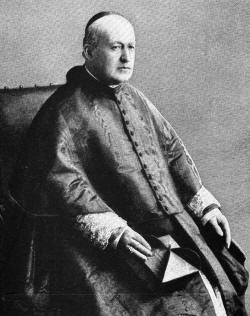
- Church: Roman Catholic Church
- Appointed: 14 December 1899
- Term ended: 1 February 1900
- Predecessor: Lucido Maria Parocchi
- Successor: Pietro Respighi
- Other post: Cardinal-Priest of Santi Marcellino e Pietro (1896–1900)
- Previous posts: Secretary of the Congregation for Extraordinary Ecclesiastical Affairs (1879–80); Pro-Librarian of the Vatican Apostolic Library (1880–82); Titular Archbishop of Tyrus (1881–96); Secretary of the Congregation of the Propagation of the Faith (1882–91); Apostolic Nuncio to Portugal (1891–96); Camerlengo of the College of Cardinals (1897–98)

Orders
- Consecration: 14 August 1881 by Edoardo Borromeo
- Created cardinal: 22 June 1896 by Pope Leo XIII
- Rank: Cardinal-Priest

Personal details
- Born: Domenico Maria Jacobini; 3 September 1837 Rome, Papal States
- Died: 1 February 1900 (aged 62) Rome, Kingdom of Italy
- Buried: Campo Verano
- Parents: Giovanni Jacobini; Teresa Paini
- Education: Roman Seminary
- Coat of arms

Styles of Giovanni Jacobini
- Reference style: His Eminence
- Spoken style: Your Eminence
- Informal style: Cardinal
- See: Rome (vicariate)

Domenico Maria Jacobini (3 September 1837 – 1 February 1900) was an Italian Cardinal of the Roman Catholic Church. He served as Vicar General of Rome from 1899 until his death, and was elevated to the cardinalate in 1896.

== Biography ==
Domenico Jacobini was born in Rome, and received the Sacrament of Confirmation on 9 March 1845. He studied at the Pontifical Roman Seminary, from where he obtained his doctorates in philosophy (10 September 1856), in theology (12 September 1860), and in civil and canon law (28 June 1863).

After his ordination to the priesthood, Jacobini was made an official of the Sacred Congregation for the Propagation of the Faith on 28 November 1866. He later became professor of Greek (21 August 1868) and prefect of studies (19 November 1880) at the Pontifical Roman Seminary, and Substitute (or deputy) of the Secretariat of Apostolic Briefs on 1 June 1874. Jacobini was raised to the rank of Domestic Prelate of His Holiness on 2 August 1877 and was named Secretary of the Sacred Congregation for Extraordinary Ecclesiastical Affairs on 19 September 1879. As Secretary, he essentially served as the head of that dicastery, as the Pope nominally held the title of Prefect.

He was made a canon of St. Peter's Basilica after becoming Vice-Librarian of the Holy Roman Church on 16 November 1880. He was also named prefect of studies of the Pontifical Roman Athenaeum "S. Apollinare" two days later, on 18 November.

On 4 August 1881 Jacobini was appointed Titular Archbishop of Tyrus by Pope Leo XIII. He received his episcopal consecration on the following August 14 from Cardinal Edoardo Borromeo, with Archbishops Alessandro Sanminiatelli Zabarella and Francesco Folicaldi serving as co-consecrators, at the altar of the Chair of Saint Peter. Jacobini was later named Secretary of the Sacred Congregation for the Propagation of the Faith on 30 March 1882 and Nuncio to Portugal on 16 June 1891.

Pope Leo created him Cardinal Priest of Santi Marcellino e Pietro in the consistory of 22 June 1896 and he ceased to serve as Nuncio. Jacobini was Camerlengo of the Sacred College of Cardinals from 19 April 1897 to 24 March 1898, and was appointed Vicar General of Rome on 14 December 1899. As Vicar General, the Cardinal handled the daily administration of the diocese on behalf of the Bishop of Rome.

Jacobini died in Rome, at age 62. The Pope who received the news while giving audience to the Piedmontese pilgrims was deeply moved and returned hastily to his private apartments. After being exposed in the basilica of Ss. XII Apostoli, his body was buried in his family's tomb at the Campo Verano cemetery.

Preceded by Annibale Capalti	Secretary of the Sacred Congregation for Propagation of the Faith; 1882–1891	Succeeded by Ignazio Persico, OFM Cap
Preceded by Girolamo Maria Gotti, OCD	Camerlengo of the Sacred College of Cardinals; 1897–1898	Succeeded by Antonio Agliardi
Preceded by Lucido Parocchi	Vicar General of Rome; 1899–1900	Succeeded by Pietro Respighi
