= Pietro Respighi =

Italian Catholic Cardinal (1843–1913)

His Eminence Pietro Respighi
- Vicar General of Rome
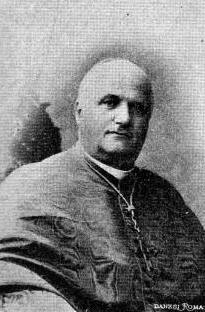
- Respighi circa 1895.
- Diocese: Rome
- See: Rome
- Appointed: 9 April 1900
- Predecessor: Domenico Maria Jacobini
- Successor: Basilio Pompili
- Other posts: Cardinal-Priest of Santi Quattro Coronati (1899–1913); Archpriest of the Basilica of Saint John Lateran (1910–13)
- Previous posts: Bishop of Guastalla (1891–96); Archbishop of Ferrara (1896–1900); Camerlengo of the College of Cardinals (1906–07)

Orders
- Ordination: 31 March 1866 by Lucido Parocchi
- Consecration: 20 December 1891 by Lucido Maria Parocchi
- Created cardinal: 19 June 1899 by Pope Leo XIII
- Rank: Cardinal-Priest

Personal details
- Born: Pietro Respighi; 22 September 1843 Bologna, Papal States
- Died: 22 March 1913 (aged 69) Rome, Kingdom of Italy
- Parents: Giovanni Battista Respighi; Modesta Tinelli

Styles of Pietro Respighi
- Reference style: His Eminence
- Spoken style: Your Eminence
- Religious style: Cardinal
- Posthumous style: not applicable
- Informal style: Cardinal
- See: Ferrara

Pietro Respighi S.T.D. JUD (22 September 1843 – 22 March 1913) was an Italian Catholic prelate who served as Archpriest of the Basilica of Saint John Lateran and vicar general of Rome. He was made a cardinal in 1899.

== Biography ==
He was born in Bologna, the son of a mathematics professor at the University of Bologna. His nephew was Monsignor Carlo Respighi. Respighi studied philosophy with Battaglini, who later became archbishop of Bologna.

He received the sacrament of confirmation in November 1850. He was educated in the Seminary of Bologna and the Pio Roman Seminary in Rome, earning doctorates in theology, civil and canon law in 1870. Ordained to the priesthood on the last day of March 1866 in Rome, he afterwards worked in the Archdiocese of Bologna as professor of Sacred Liturgy and Christian Archology of its seminary from 1872 to June 1874. He was appointed as Archpriest of Santi Gervasio e Protasio parish until 1891.

Pope Leo XIII appointed him Bishop of Guastalla on 14 December 1891. He was appointed to the see of Ferrara in 1896. As Archbishop of Ferrara, he was created Cardinal-Priest of Santi Quattro Coronati in the consistory of 19 June 1899. He resigned pastoral government of the archdiocese of Ferrara on 19 April 1900. On the death of Pope Leo XIII, he participated in the conclave of 1903 that elected Pope Pius X. He was Camerlengo of the Sacred College of Cardinals from 1906 until 1907, and in 1910 he was appointed Archpriest of the Patriarchal Lateran basilica, a position he held until his death three years later.

== Notes and references ==
Catholic Church titles
Preceded by Domenico Jacobini	Vicar General of Rome; 9 April 1900 – 22 March 1913	Succeeded by Basilio Pompili
Preceded by Francesco Satolli	Archpriest of the Basilica of St. John Lateran; 10 January 1910 – 22 March 1913	Succeeded by Domenico Ferrata
