= Sant'Eustachio =

Roman Catholic basilica, a landmark of Rome, Italy

- Basilica of Saint Eustace
- Basilica di Sant'Eustachio
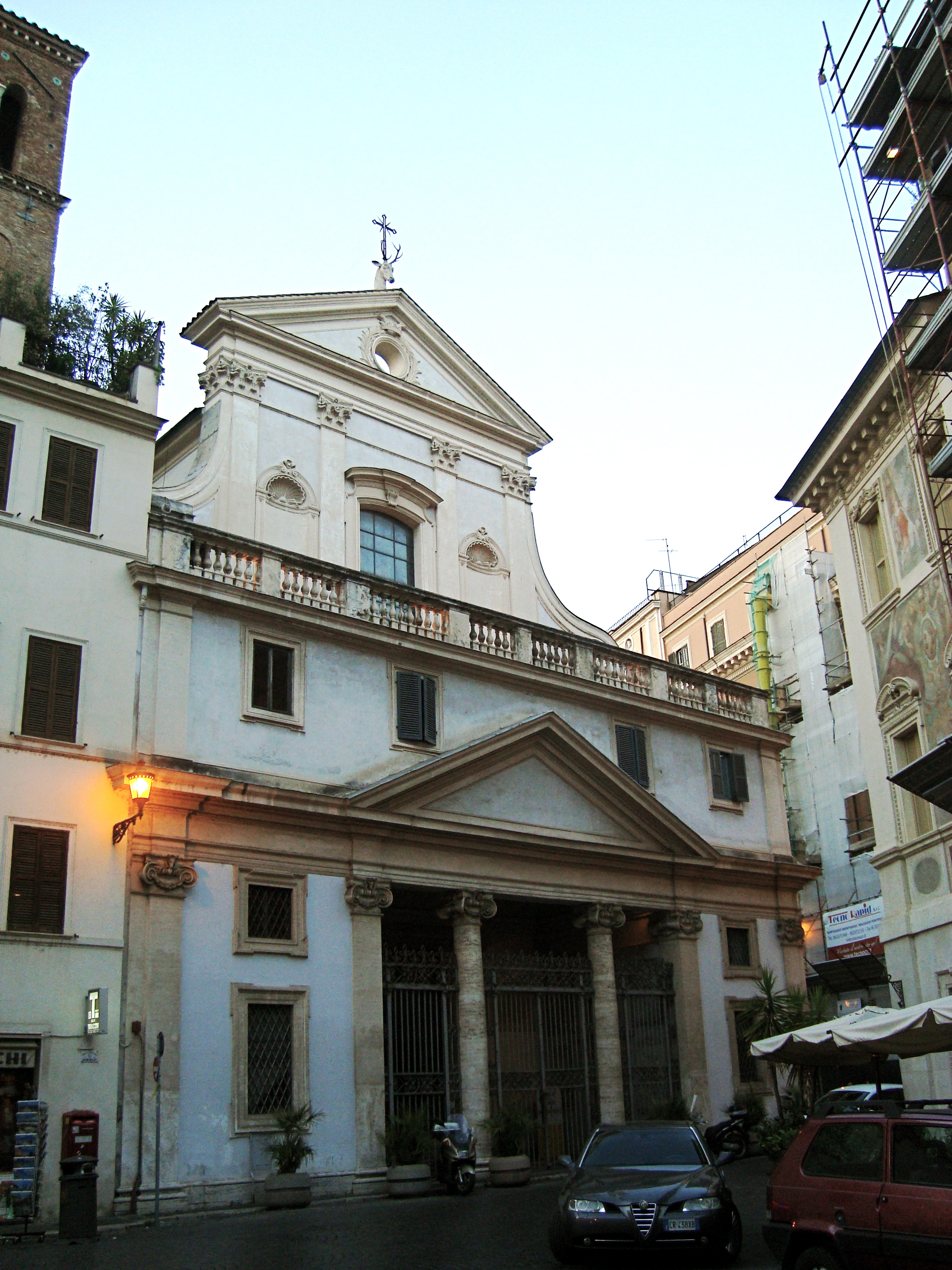
- View of the Basilica Sant'Eustachio
- Click on the map for a fullscreen view
- 41°53′55″N 12°28′33″E
- Location: Via di Sant'Eustachio, Rome
- Country: Italy
- Language: Italian
- Denomination: Catholic

History
- Status: Minor basilica, titular church
- Founded: by the 8th century AD
- Dedication: Saint Eustace

Architecture
- Architectural type: Romanesque, Baroque

Administration
- Diocese: Rome

Sant'Eustachio ([santeuˈstaːkjo]) is a Roman Catholic titular church and minor basilica in Rome, named for the martyr Saint Eustace. It is located on Via di Sant'Eustachio in the rione Sant'Eustachio, a block west of the Pantheon and via della Rotonda, and a block east of Sant'Ivo alla Sapienza and the Via della Dogana Vecchia.

== History ==
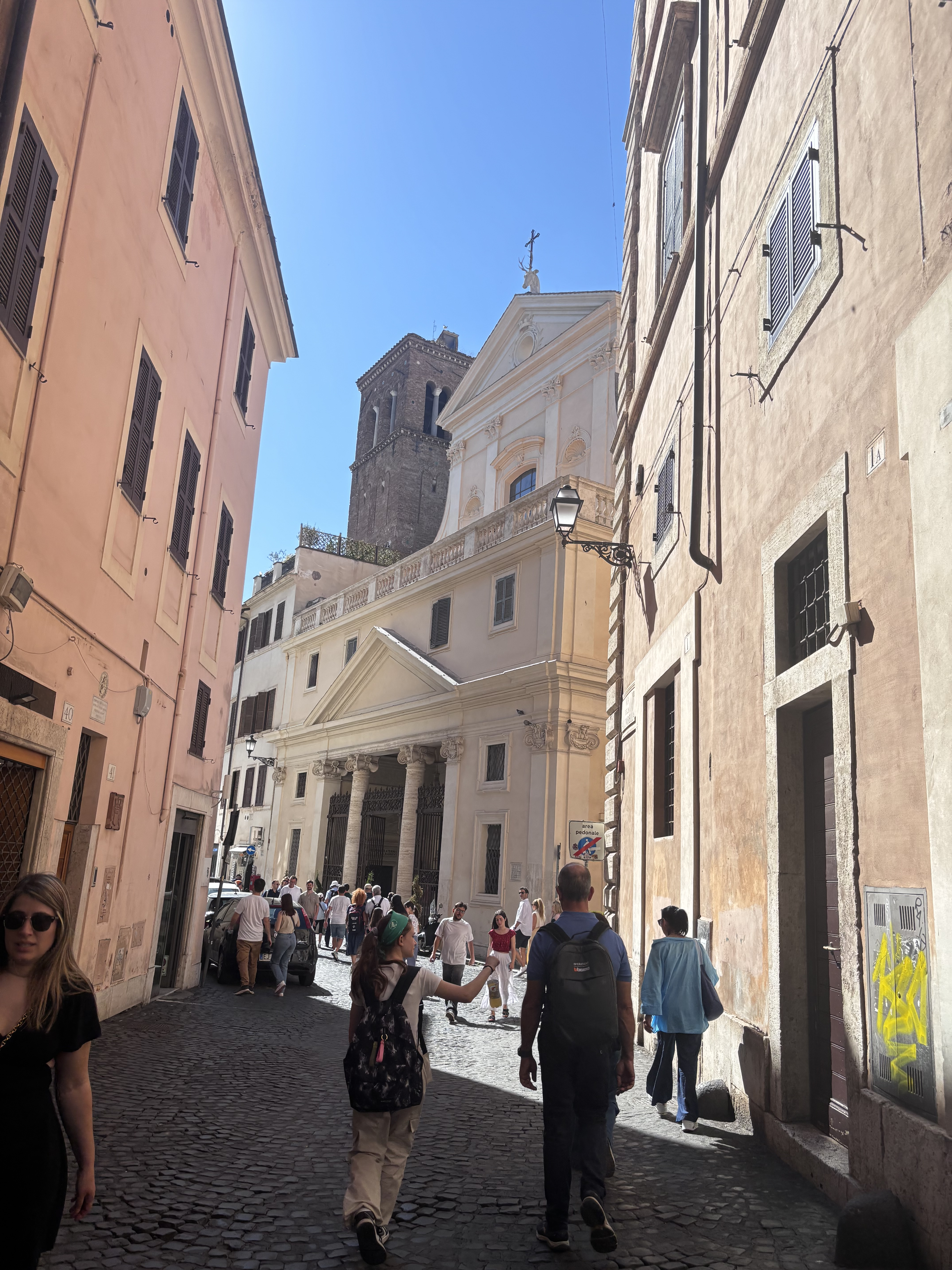
View of the basilica from via della Palombella

A church at the site was founded by the 8th century. The church was recorded as a diaconia (a centre for helping the poor and the sick) at the end of the pontificate of Pope Gregory II (715-731). It is mentioned in some documents dating from the 10th and 11th centuries, where this church is called in platana (between the plane trees) referring to the tree planted in the garden of the martyr Eustace. However, tradition holds that the emperor Constantine I had previously built an oratory here. This church was called "ad Pantheon in regione nona e iuxta templum Agrippae" (at the Pantheon in the ninth rione and next to the temple of Agrippa").

The church was restored and had a new campanile added at the end of the 12th century, during the pontificate of Celestine III (1191–1198), who also deposited the putative relics of Eustace and his family in the church. In the 16th century, it was a favored praying-place for St Philip Neri. In the 17th and 18th centuries, it was almost completely rebuilt, with only the campanile remaining from the old structure. The new design, in the Roman Baroque style, was produced by several architects : Cesare Corvara and Giovanni Battista Contini (1641–1723), who added chapels and the portico, Antonio Canevari (1681–1750), Nicola Salvi (1697–1751) and finally, from 1728, Giovanni Domenico Navone. The new high altar, in bronze and polychrome marble, was added by Nicola Salvi in 1739 and in 1749 Ferdinando Fuga put a baldachin over it. The choir and the sacristy were designed by Canevari and built by Giovanni Moscati.

== Façade ==
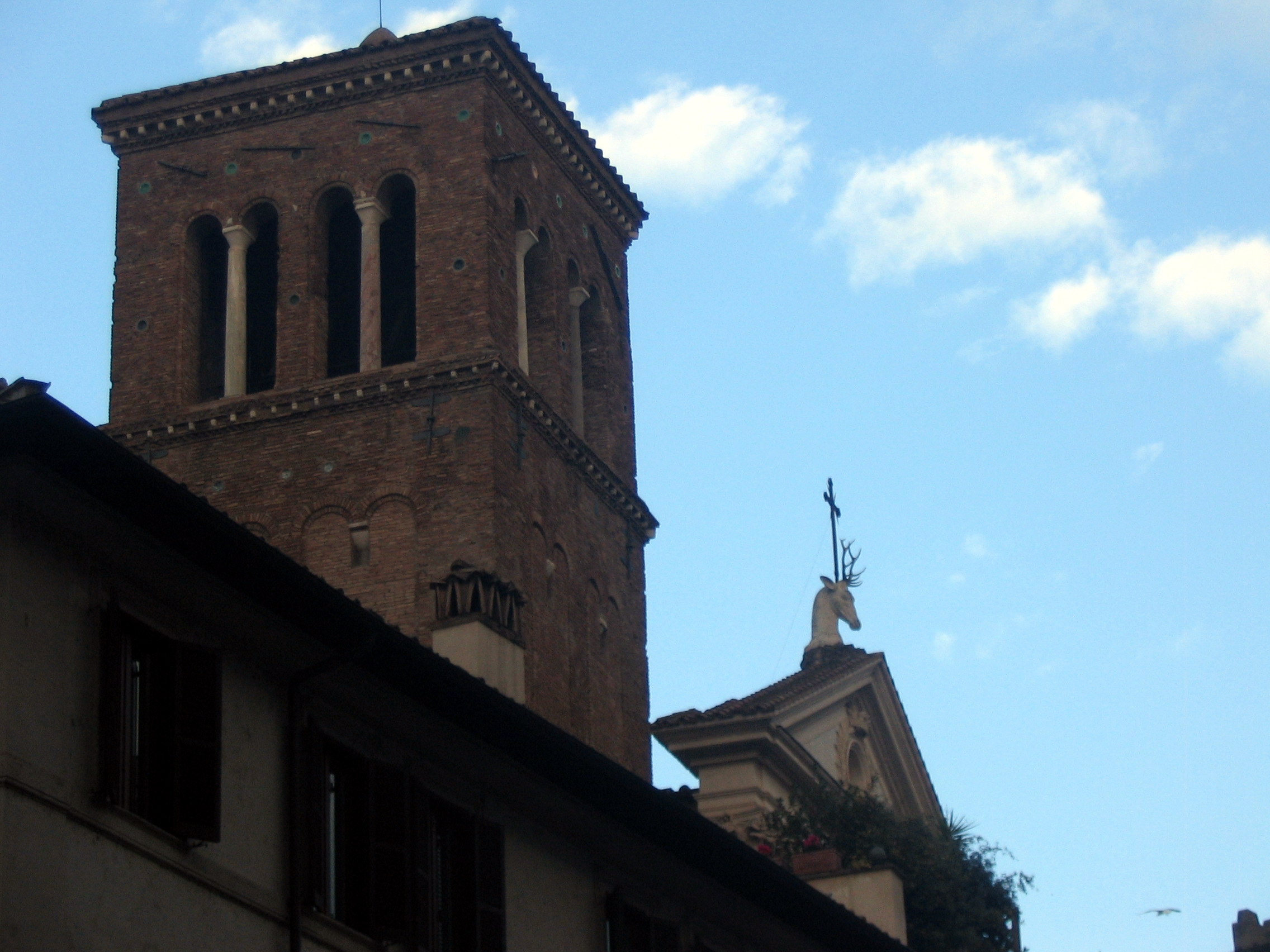
Campanile and the pediment with a deer head with a cross between the antlers

The façade was built under the direction of Cesare Corvara († 1703) with the collaboration of other architects. It consists of two sections, with the upper section standing back. The lower part is marked with four pilasters and two columns, all with Ionic capitals with in the middle of each capital a small head of a deer. The spirals of the volutes are connected by a small laurel wreath. On the right side of the facade a plaque was placed in memory of the flood of the Tiber River in 1495, whose waters reached up to the basilica.

The top section is divided by four pilasters with on each side a large volute. In the middle is a large window with an arcuated cornice, flanked on each side by a niche adorned with shells. On top is a triangular pediment with in its middle a circular window surrounded with palm branches and surmounted by a crown. On top of the pediment stands a deer head with a cross between the antlers (done by the sculptor Paolo Morelli († 1719), in reference to the legend of Saint Eustace.

An iron gate, made by Gian Battista Contini, closes off the porch.

The square Romanesque campanile is situated on the back of the church at its left side. Construction was started in 1196 under the pontificate of Pope Celestine III. The top part can be dated back to the end of the 12th century, while the base is somewhat older and can be dated at ca. 1090.

== Interior ==
The interior has a cruciform architectural plan and consists of a single nave. Its construction was carried out in mature Baroque style under the supervision of the architects Cesare Corvara and Antonio Canevari. The nave is marked on each side by three pilasters resting on a broad base. The pilasters are decked with fluted white marble and surmounted by composite capitals.

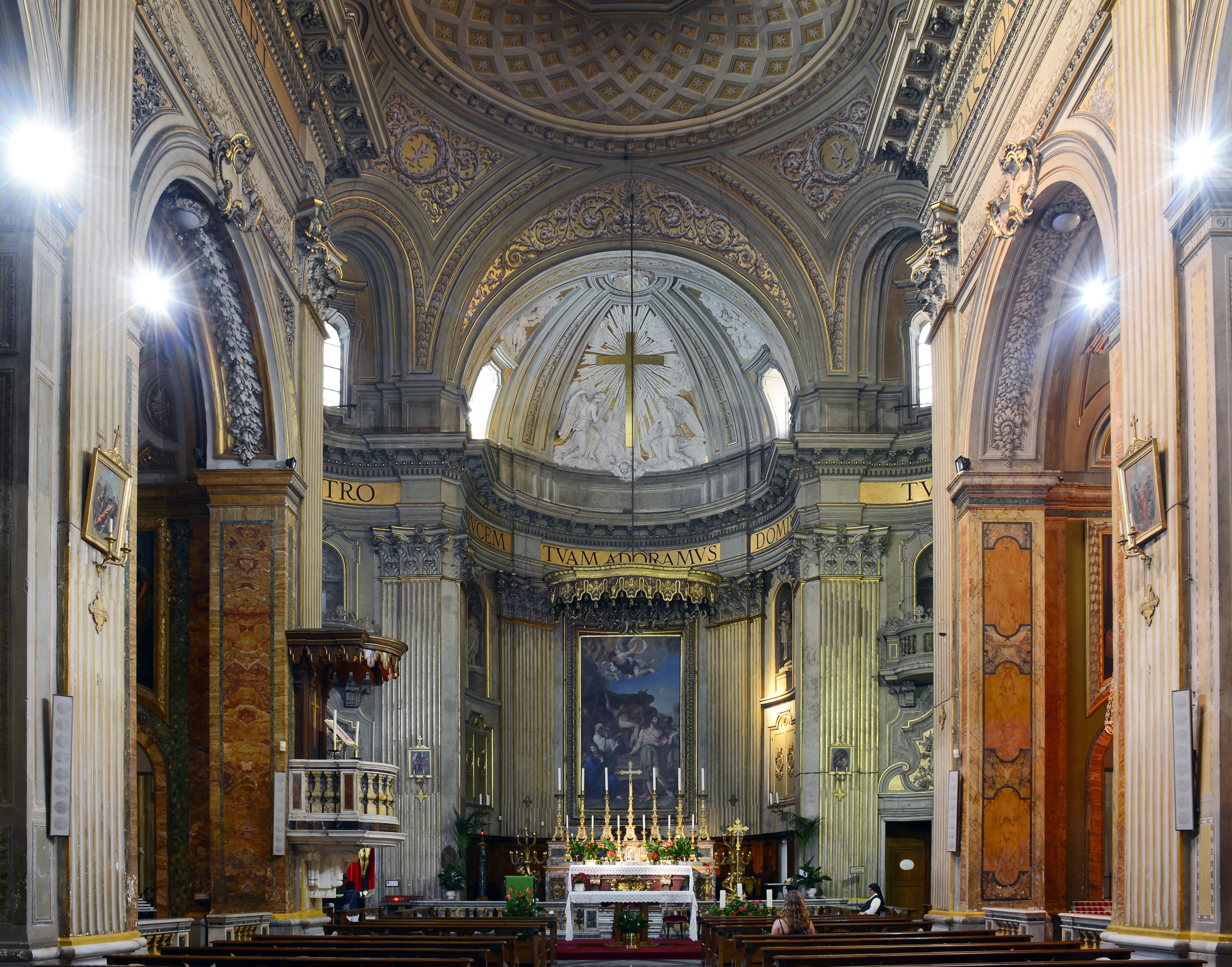
The main altar

The rib vault is stuccoed with flowers and leaves. The crossing is covered with a dome with a representation of the Holy Spirit in its middle.

The main altar was commissioned by Cardinal Neri Corsini and designed by the architect Nicola Salvi. He made it into an elegant and refined synthesis of marble and gilded metal. The top of the altar rests on an urn in porphyry rosso antico, the costly stone of the ancients, that contains the putative relics of Saint Eustace. The altarpiece was painted in 1727 by Francesco Ferdinandi (1679–1740), also named "l'Imperiali". It represents the martyrdom of Saint Eustace and his family who were roasted to death inside a bronze statue of a bull or an ox, in the year AD 118. The gilded wooden baldachin (circa 1746) over the main altar is attributed to Ferdinando Fuga (1699–1781).

The rear of the church is almost completely covered with the organ, made by Johann Conrad Werle in 1767. The gilded balustrade and the wooden front of the organ were executed in Rococo style by Bernardino Mammucari, Francesco Michetti and Carlo Pacilli. Above the organ stands a glass window representing "the Penitent Magdalene", realized in the last decade of the 19th century by Gabriel and Louis Gesta di Tolosa.

The pulpit was executed in polychrome marble and dates from 1937 to commemorate Pope Benedict XV (1914-1922), who as Cardinal Giacoma della Chiesa frequently preached in this church. His mother, Marquesa della Chiesa lived in the apartments across the street from the church.

== Right side ==
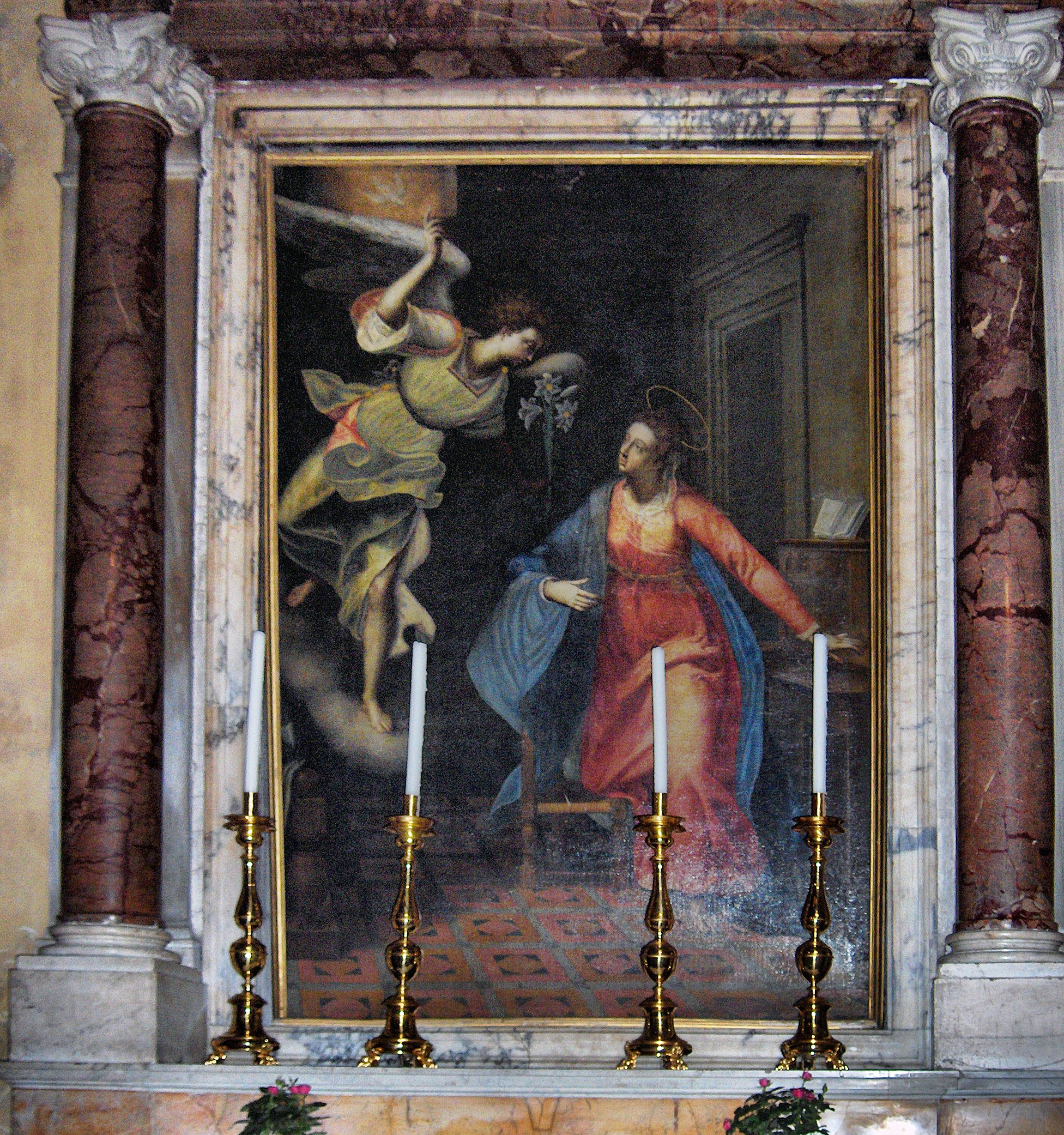
"The Annunciation" by Ottavio Lioni

- The Chapel of the Holy Family dates from 1854. The altarpiece by Pietro Gagliardi (1809–1890) represent the Holy Family in Jerusalem. On the right wall is a white marble funeral monument with the bust of Luigi Greppi († 1673), an illustrious member of the Confraternity of the Holy Sacrament. On the left side of the altar stands a small statue of Saint Raymond Nonnatus, who, according to his hagiography, was nominated Cardinal-Deacon of Sant' Eustachio by pope Gregory IX in 1239, but died en route to Rome.
- The Chapel of the Annunciation : its decoration was finished in 1874. Above the 17th-century altar stand two columns of coralline breccia that support a broken pediment with a bass-relief in stucco representing the Virgin and Child. The altarpiece by Ottavio Leoni (or Lioni) (1578–1630) represents the Annunciation.
- The Chapel of the Sacred Heart was restored between 1934 and 1937 by Corrado Mezzana (1890–1952), who also added the altarpiece representing the Sacred Heart of Jesus, on the left wall, the painting "The Last Supper" and on the right wall the painting "Christ on the Cross and Saint Longinus piercing his Heart".
- The right transept contains the paintings made by Jacopo Zoboli (1681–1767) in 1729. On the left wall hangs the large painting of "Saint Jerome" and in front "The meeting between the Holy Virgin and Elisabeth". The large wooden confessionals were made by Corrado Mezzana.

== Left side ==
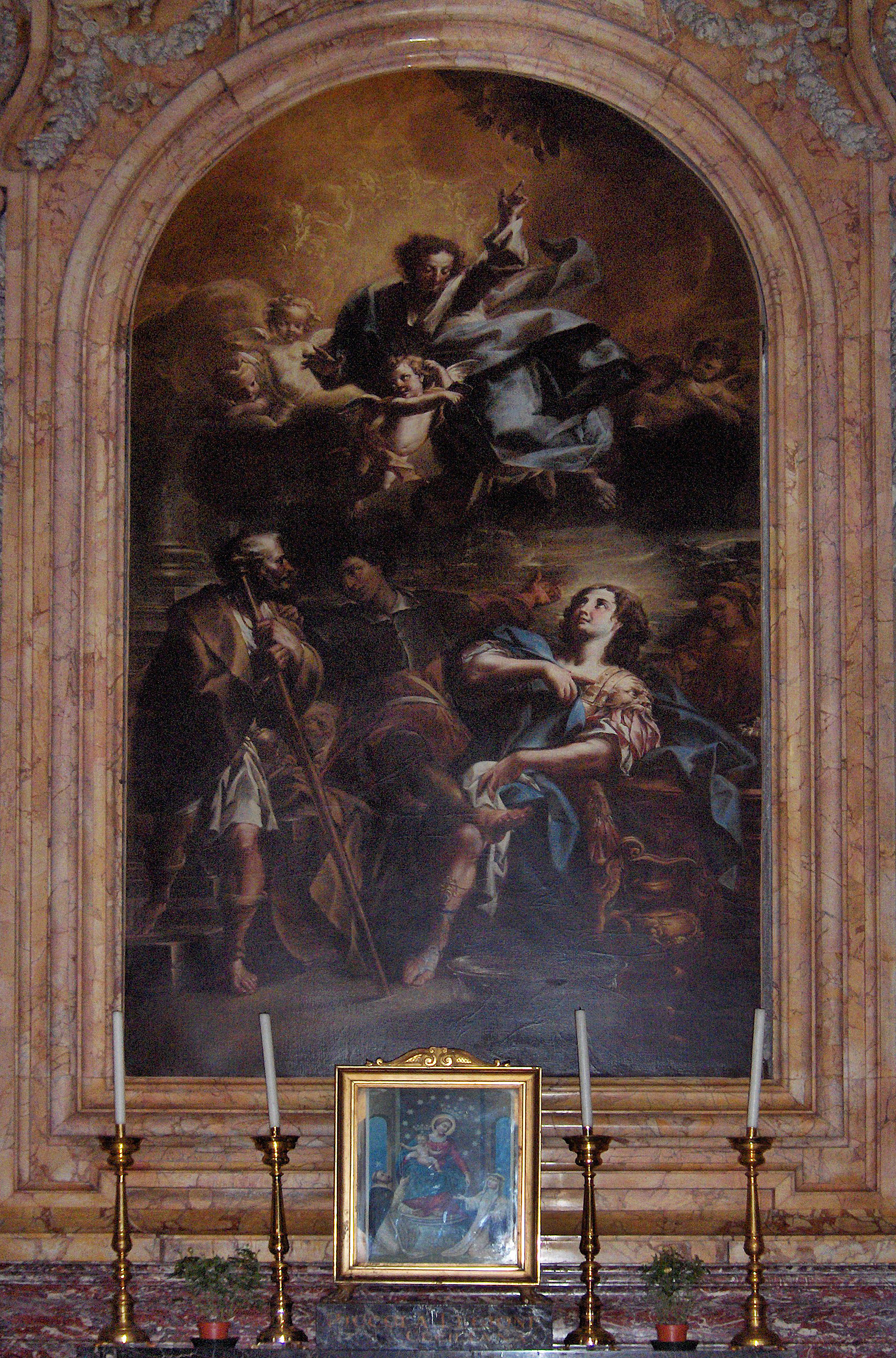
"Saint Julian the Hospitaler" by Biagio Puccini

- Baptistery lies next to the entrance of the church. The glass window represents "The Baptism of Jesus". The baptismal font dates from the 16th century.
- The Chapel of Saint Julian the Hospitaller was renovated from 1706. The altarpiece by Biagio Puccini (1675–1721) shows the saint curing a leper and welcoming an old pilgrim. The fresco on the ceiling represents "The Eternal Father"
- The Chapel of the Archangel Michael is the largest chapel of this church. It was finished between 1716 and 1719 by Alessandro Speroni. The altarpiece by Giovanni Bigatti (1774–1817) is a dramatic rendering of the Archangel Michael triumphing over Satan. Next to the altar hang two paintings : St Raymond Nonnatus and St Frances of Rome. On the left wall is the funeral monument of Teresa Tognoli Canale (1807) and on the right wall the funeral monument by Lorenzo Ottoni (1658–1736) of Silvio Cavalleri († 1717), private secretary to the popes Innocent XII and Clement XI.
- The Chapel of the Immaculate Heart of Mary was renovated from 1771 on by the architect Melchiorre Passalacqua and around 1800 by the sculptor Agostino Penna. Next to the altar stand two marble columns in "verde antico" that support a tympanum with two angels in stucco. The oval painting of the Immaculate Heart of Mary is a copy made in 1848 from the original painting by Giovanni Battista Casanova. On the left wall hangs a painting by Étienne de La Vallée Poussin (1774) representing "The Flight to Egypt". The painting on the right is "The Holy Family" (1774) by Tommaso Conca († 1815). The fresco on the ceiling renders "The Annunciation". At the altar of the left transept there is the altarpiece Incontro tra la Santa Vergine e Elisabetta (The Visitation, 1727) by Jacopo Zoboli.
- The left transept contains the statue of the Immaculate Heart of Mary (second half of the 20th century).
- The Chapel of the Crucifix contains the tomb of don Pirro Scavizzi (1884–1964), the parish priest of this church between 1919 and 1932, whose beatification is under consideration.

== List of titulars (cardinal deacons) ==
The following were Cardinal Deacons of S. Eustachio:

- ? Gregorio (1088–1099)
- Gregorio, OSB (←1118–1137)
- ? Gaymer (1130 – before 1134)
- ? Stefano (circa 1134–?)
- Vassalo (1134–1142)
- Astaldo degli Astalli (1143–1151)
- Ildebrando Grassi, Canonico Regolare (1152–1157)
- Guido di Crema (1155 o 1157–1158)
- Pietro di Miso (1158–1165?)
- Ugo Ricasoli (1163? – circa 1182)
  - Stefano (1172–1173), pseudocardinal of Antipope Callixtus III
- Gianfelice (1188–1189)
- Ugolino dei Conti di Segni (1198–1206)
- Aldobrandino Gaetani (o Ildebrando) (1216–1219)
- Rinaldo dei Signori di Ienne (1227–1234)
- Robert Somercote (1231 or 1239–1251)
- The claim that Ramón Nonnato held this titular church ca. 1240 has been disproved.
- Guglielmo Fieschi (1244–1256)
- Uberto Coconati (1261–1276)
- Giordano Orsini (1278–1287)
- Pietro Colonna (1288–1297)
- Riccardo Petroni (1298–1314)
- Arnaud de Via (1317–1335), nephew of Pope John XXII
  - Giovanni Visconti (1329), pseudocardinal of Antipope Nicholas V
- Bernard de la Tour (1342–1361)
- Pierre Flandrin (1371–1381)
- Francesco Renzio (1381–1390)
- Baldassare Cossa (1402–1410)
  - Alfonso Carrillo de Albornoz (1408–1418), pseudocardinal of Antipope Benedict XIII (1419–1423)
  - Giacomo Isolani (1413–1417), pseudocardinal of Antipope John XXIII (1417-1420?)
- Vacant (1423–1439)
- Alberto Alberti (1439–1445)
  - Alfonso Carrillo de Acuña (or Acuña de Carrillo) (1440), pseudocardinal of Antipope Felix V, declined the appointment
- Giacomo del Portogallo (1456–1459)
- Francesco Nanni-Todeschini-Piccolomini (1460–1503)
- Alessandro Farnese (1503–1519); in commendam (1519–1534)
- Paolo Emilio Cesi (1534–1537)
- Agostino Trivulzio (1537)
- Cristoforo Giacobazzi (1537–1540)
- Guido Ascanio Sforza di Santa Fiora (1540–1552)
- Niccolò Caetani (1552–1585)
- Ferdinando de' Medici (1585–1587)
- Filippo Guastavillani (1587)
- Alessandro Damasceni Peretti (1587–1589)
- Girolamo Mattei (1589–1592)
- Guido Pepoli (1592–1595)
- Odoardo Farnese (1595–1617)
- Andrea Baroni Peretti Montalto (1617–1621)
- Alessandro d'Este (1621)
- Maurizio di Savoia (1621–1626)
- Francesco Boncompagni (1626–1634)
- Ippolito Aldobrandini iuniore (1634–1637)
- Alessandro Cesarini (iuniore) (1638–1644)
- Marzio Ginetti (1644)
- Carlo de' Medici (1644)
- Girolamo Colonna (1644–1652)
- Giangiacomo Teodoro Trivulzio (1652–1653)
- Virginio Orsini (1653–1656)
- Vincenzo Costaguti (1656–1660)
- Lorenzo Raggi (1660–1664)
- Carlo Pio di Savoia the younger (1664–1667)
- Friedrich Landgraf von Hessen-Darmstadt (1667–1668)
- Decio Azzolino iuniore (1668–1681)
- Felice Rospigliosi (1682–1685)
- Domenico Maria Corsi (1686–1696)
- Vincenzo Grimani (1698–1710)
- Annibale Albani (1712–1716)
- Curzio Origo (1716–1726); titolo pro illa vice (1726–1737)
- Neri Maria Corsini (1737–1770)
- Giovanni Costanzio Caracciolo (1770–1780)
- Pasquale Acquaviva d'Aragona (1780–1788)
- Vincenzo Maria Altieri (1788–1794)
- Filippo Carandini (1794–1810)
- Vacant (1810–1816)
- Alessandro Lante Montefeltro Della Rovere (1816–1818)
- Giuseppe Albani (1818–1828)
- Vacant (1828–1832)
- Ludovico Gazzoli (1832–1857)
- Teodolfo Mertel (1858–1881)
- Angelo Jacobini (1882–1886)
- Luigi Trombetta (1899–1900)
- Vacant (1900–1914)
- Michele Lega (1914–1924); titolo pro illa vice (1924–1926)
- Carlo Perosi (1926–1930)
- Vacant (1930–1946)
- Giuseppe Bruno (1946–1954)
- Vacant (1954–1958)
- Fernando Cento, titolo pro illa vice (1958–1965)
- Francis John Brennan (1967–1968)
- Giacomo Violardo (1969–1978)
- Vacant (1978–1991)
- Guido Del Mestri (1991–1993)
- Vacant (1993–2001)
- Sergio Sebastiani (2001–2024)
- Rolandas Makrickas (2024–)

== Sources ==
- Richard Krautheimer, Corpus Basilicarum Christianarum Romae: The Early Christian Basilicas of Rome (IV-IX Cent.) (Roma: Pontificio istituto di archeologia cristiana, 1937), pp. 213–218.
- Antonio Menegaldo & Vincenzo Francia, Basilica di Sant' Eustachio in Campo Marzio (in Italian) – booklet on sale in the church
- Carla Appetiti, S. Eustachio (Roma: Edizioni "Roma", 1964).
- Pasquale Adinolfi, Rione Campo Marzo, Rione S. Eustachio (Firenze: Le Lettere, 1983) [Roma nell'età di mezzo / Pasquale Adinolfi, 4].

== See also ==
- Pietro Gagliardi
- Ottavio Leoni
- Francesco Ferdinandi
- Jacopo Zoboli

Preceded by Sant'Eugenio	Landmarks of Rome; Sant'Eustachio	Succeeded by Santa Francesca Romana, Rome
