= Angelo Jacobini =

Roman Catholic cardinal (1825–1886)

His Eminence Angelo Jacobini
- Cardinal-Deacon of Sant'Eustachio
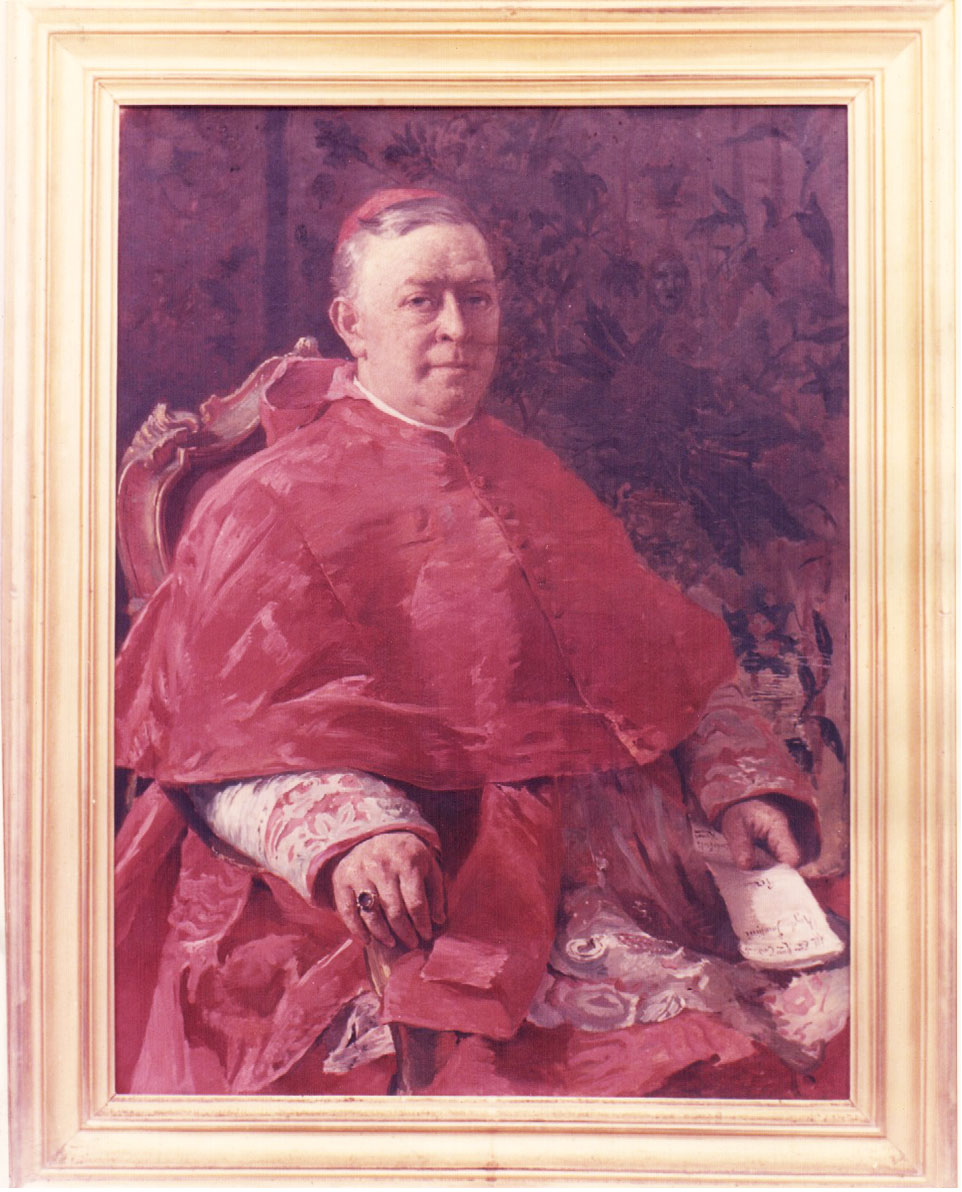
- Church: Roman Catholic Church
- Appointed: 30 March 1882
- Term ended: 3 March 1886
- Predecessor: Teodolfo Mertel
- Successor: Luigi Trombetta
- Previous post: Secretary of the Congregation for Extraordinary Ecclesiastical Affairs (1875-77)

Orders
- Created cardinal: 27 March 1882 by Pope Leo XIII
- Rank: Cardinal-Deacon

Personal details
- Born: Angelo Maria Jacobini; 25 April 1825 Genzano, Papal States
- Died: 3 March 1886 (aged 60) Rome, Kingdom of Italy
- Buried: Campo Verano
- Parents: Vincenzo Jacobini; Giacinta Parri
- Education: Sapienza University of Rome
- Motto: In Nomine Domine ("In the name of the Lord")
- Coat of arms

Angelo Jacobini (25 April 1825 – 3 March 1886) was an Italian prelate of the Catholic Church who spent his entire career in the Roman Curia. He was made a cardinal in 1882.

== Biography ==
Angelo Maria Jacobini was born in Genzano on 25 April 1825. He was a cousin of Luigi Jacobini, who was made a cardinal in 1879.

He studied at the seminary in Albano and then at the Sapienza University of Rome. The date of his priestly ordination is unknown. He was never consecrated a bishop. He obtained a doctorate in theology in 1846. He also studied canon and civil law. He then held a series of positions in the Roman Curia, beginning as auditor of the Congregation of the Council. He was then assessor of the Congregation of the Apostolic Visit from 1867 to 1875 and became its secretary on 22 June 1875.

From 1867 to 1869, he worked in the preparatory commission of the First Vatican Council and from 1869 to 1870 was assistant to the undersecretary of that Council.

In 1873, he gave testimony in Ireland in a lawsuit for defamation brought by a parish priest against Cardinal Paul Cullen, Archbishop of Dublin; he contributed to Cullen's successful defense of his suspension of the priest.

He was appointed secretary of the Congregation of Extraordinary Ecclesiastical Affairs on 3 October 1875. He was named assessor of the Congregation of the Inquisition on 15 March 1877.

Pope Leo XIII made him a cardinal deacon on 27 March 1882; he was assigned the deaconry of San Eustachio. To avoid confusion with his cousin Cardinal Luigi Jacobini's coat of arms, which used the Jacobini family's coat of arms, he added elements from his mother's family.

He died in Rome on 3 March 1886.
