= Giovanni Bigatti =

- Giovanni Bigatti, Count Ugolino, after Giuseppe Errante, c. 1810
- Born: 1774; Milan, Duchy of Milan
- Died: 1817 (aged 42–43); Milan, Kingdom of Lombardy–Venetia
- Education: Giuseppe Errante
- Known for: Painting; Engraving
- Movement: Neoclassicism

Giovanni Bigatti (1774 – 1817) was an Italian painter and engraver.

== Biography ==
Giovanni Bigatti was born in Milan in 1774. One of the most accomplished students of the Neoclassical painter Giuseppe Errante, he lived in Rome on a government grant from 1805 to 1810. While there, he painted a crucifixion scene for the church of San Lorenzo in Panisperna and three canvases for the high altar of the Basilica of Sant'Eustachio, depicting Saint Michael the Archangel flanked by Saints Raymond Nonnatus and Frances of Rome.

Bigatti is perhaps best known as a printmaker. He was one of the few Italian engraver to adopt the mezzotint technique. He used this technique to reproduce several of his master's paintings. Of particular interest are his mezzotint reproductions of Errante’s Napoleonic Allegory, Count Ugolino, Endymion, and Jupiter and the Swan. This style of engraving was highly regarded in Italy but effectively died out at its inception due to the premature deaths of Bigatti, who passed away in 1817 following a lingering throat infection, and his colleague Antonio Rancati, who died around the same time.

Bigatti is also remembered for numerous plates created using the common technique of etching. Together with Rancati, he produced 132 aquatint plates for Giulio Ferrario’s multi-volume ethnographic work Costume antico e moderno di tutti i popoli (Ancient and Modern Costume of All Peoples, Milan, 1817–1834). In 1810, he contributed a series of aquatints to Souvenir de Milan, a collection of prints created by several prominent Milanese artists and engravers of the time, including Ignazio Fumagalli and Luigi Rados.

== Works (selected) ==
Veduta of Porta Ticinese, Milan, 1810

Veduta of the Colonne di San Lorenzo, Milan, 1810

Interior of the Ca' Granda, Milan, 1810

Crypt of Milan Cathedral, 1810

== Bibliography ==
- Ferrario, Giulio (1835). Le classiche stampe dal cominciamento della calcografia fino al presente compresi gli artisti viventi. Milan: Santo Bravetta. pp. 53–54.
- "Bigatti, Giovanni". Benezit Dictionary of Artists. Oxford: Oxford University Press. 2011. doi:10.1093/benz/9780199773787.article.B00019614.
