= Saint Eustace =

Christian Roman general martyred in AD 118

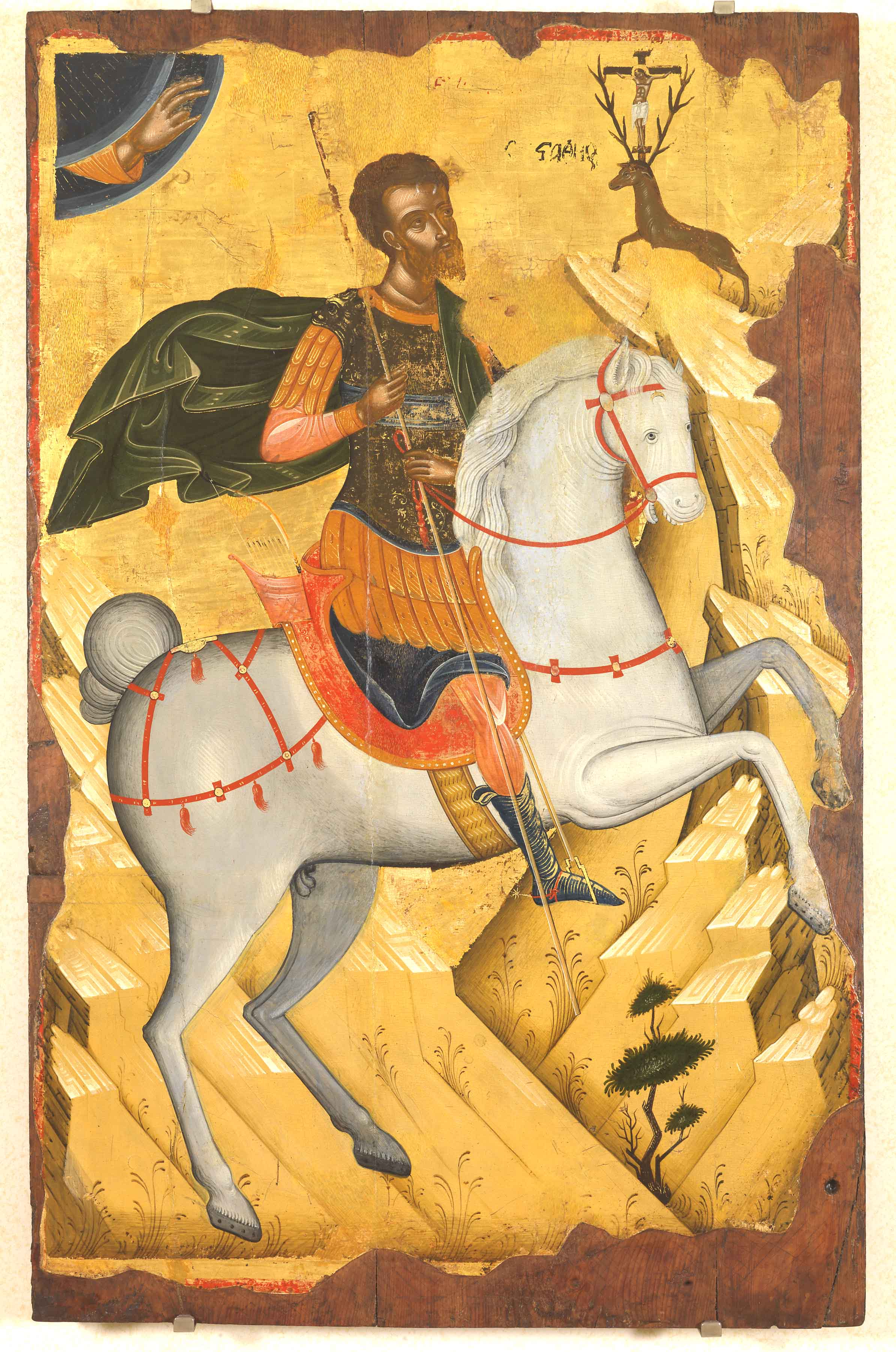
- Greek Orthodox icon of St. Eustathios

Martyr
- Died: 118
- Venerated in: Anglican Communion; Roman Catholic Church; Eastern Orthodox Church; Oriental Orthodoxy
- Canonized: Pre-Congregation
- Feast: 20 September (Western Christianity, Byzantine Christianity); Thout 22 (Coptic Christianity)
- Attributes: Christian Martyrdom, bull; crucifix; horn; stag; oven
- Patronage: against fire; fire prevention; firefighters; hunters; hunting; huntsmen; trappers; against family discord; difficult situations; torture victims; Madrid; Matera

Saint Eustace (Latinized Eustachius or Eustathius; Greek: Εὐστάθιος Πλακίδας Eustathios Plakidas) was a Roman general who is revered as a Christian martyr. According to legend, he was a pagan who converted to Christianity after having a vision of the cross while hunting. He lost all his wealth, was separated from his wife and sons, and went into exile in Egypt. Called back to lead the Roman army by Emperor Trajan, Eustace was happily reunited with his family and restored to high social standing, but after the death of Trajan, he and his family were martyred at the command of Hadrian in AD 118 for refusing to sacrifice to Roman gods.

Eustace was venerated in the Byzantine Church from at least the 7th century. His veneration is attested for the Latin Church for the 8th century, but his rise to popularity in Western Europe happened in the high medieval period, during the 12th to 13th centuries. There are many versions and adaptations of his legend, in prose, in verse, and in the form of plays, in Latin, French and other languages. The saint, and scenes from his legend, were also frequently depicted in the figurative arts.

Eustace is counted as one of the Fourteen Holy Helpers. His feast day, both in Eastern and Western tradition, is on 20 September. The Armenian Apostolic Church commemorates St. Eustace on 1 October.

== Legend ==
=== Greek Vita ===
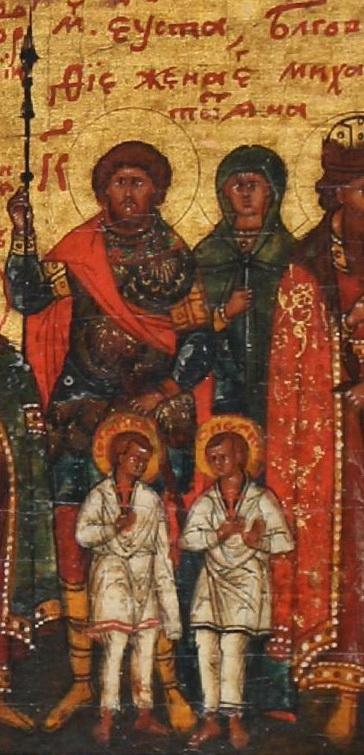
Great-martyr Eustathius Placidas with his family: wife Martyr Theopistes, and sons Martyrs Agapius and Theopistus. Fragment of Russian Menaion calendar icon (17th century)

The original tradition of the saint's passion is Greek, the oldest surviving version (BHG 641) was composed at some point during the 5th to 7th centuries. Already in the Greek version, the later saint is a pagan general (στρατηλάτης stratēlátēs) under Trajan, called Plakidas. The Greek text also has all of the main elements found in the medieval Western accounts. Plakidas converted after he had a vision of a cross while hunting a stag and heard a divine voice prophesying his misfortune. Plakidas was baptized and took the name Eustathios ("steadfast"), his wife Tatiana took the baptismal name Theopiste. Their two sons were named Agapios and Theopistos.

Eustathios lost his estates and his wealth, and he and his family emigrated to Egypt. They could not pay for the passage, hence the ship's captain demanded to keep Theopiste for himself. Eustathios escaped with his two sons by swimming. But later, when crossing a river, his sons were taken by wild animals. Eustathios believed them dead, but they were saved.

Years later, Trajan called Eustathios back to Rome to fight the barbarians, and Eustathios once again took the rank of general and raised an army. Among the soldiers were, unbeknownst to him, his two sons. After defeating the barbarians, the general and his staff stayed in the house of an old woman. Agapios and Theopistos recognized each other. The old woman turned out to be their mother, Theopiste, who managed to escape from the ship's captain before he could dishonour her. She recognized her husband, and the entire family was reunited.

When Trajan was succeeded by Hadrian, the new emperor asked his general to sacrifice to the gods, and when Eustathios refused, he threw him and his family to the lions, but the wild animals lay down at their feet. Therefore, Hadrian ordered them to be killed in a brazen bull. The bodies of the martyrs were recovered in secrecy by Christians and buried in a "well-known place".

=== French Vita ===
A Vita in French prose was composed around the middle of the 13th century.

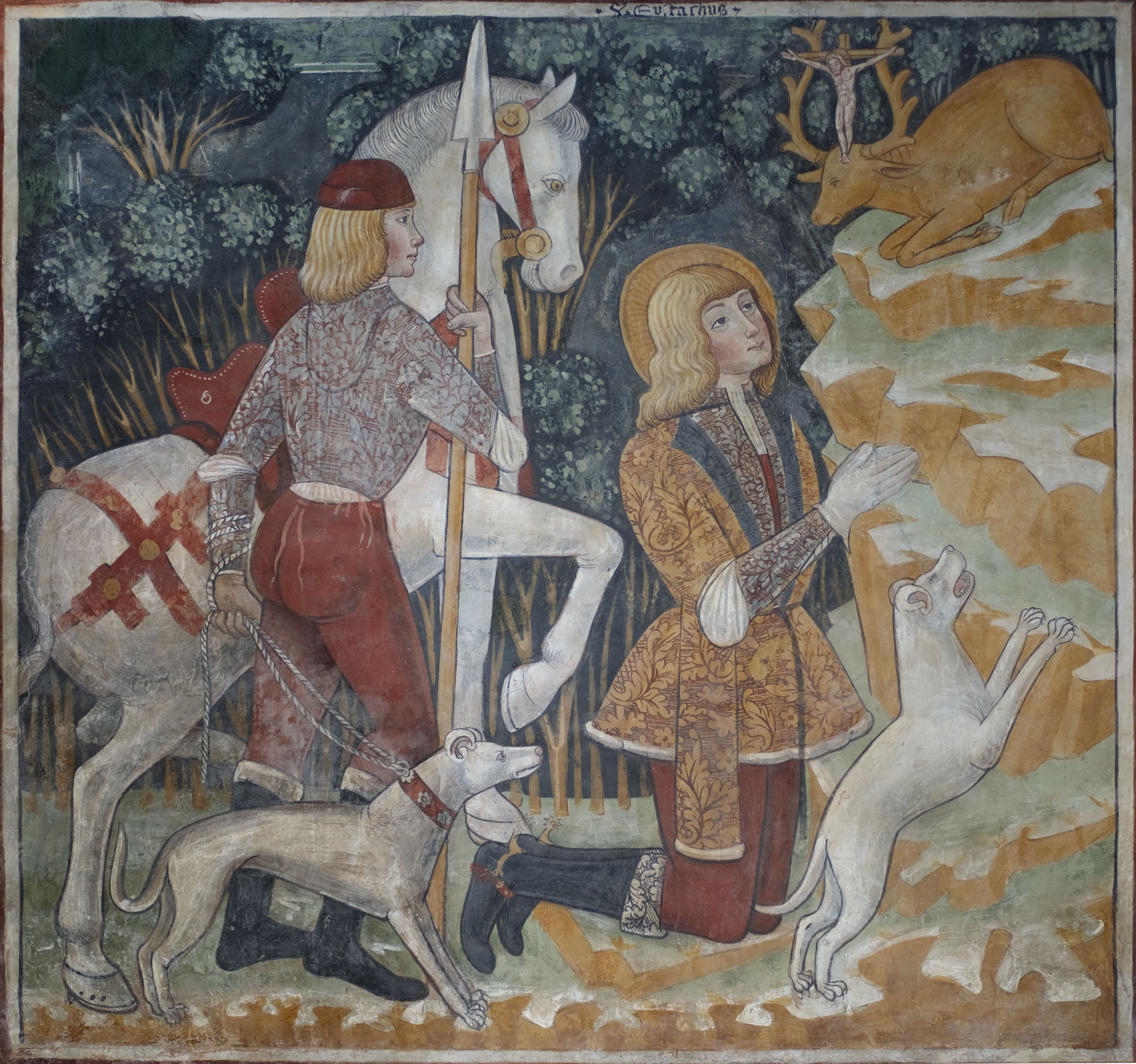
Vision of Saint Eustace, fresco at Oratorio di Santa Maria, Garbagna Nov. (Italy), late 15th century

In this version, the narrative begins with Placidus (Eustace's name before he was baptized) out hunting. He follows a deer into some woods and becomes separated from the group of hunters; the deer turns towards him. Placidus is then awestruck by a vision where he sees the cross between the antlers of the deer, and in that moment, he is commanded by the voice of God to be baptized along with his family on that very night by the Bishop of Rome. He is baptized and has his name changed to Eustace, and then he receives another vision from a voice warning him of future trials for him and his family. They lose their goods, servants, livestock, and social status. They attempt to travel by boat, but cannot afford the voyage. Eustace and his two sons Agapius and Theopistus are then removed from the boat and separated from Eustace's wife Theopista. They arrive at a river where Eustace has to carry them across one at a time. After successfully taking one to the other side, Eustace attempts to collect the other. However, both of his sons are taken by animals while he is crossing the river: one by a lion and the other by a wolf. Unknown to Eustace, his sons are saved and raised independently.

In the French tradition, Eustace then worked for fifteen years as a guard protecting fields until he was approached by two envoys of Roman emperor Trajan who were sent to persuade him to return to Rome and repel an uprising; Eustace complied. There in Rome, he was reinstated his original rank of general, led an army, and coincidentally, achieved victory in the home country of the captain who abducted his wife Theopista. Trading life stories after the battle, two soldiers discover they were the brothers abducted by animals, and overhearing them, Theopista recognizes her husband Eustace. Eustace and his family then return to Rome to celebrate at a victory dinner under the new Roman emperor Hadrian who was less tolerant towards Christians. Following the dinner, Hadrian requested Eustace and his family to make an offering to pagan gods; They refused. Eustace and his family were then thrown in a den of lions, but the lions did not touch them. Eustace and his family were then put into a brazen bull. They died, but their bodies were untouched by the flames.

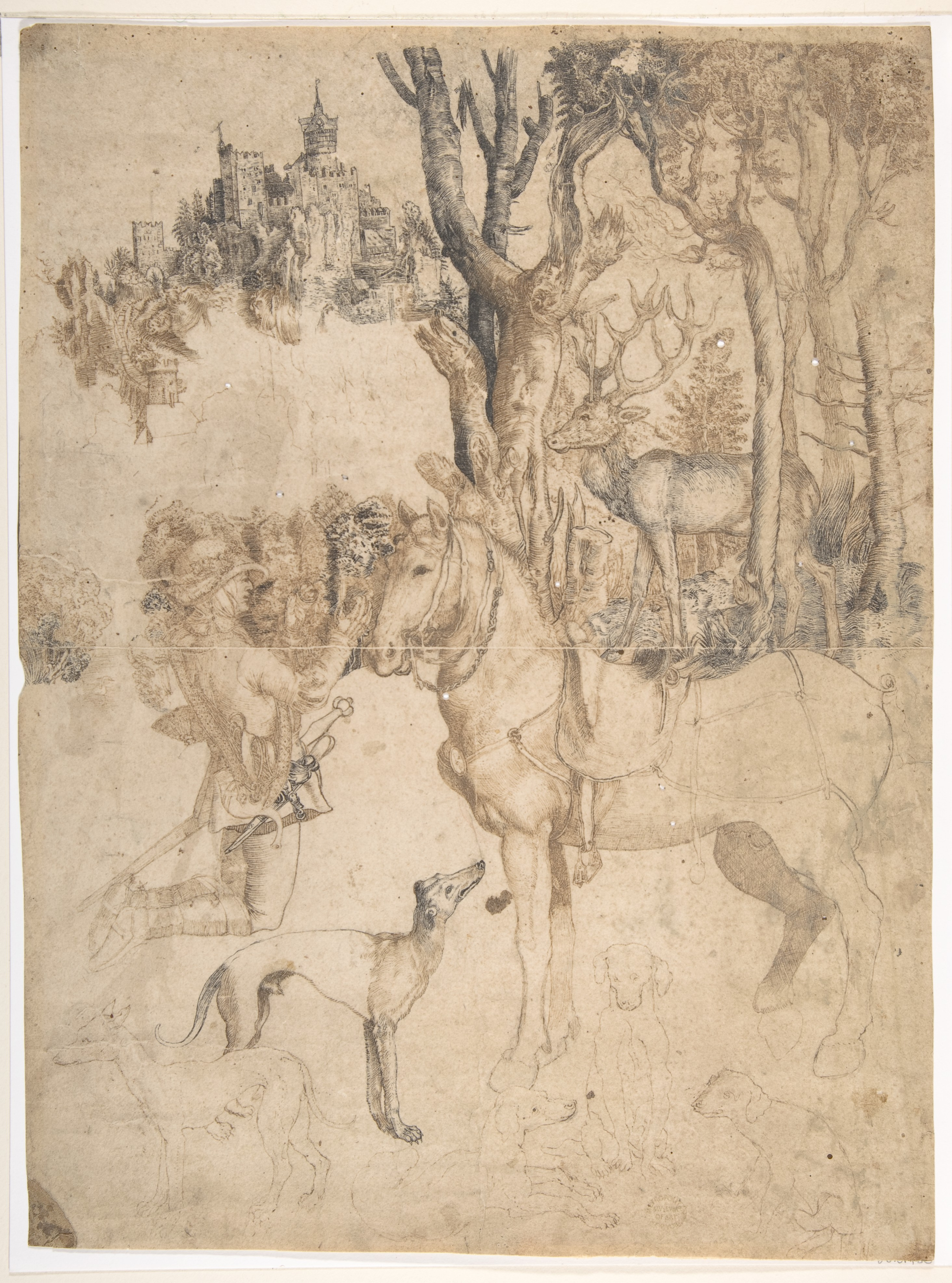
The Vision of St. Eustace, anonymous, German, 16th century, after Albrecht Dürer

=== Variants and adaptations ===
Numerous adaptations of the saint's legend were composed, in verse and in prose, during the high medieval period, both in France and in Italy. There is "rhythmic Life" of 220 verses (BHL 2771) of the 9th or 10th century, and a 13th-century version of 2052 rhyming octosyllabic verses. The legend was also adapted into at least ten different medieval plays in varying forms.

The legend up to St. Eustace's martyrdom is a variant of the narrative type "the Man Tried By Fate", which is also popular in chivalric romance in general. Except for an exemplum in Gesta Romanorum, all such tales are highly developed romances, such as Sir Isumbras. One of the medieval adaptations of the Eustace material as chivalric romance is the Spanish Book of the Knight Zifar.

== Historicity ==
The historicity of Eustace cannot be substantiated, and he is widely seen as a "fictitious saint", i.e. an adaptation in the form of hagiography of what was originally a didactic or entertaining fiction. Hippolyte Delehaye (1919) did not believe in the saint's historicity. The Bollandist commentator (Acta Sanctorum vol. 46, p. 209) considers two possibilities: that of the saint being entirely fictitious, or that of an unknown early oriental martyr whose original cult has vanished without a trace. The veneration of Eustace cannot be substantiated for times earlier than the 7th century, more than 501 years after his supposed martyrdom. The legend has little or no geographic detail, except for the "flight to Egypt", paralleling that of the Holy Family. The village of Badioson (Βαδιοσών) where Eustace retires after the loss of his family is unknown, the river Hydaspes where Eustace fights his victorious battle with the "barbarians" alludes to Alexander the Great and bears no relation to any historical conflict fought by emperor Trajan (Trajan's Parthian campaign resulted in an uneasy stalemate and was interrupted by Trajan's death in 117); nor is Hadrian known to have actively persecuted Christians. The origin of the Greek legend is most likely found in the Orient, likely Anatolia, perhaps Cappadocia, where the stag has long been venerated in local cults.

The similarity of the stag hunting scene with certain tales of the Mabinogion have been explained by Vielle (1990) as reflecting an underlying "Celto-Galatian" model. A distant Indian origin for the element of the "separated family" has been proposed by Gaster (1893), specifically the Buddhist tale of Pacatara and Visvantara from the Pali canon (Dhammapada).

== Veneration ==
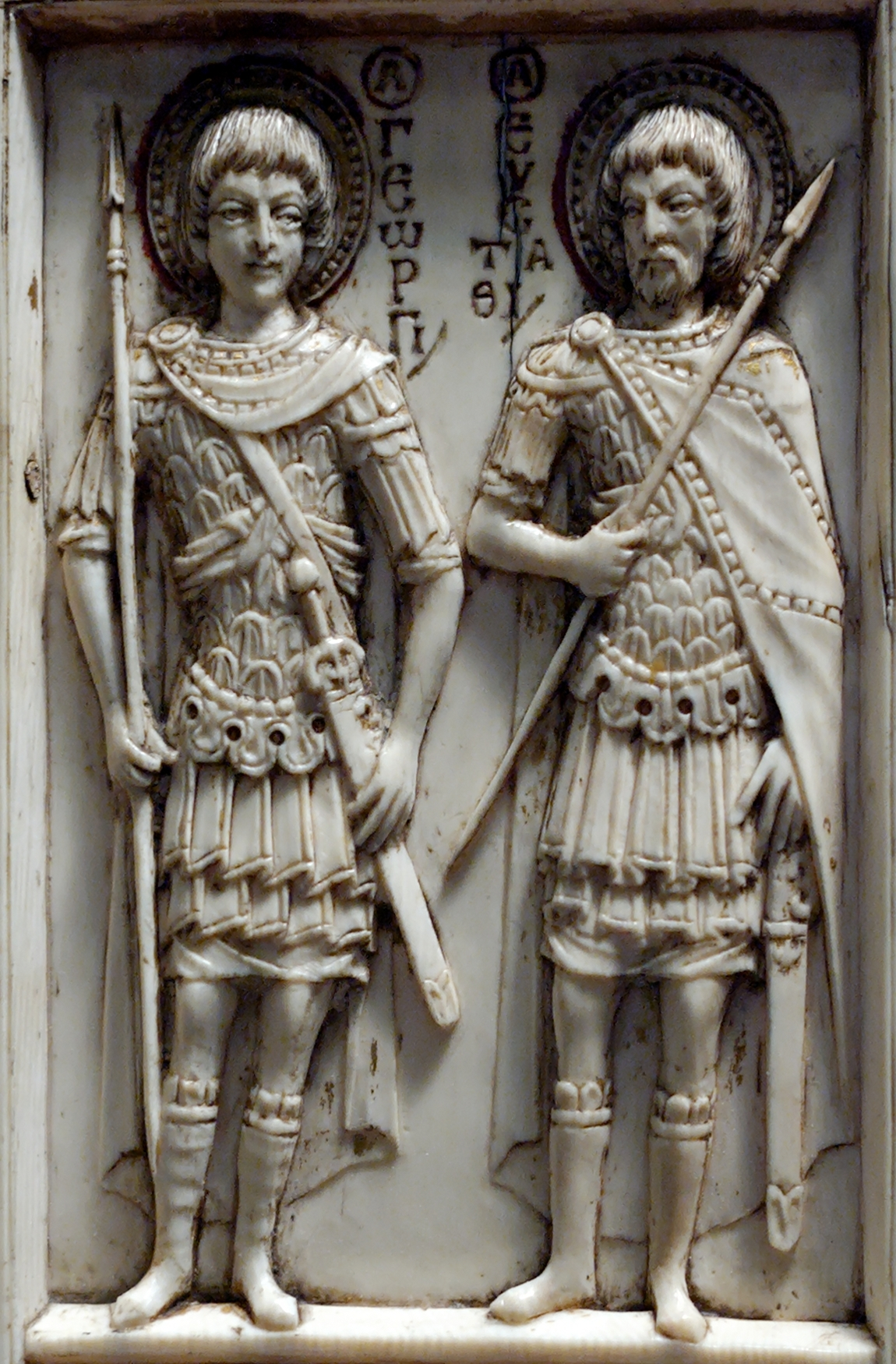
In an unusually early image, Eustace accompanies Saint George on a 10th-century Byzantine ivory Harbaville Triptych (Louvre Museum).

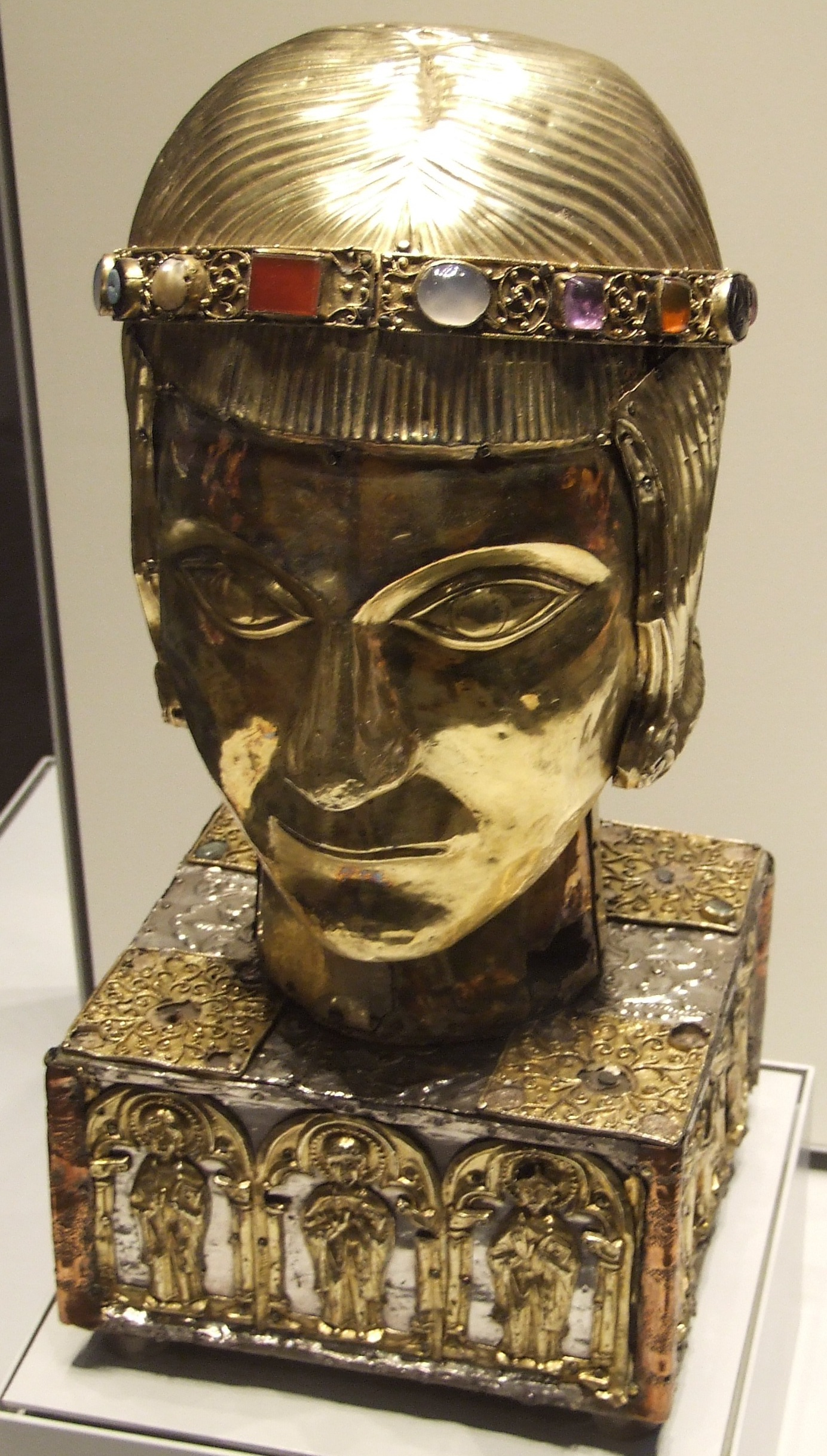
Medieval Reliquary of St. Eustace from the cathedral at Basel, Switzerland, now in the British Museum.

The veneration of Eustace originated in the Eastern Orthodox Church wherein he is venerated as Saint Eustathios the Great Martyr (Greek: Ἅγιος Εὐστάθιος ὁ Μεγαλομάρτυς). N. Thierry postulated that the tradition may have originated in Cappadocia, pointing out that a large repertoire of images of the Vision of Eustace exist as frescoes in this region's early-Christian rock-cut churches. Thierry also notes a 7th-century Armeno-Georgian stele at the Davit Garedja monastery in present-day Georgia with a relief depicting the Vision of Eustace, and a relief on the chancel of Tsebelda in Abkhazia, dated variously from the 7th to the 9th century, that also depicts the Vision.

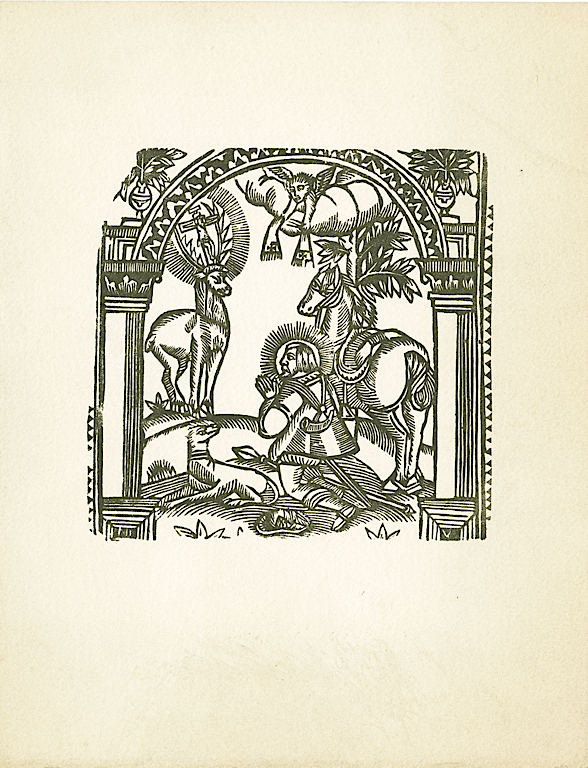
Anon. (France), Untitled (St. Eustace), 19th century, woodcut, Department of Image Collections, National Gallery of Art Library, Washington, DC

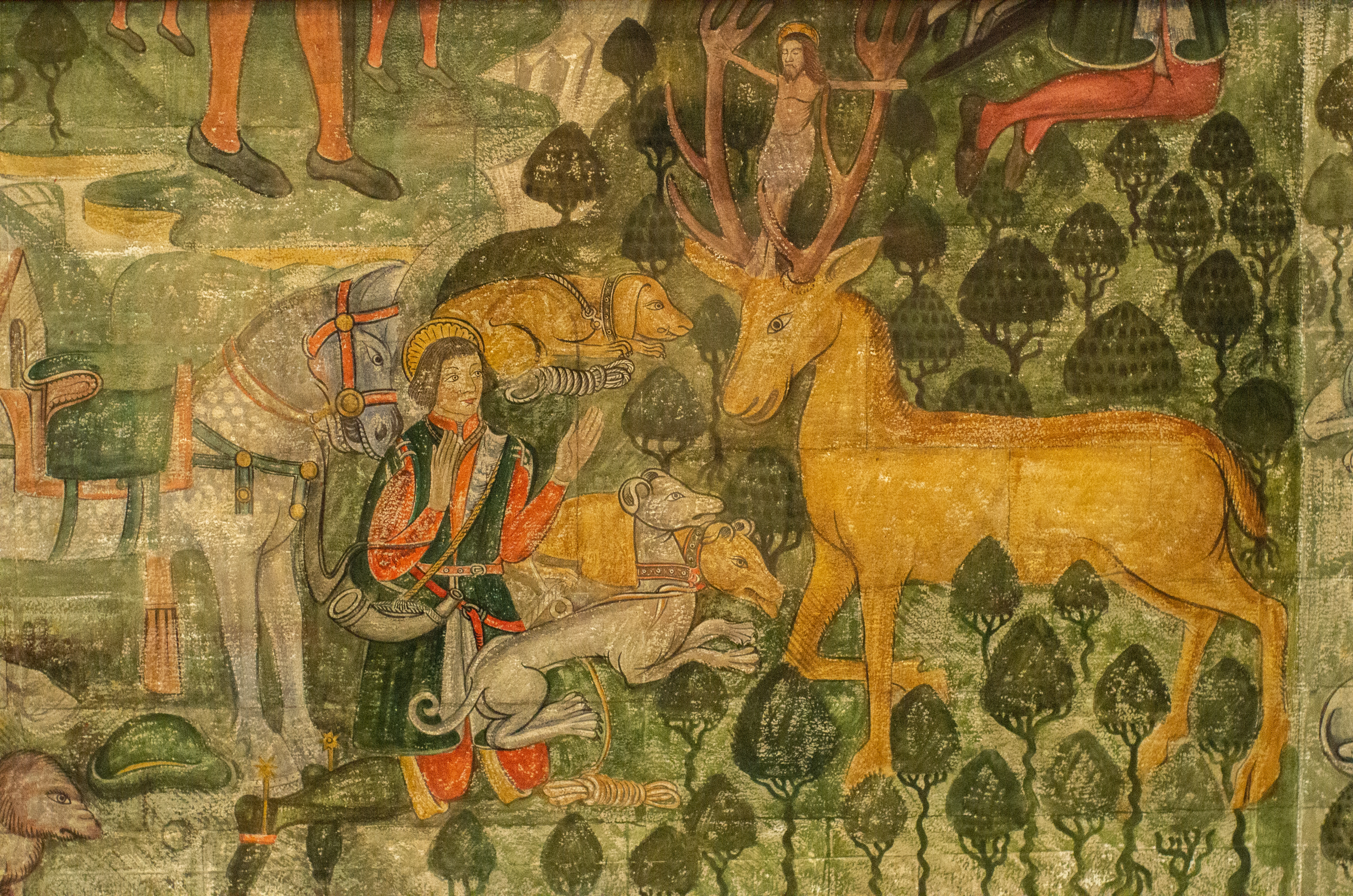
In the wall painting in Canterbury Cathedral, St Eustace sees Jesus standing between the horns of a stag without a cross.

In the West, an early medieval church dedicated to him that existed in Rome is mentioned in a letter of Pope Gregory II (731–741). His iconography may have passed to the 12th-century West, before which time European examples are scarce, in psalters, where the vision of Eustace, kneeling before a stag, illustrated Psalm 96, ii-12: "Light is risen to the just..."

An early European depiction of Eustace, the earliest one noted in the Duchy of Burgundy, is carved on a Romanesque capital at Vézelay Abbey. Abbot Suger mentions the first relics of Eustace in Europe, at an altar in the royal Basilica of St Denis; Philip Augustus of France rededicated the church of Saint Agnès, Paris, which became Saint-Eustache (rebuilt in the 16th–17th centuries). The story of Eustace was popularized in Jacobus de Voragine's Golden Legend (c. 1260). Scenes from the story, especially of Eustace kneeling before the stag, then became popular subjects of medieval religious art: examples include a wall painting at Canterbury Cathedral and stained glass windows at the Cathedral of Chartres.

Eustace became known as a patron saint of hunters and firefighters, and also of anyone facing adversity; he was traditionally included among the Fourteen Holy Helpers. He is the patron of hunters especially in Bavaria and Austria, while in France, Belgium and Western Germany, it is more common to find Hubert of Liège in this role. In the Anglican tradition, he has a (hunter's) horn as his attribute. He also is one of the patron saints of Madrid, Spain. Saint Eustace is honored in County Kildare, Ireland. There is a church dedicated to him on the campus of Newbridge College in Newbridge, County Kildare, and the schools' logo and motto is influenced by the vision of Saint Eustace. (However, the nearby village of Ballymore Eustace refers to the FitzEustace family.)

In Armenia, Erewmanavank ("Convent of the Holy Apparition") near Egin was said to be built on the actual location of the encounter of Placidus with the deer. The earliest surviving text detailing this is a manuscript from 1446, but the monastery is far older than that and probably a Byzantine foundation; J.-M. Thierry considers it to be a 10th-century foundation, perhaps by Greeks from Cappadocia. Although the monastery was destroyed during the Armenian genocide, Thierry, in the 1980s, noted that a transmitted form of the legend still existed among local Muslim Kurds who talked of a "deer of light" appearing at the site. In Georgian mythology, Saint Eustace became associated with the hunting deity Apsat, patron of game animals.

Saint Eustache's feast day in the Roman Catholic Church, as is also in the Eastern Orthodox Church, is September 20, as indicated in the Roman Martyrology. The celebration of Saint Eustache and his companions was included in the Roman Calendar from the twelfth century until 1969, when it was removed because of the completely fabulous character of the saint's Acta, resulting in a lack of sure knowledge about them. However, his feast is still observed by Roman Catholics who follow the pre-1970 Roman Calendar. Saint Eustace's commemoration was removed from the General Roman Calendar in 1970, though he continued to be commemorated in the latest edition of the Roman Martyrology. Local observance is still practiced.

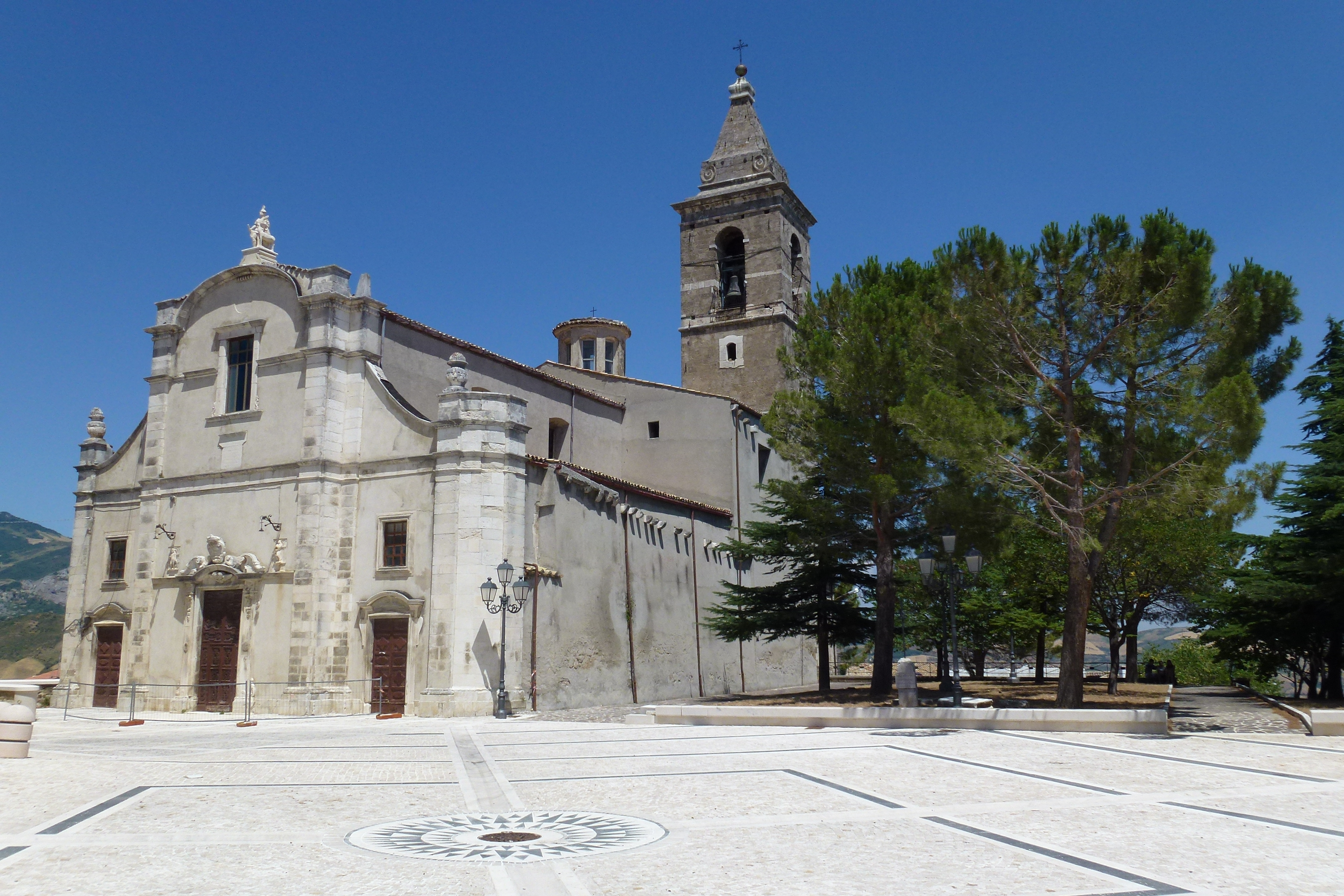
Chiesa di S. Eustachio, Tocco da Casauria

Sant'Eustachio is also honoured in Tocco da Casauria, a town in the province of Pescara in the Abruzzo region of central Italy. The town's church, built in the twelfth century, was dedicated to Saint Eustace. It was rebuilt after being partially destroyed by an earthquake in 1706.

The island of Sint Eustatius in the Caribbean Netherlands is named after him. Also St Eustachius church is situated in Pakiapuram village, Kanyakumari district, Tamil Nadu, India. Another church is situated in the name of St. Eustachius (St. Esthakiyar in Tamil) in Mittatharkulam, near valliyoor in Tirunelveli district.

== See also ==
- Historia Eustachio Mariana
- Hubert of Liège, another saint with a similar legend
- Saint-Eustache, Paris, a Parisian church bearing his name
- Saint-Eustache, Quebec
- Sint Eustatius, a Caribbean Netherlands island named after Saint Eustace

== Sources ==
- Hibbard, Laura A., Medieval Romance in England, New York, Burt Franklin, 1963
- Hourihane, Colum (2002). Insights and Interpretations: Studies in Celebration of the Eighty-fifth Anniversary of the Index of Christian Art. Princeton University Press. ISBN 9780691099910.

== Gallery ==
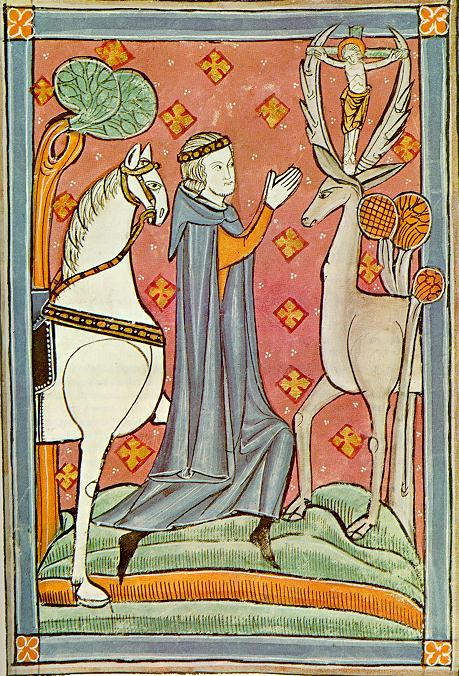
Saint Eustace, from a 13th-century English manuscript.

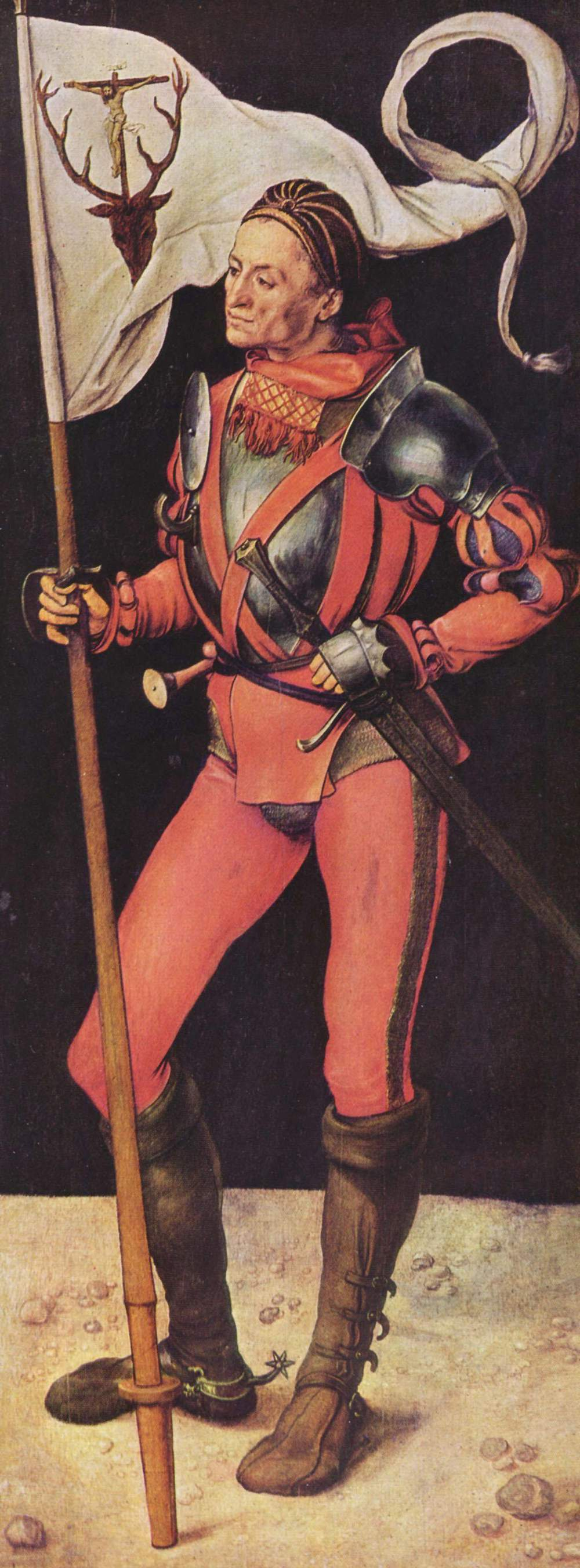
On a wing of the Paumgartner altarpiece, Albrecht Dürer painted Lukas Paumgartner with the banner of his patron, St. Eustace, in the contemporary armor of a Landsknecht.

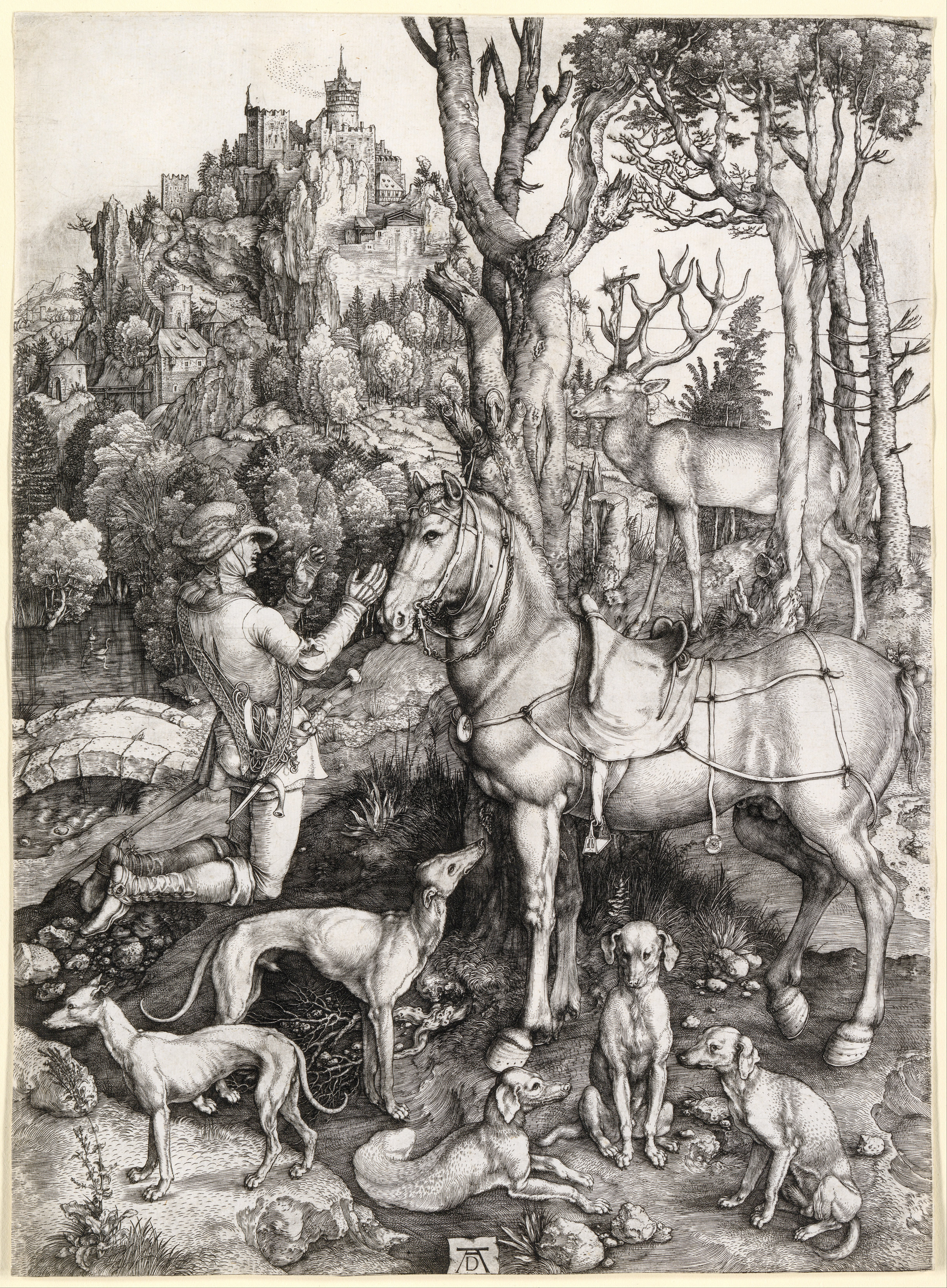
Saint Eustachius, an engraving by Albrecht Dürer, ca. 1501. As in the Pisanello above, he kneels before a stag with a cross in its antlers, surrounded by dogs, including greyhounds.

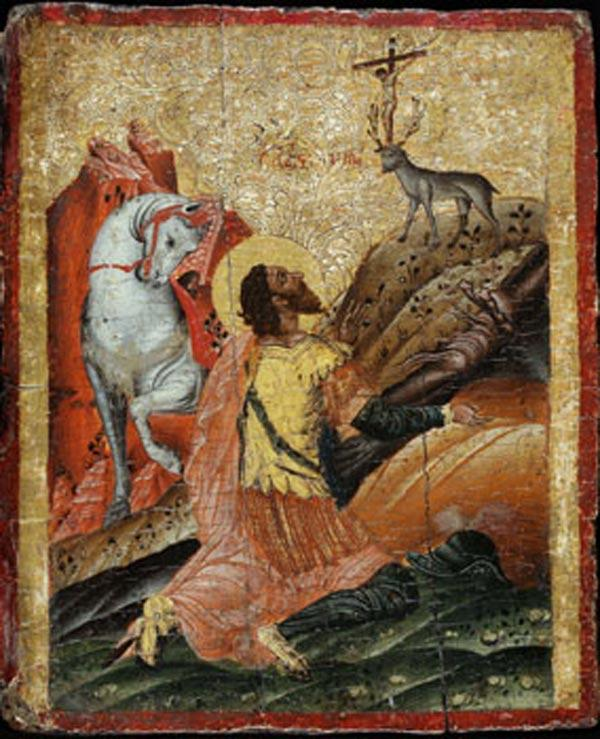
Saint Eustace icon, an example of the Cretan School.

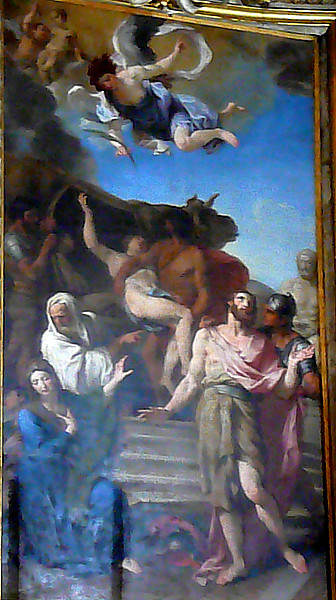
Francesco Ferdinandi, The Martyrdom of St. Eustace. Located behind the main altar at the Church of Sant'Eustachio, Rome, this painting follows the narrative in the Golden Legend: For refusing to sacrifice to the gods, St. Eustace and his wife and sons are to be enclosed in a Brazen bull which will be heated until they die.

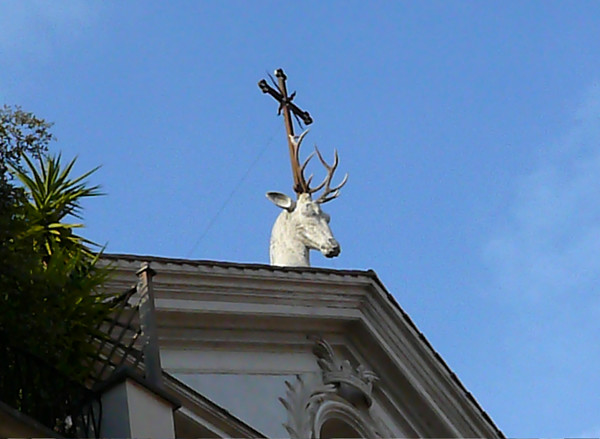
The stag-and-cross symbol of

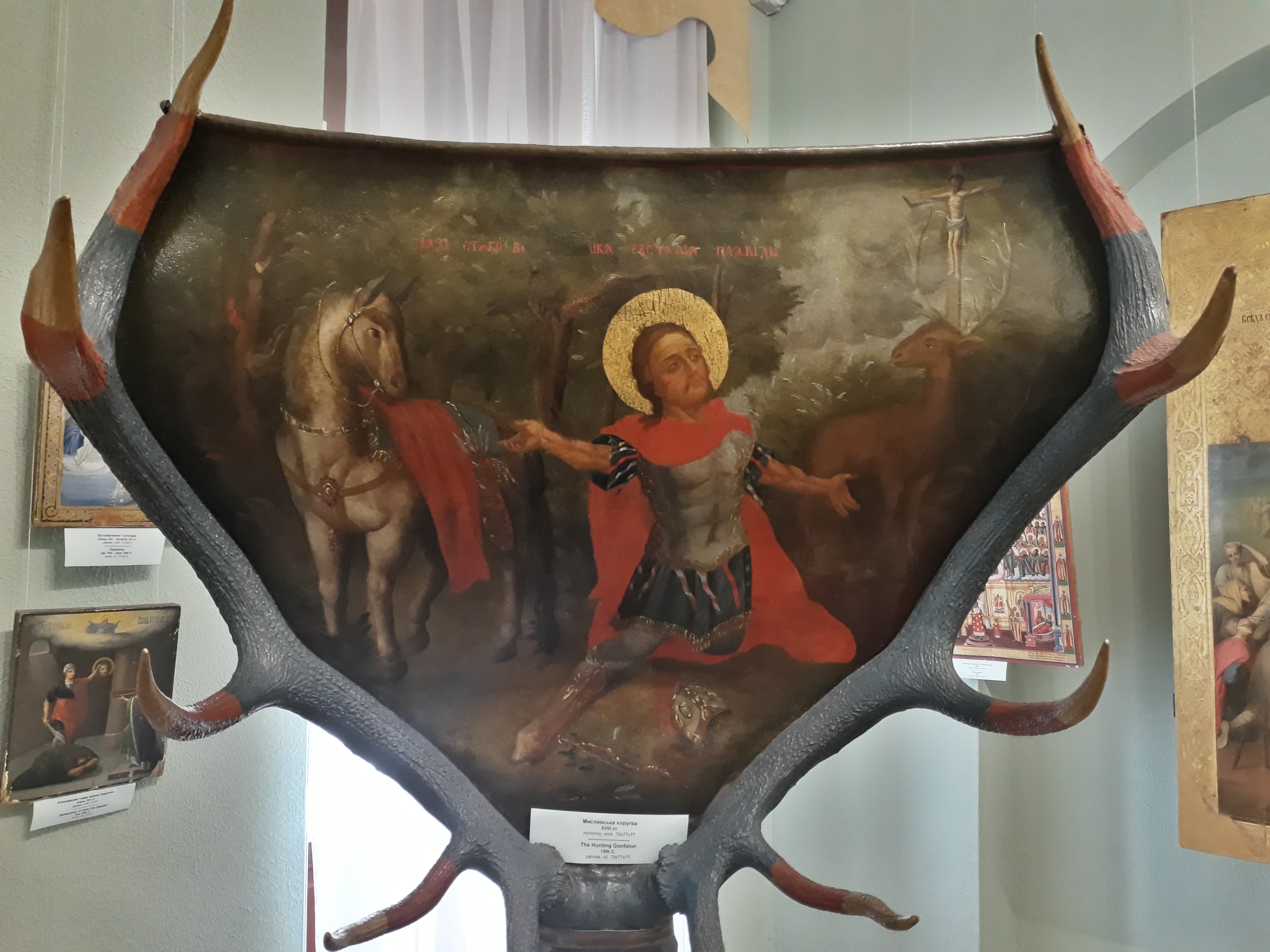
The Hunting Gonfalon, 18th C., Ukraine
