= Giuseppe Gandolfo =

Italian painter (1792–1855)

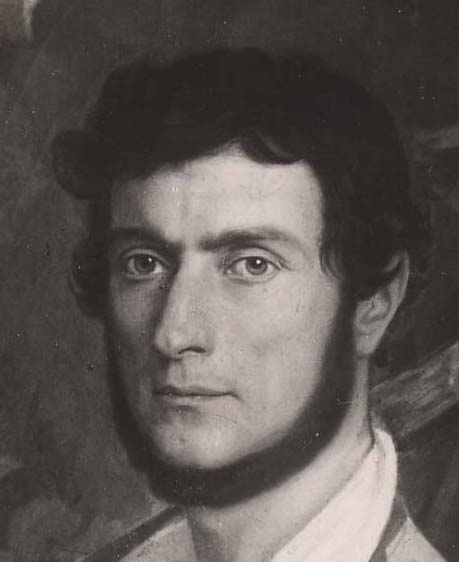
Giuseppe Gandolfo, self-portrait

Giuseppe Gandolfo (28 August 1792 – 13 September 1855) was an Italian painter, active mainly in Sicily in a Neoclassical style. He became an important figure in the artistic life of nineteenth-century Catania, particularly as a portrait painter and teacher.

== Biography ==
Gandolfo was born in Catania, Sicily. After an early literary education, he studied chiselling and goldsmithing while also attending the drawing school of the painter Matteo Desiderato. During this period he produced a small bronze bust of the Catanese poet Domenico Tempio.

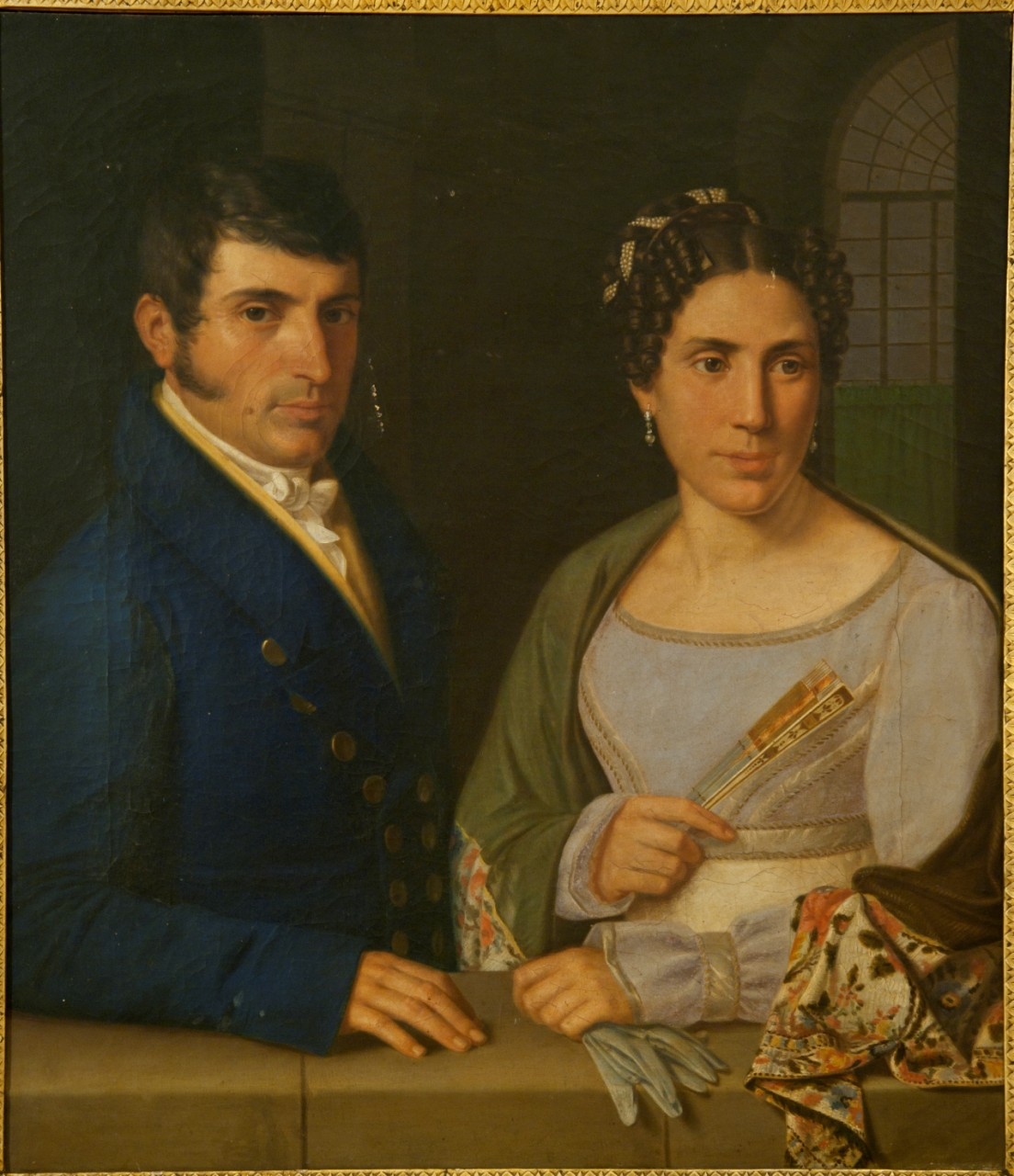
Giuseppe Gandolfo, Portraits of his brother Gaetano and Gaetano's wife, Maria Arrigo

At the age of twenty-seven he moved to Rome, where he studied under Giuseppe Errante. In 1820 he continued his training in Florence under Pietro Benvenuti. He became known for copies after Raphael, Correggio and Titian, several of which were commissioned by the British ambassador and sent to London. He also received commissions connected with the court of Grand Duke Ferdinand III of Tuscany.

Gandolfo returned to Catania in 1821 following the death of his father. After a brief return to Florence in 1822, recurrent illness compelled him to settle permanently in Sicily. In Catania he painted portraits, landscapes, religious subjects and genre scenes. He was also known for a satirical group composition representing prominent Catanese intellectuals and professionals as monks gathered in a refectory. In 1852 he painted an eruption of Mount Etna from direct observation.

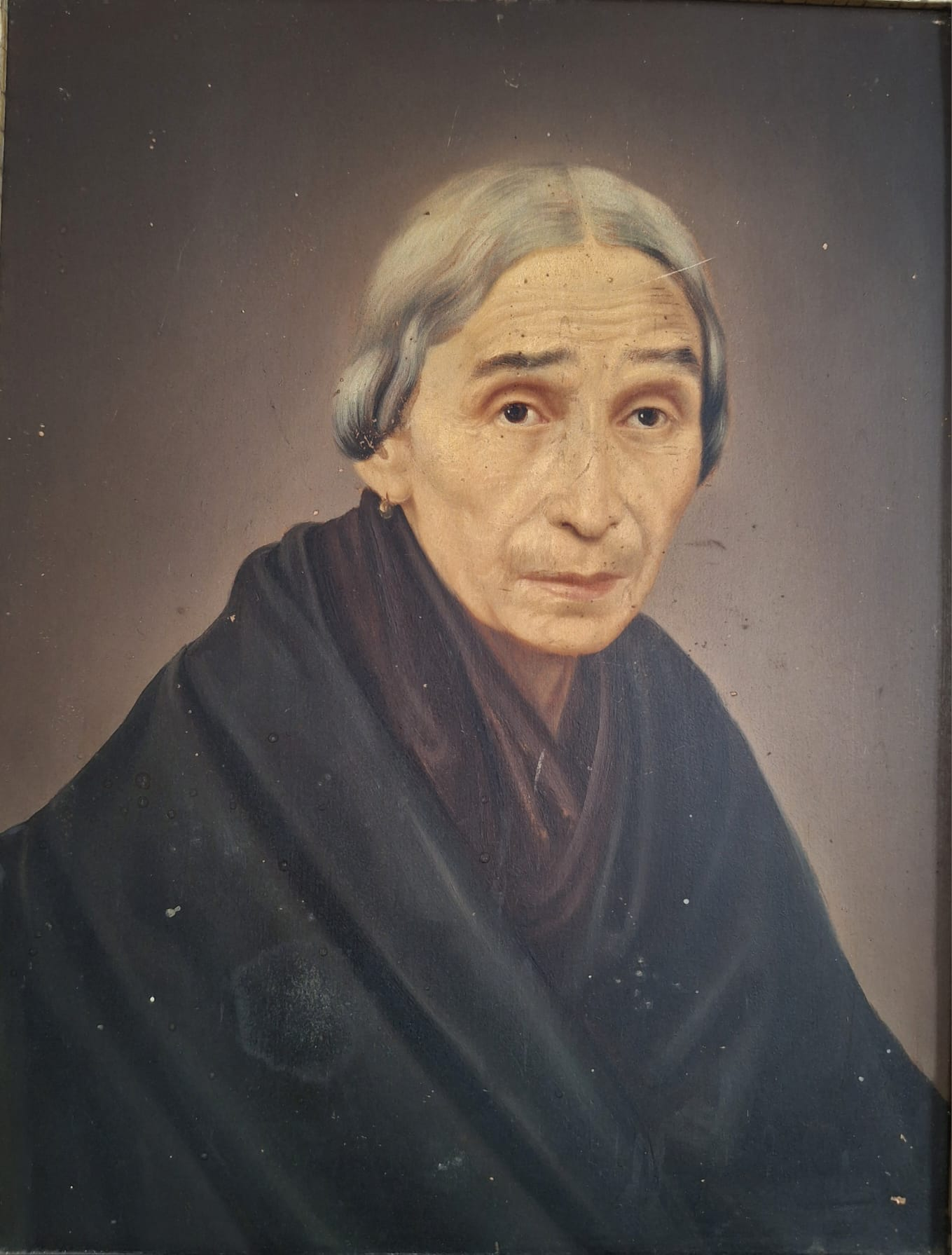
Giuseppe Gandolfo, Portrait of Giuseppina Consoli, mother of Francesco Di Bartolo, oil on panel, Natalia Di Bartolo Collection

He became an important point of reference for younger artists in Catania, where no established art school yet existed. His pupils included Salvatore Zurria, Nunzio Licciardello, his nephew Antonino Gandolfo, Giuseppe Sciuti and Francesco Di Bartolo. Di Bartolo received from Gandolfo his first training in drawing before continuing his education in engraving in Naples.

Gandolfo died in Catania on 13 September 1855.

== Works and collections ==
Gandolfo was particularly appreciated for his portraits.

The Museo Civico di Castello Ursino in Catania preserves several portraits by Gandolfo, including those of Carmelo Mirone, Anna Brancaleone, Raffaele Zappalà Finocchiaro and Giacomo Di Bartolo. Other works are held by the University of Catania, the Pinacoteca Zelantea in Acireale and the Biblioteca Comunale di Palermo. A copy after Raphael's Portrait of Pope Leo X with Two Cardinals is displayed at the National Museum of Capodimonte in Naples.

== Bibliography ==
- Barbera, Gioacchino (1999). "Gandolfo (Gandolfi), Giuseppe". Dizionario Biografico degli Italiani (in Italian). Vol. 52. Rome: Istituto dell'Enciclopedia Italiana.
- Di Bartolo, Natalia (2026). "Francesco Di Bartolo (1826–1913), incisore e pittore: corpus fondante e corpus di saggi per il Bicentenario della nascita". OperaeOpera (in Italian).
- Sarullo, Luigi (1993). Spadaro, Maria Antonietta (ed.). Dizionario degli artisti siciliani: Pittura (in Italian). Vol. 2. Palermo: Novecento Editrice. ISBN 88-373-0197-9.
