= Book of the Knight Zifar =

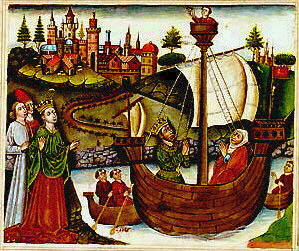
A miniature from the Paris manuscript of the Book of the Knight Zifar

The Book of the Knight Zifar (originally Livro del cavallero Cifar, in modern orthography Libro del caballero Zifar) is the earliest fictional adventure tale in prose in the Spanish language. It was written around 1300, probably by a cleric of Toledo, Ferrand Martínez (not Ferrand Martínez, Archdeacon of Écija), who is mentioned in the prologue. The book has much affinity with contemporary works of chivalric romance.

The Book of the Knight Zifar has been transmitted in two manuscripts. The first is a fifteenth-century codex known by the letter "M", and catalogued as MS. 11.309 in the Biblioteca Nacional de España in Madrid. The second is Spanish MS. 36, called codex "P", in the Bibliothèque Nationale de France in Paris. The latter, compiled in 1464, is generally referred to simply as the "Paris manuscript" and is well-illustrated with colourful miniatures. Two further examples of the Knight Zifar printed in Seville in 1512 survive.

The book is an adaptation of the legendary life of Saint Eustace, who before his conversion was a Roman general named Placidus (Plácidas in Spanish). The knight Zifar is a medieval Placidus-cum-Eustace, and his story shares in part the didactic function of Eustacian hagiography, but in other respects is epic and chivalric. After being separated from his family, Zifar finds himself King of Menton. His son Roboam, after receiving an education, is separated from his family, only to end up emperor.

== Modern editions ==
The edition of Wagner (1929) is still definitive, and was reproduced, with minor modifications, by both Riquer (1951) and Buendía (1961).

- Heinrich Michelant. Historia del Cavallero Cifar. Bibliothek des Litterarischen Vereins in Stuttgart, CXII. Tübingen: 1872.
- Charles Philip Wagner. El Libro del Caballero Zifar. Ann Arbour: University of Michigan Press, 1929.
- Martín de Riquer. El Caballero Zifar. Selecciones Bibliófilas. Barcelona: Ariel, 1951.
- Felicidad Buendía. Libros de Caballerías españoles: El Caballero Cifar, Amadís de Gaula, Tirant el Blanco. Madrid: Aguilar, 1960.
- Joaquín González Muela. Libro del Caballero Zifar, 2nd ed. Madrid: Castalia, 1990 [1982].
- Cristina González. Libro del Caballero Zifar. Madrid: Cátedra, 1983.
- Charles L. Nelson. The Book of the Knight Zifar: a Translation of El Libro del Cavallero Zifar. Lexington: The University Press of Kentucky, 1983 and 2015. Sample
- M. A. Olsen. Libro del Cavallero Çifar. Madison: HSMS, 1984.
- Manuel Moleiro y Francisco Rico. Libro del caballero Zifar. Códice de París. Barcelona: Moleiro, 1996. Online
