= Reliquary of Saint Eustace =

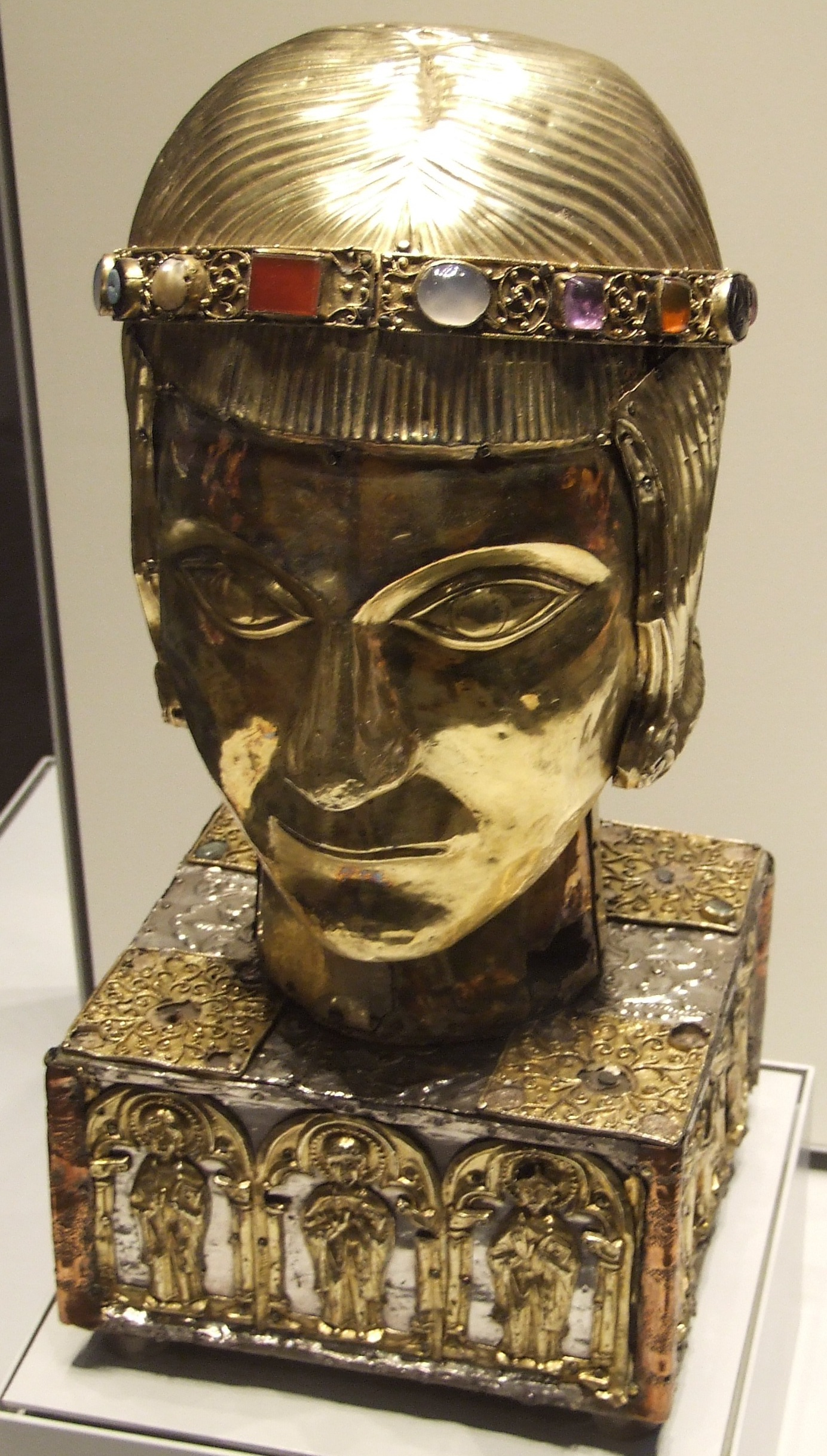
- Reliquary head of Saint Eustace
- Material: Silver-gilt
- Size: 35 cm high
- Created: 12th Century AD
- Present location: British Museum, London
- Registration: 1850,1127.1

The Reliquary of Saint Eustace is a medieval silver and wooden holy container in the shape of Saint Eustace's head that once formed part of Basel Minster's treasury. The treasury was acquired by the Canton of Basel in 1836 and shortly afterwards sold at auction to collectors and museums across Europe. The reliquary was later bought by the British Museum.

== History ==
Scholars have placed the construction of the head between 1180 and 1200 AD. For centuries the reliquary belonged to the cathedral treasury of Basel in Switzerland, where it was first recorded in 1477. It was sold, along with the rest of the treasury, in 1836, shortly after their acquisition by the canton of Basel. After passing through several owners, it was purchased by the British Museum in 1850.

== Description ==
The main image shows the repoussé silver-gilt cover of the reliquary modelled in the shape of the saint's head, and is adorned with a headband composed of glass and various precious and semi-precious stones. Around the base, twelve gold figures of the Apostles stand within intricate arcading. Inside was a contemporary sycamore wooden case with a hollow compartment that held the relics of various saints and fragments of a skull that may have been from the head of Saint Eustace, all of which were wrapped in pieces of cloth dated to the 13th century. The wooden head and relics were only discovered when the outer silver case was being cleaned in 1956.

== Discovery of Relics ==
Until 1956, it was not known that the head was, in fact, a reliquary. While the conservators were aware that the bust was constructed from a wooden core surrounded by silver-gilt, they had not investigated the wooden core until the 1950's when the case was due for restoration. During the restoration process, it was discovered that the top of the wooden core's head was removable, and contained inside it several forgotten relics. The relics themselves were returned to Basel Cathedral, while the cloths remained in the collection of the British Museum.

== Gallery ==
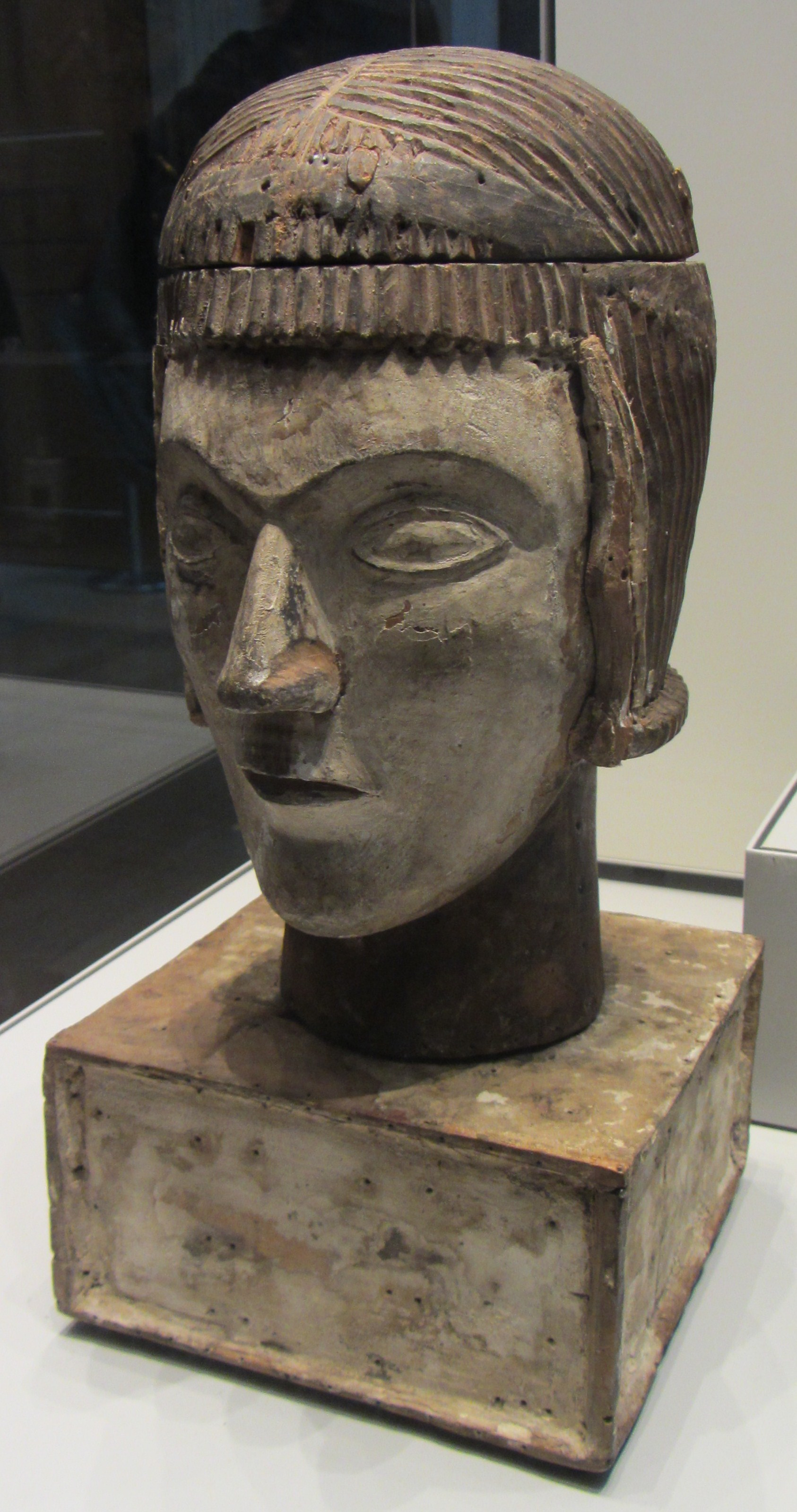
Wooden head of St. Eustace that may have held his relics.
