= Giuseppe Errante =

Italian painter

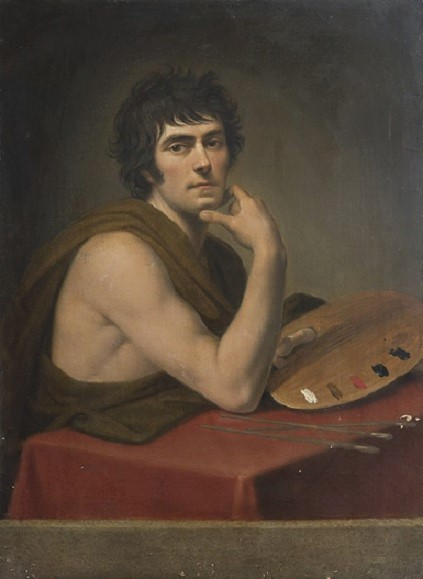
- Self-portrait, 1790s
- Born: 19 March 1760; Trapani, Kingdom of Sicily
- Died: 16 February 1821 (aged 60); Rome, Papal States
- Known for: Painting
- Movement: Neoclassicism

Giuseppe Errante (March 19, 1760 – February 16, 1821) was an Italian Neoclassical painter.

== Biography ==
=== Early life and education ===
He was born in Trapani, Sicily. His father was a merchant in animal skins, and because of his habit of drawing on the hides Giuseppe was nicknamed ‘guastacuoi’. He had a period of apprenticeship with the sculptor Domenico Nolfo in Trapani and continued his studies in Palermo with the painter Padre Fedele da San Biagio (1717–1801) and later with Gioacchino Martorana.

On returning to Trapani, he painted the picture the Virgin of Carmel Liberating the Souls in Purgatory. After a brief stay in Naples he moved to Rome, where, under the protection of Antonio Canova, he studied perspective and architectural drawing with the architect Giuseppe Barberi. Errante became moderately prosperous because he also executed miniatures, as well as making copies of—and restoring—Old Master paintings.

=== Early career ===
The first painting Errante completed in Rome is dated 1784: St. Vincenzo, the altarpiece for Santi Vincenzo e Anastasio alla Regola, which is characterized by its neat drawing and smooth tonal transitions. In the same period for the Palazzo Altieri he painted a fresco showing Cupid and Psyche, in which the Rococo sense of decoration is marked by a fine and soft colouring. In 1786 he began the fresco of the cupola of the Chiesa della Morte at Civitavecchia, completed in 1788, following a period of interruption during which he was married in Trapani. This major work depicting the Souls in Purgatory recalls Baroque decoration and is enriched with festive Rococo elements showing garlands of flowers and diminutive angels. Also in the same church are two other works that have been attributed to Errante: a banner with the Madonna and Child and Souls in Purgatory on one side and the Archangel Michael Appearing to Saints Gregory the Great and Roch on the other, as well as a canvas with the Madonna and Child and St. Joseph (both 1786–8).

Errante returned to Rome for the conclusion of his studies, receiving an annual pension and living at the Palazzo della Farnesina, both privileges from Ferdinand IV, King of Naples. InBy 1791, he was employed in the Caserta Palace, Naples. In Naples, he met Jacob Philipp Hackert. On account of his political intrigues, he was obliged to flee Naples. He stayed in Ancona, where for the bishop, Cardinal Vincenzo Ranuzzi, he executed various portraits and the painting of Saints Philip and James (finally completed in Milan, 1796; Ancona, church of St, James).

=== In Milan ===
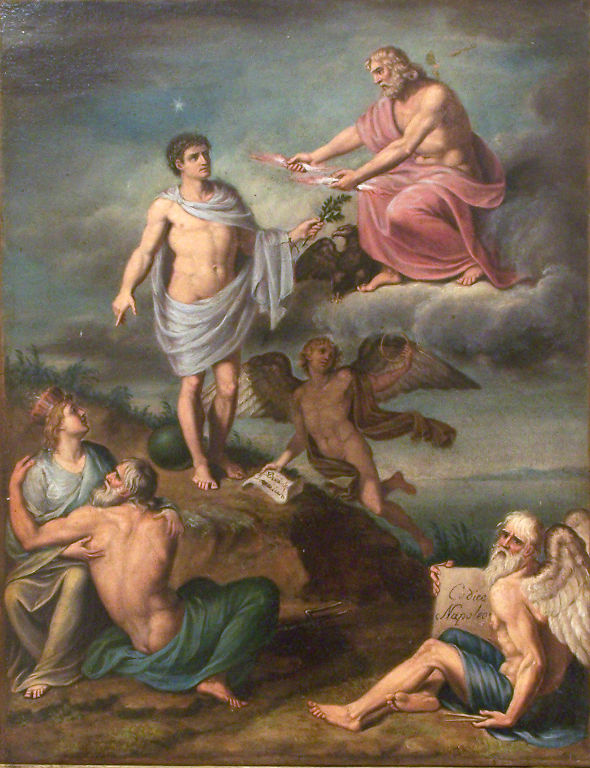
Supremazia di Napoleone, oil on canvas, 1805-1806, Museo Pepoli, Trapani

Giuseppe Errante arrived in Milan at the end of August 1795. There his painting style moved towards Neo-classicism, passing from delicate colours and shading to work that is smooth and sleek but without chiaroscuro. He painted a large body of pictures on a wide variety of themes, thus achieving considerable popularity. Among his many portraits are those of his patron the Duca di Monte Leone and that of Dr G. A. Borgnes, in whose collection there were at least 15 pictures by Errante.

In 1804 three of Errante’s works were sent to Paris: the Mourning Artemisia, Sleeping Endymion and Psyche. In 1806 he contributed two pictures, the Death of Count Ugolino and another Mourning Artemisia, to the exhibition at the Brera Academy, held on the occasion of Napoleon’s visit to Milan. His picture depicting the Death of Antigone was one of his most celebrated works.

=== Later career ===
The climate of Milan affected his delicate health, and he decided to return to Rome. There he renewed contacts with Ferdinand IV, who proposed to him the opening of an academy and also commissioned a ceiling in one of the rooms in the royal palace at Caserta. Neither of these projects was realized by the artist, who was unwilling to leave Rome. In 1815 he published a letter on colour and in 1817 an essay on the same subject; during the same period he wrote a plan for a new Accademia di Belle Arti. Francesco Cancellieri wrote a posthumous biography of the painter in 1824. Among his pupils in Rome was Giuseppe Gandolfo and in Sicily Giuseppe Mazzarese.

== Bibliography ==
- Barbera, Gioacchino (1993). "ERRANTE, Giuseppe". Dizionario Biografico degli Italiani (in Italian). Vol. 43: Enzo–Fabrizi. Rome: Istituto dell'Enciclopedia Italiana. ISBN 978-88-12-00032-6.
