= Tsebelda iconostasis =

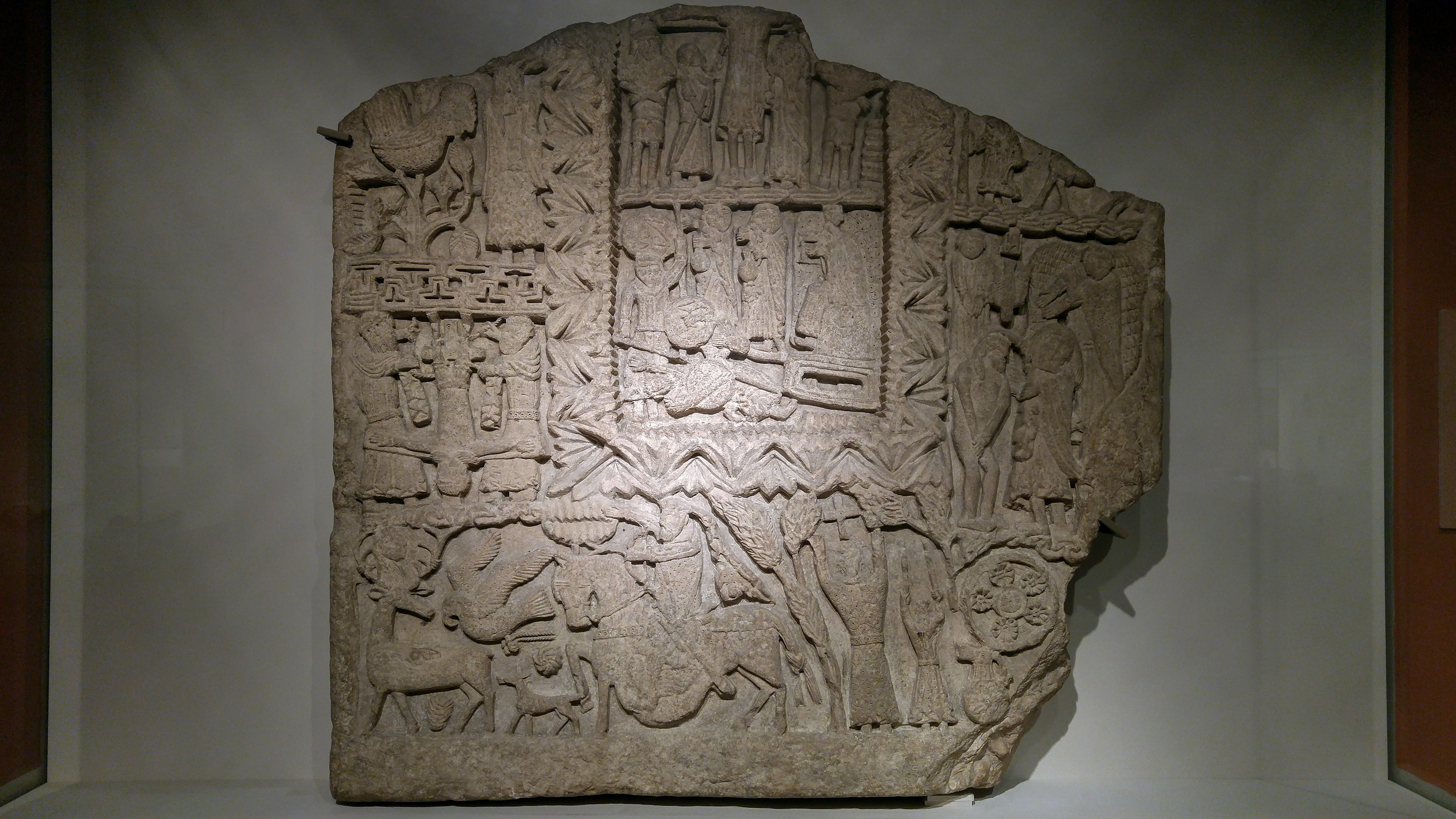
Tsebelda iconostasis at the Georgian National Museum.

The Tsebelda iconostasis (Georgian: წებელდას კანკელი, romanized: ts'ebeldas k'ank'eli) is part of an iconostasis and an early medieval piece of Christian art from Abkhazia, Georgia, a limestone fragment of an altar screen from the 7th or 8th century, which were discovered near the village of Tsebelda in the 1880s.

The two largest surviving fragments are on display at the Georgian National Museum in Tbilisi, with smaller pieces also kept at a museum in Sukhumi. Within a floral frame are depiction of the Crucifixion and the Resurrection. On the left side are two scenes from the life of Saint Peter, while on the right side there is part of the Sacrifice of Abraham with the baptism of Jesus below it. The diversity of biblical repertoire depicted on the Tsebelda iconostasis is rare in the Christian art of that time. The mode and technique of execution display affinities with similar items found elsewhere in Georgia.
