= Luigi Trombetta =

His Eminence Luigi Trombetta
- Secretary of the Congregation of Bishops and Regulars
- Church: Roman Catholic Church
- Appointed: 24 December 1896
- Term ended: 17 January 1900
- Predecessor: Luigi Sepiacci
- Successor: None; office suppressed
- Other post: Cardinal-Deacon of Sant'Eustachio (1899-1900)

Orders
- Ordination: March 1844
- Created cardinal: 19 June 1899 by Pope Leo XIII
- Rank: Cardinal-Deacon

Personal details
- Born: Luigi Trombetta; 3 February 1820 Città Lavinia, Papal States
- Died: 17 January 1900 (aged 79) Palazzo Morosini, Rome, Kingdom of Italy
- Buried: Campo Verano
- Parents: Giovanni Trombetta; Dorotea di Pietro

Luigi Trombetta (3 February 1820 – 17 January 1900) was an Italian cardinal.

He was ordained as a priest in March 1844. He received his doctorate in utroque iure (both canon and civil law). He was made a canon of the chapter of the Patriarchal Basilica of Liberia, and in May 1877, he was appointed Apostolic Protonotary. In February 1863, he became undersecretary of the Congregation for Bishops and Regulars; by December 1896, he was secretary of this congregation.

In June 1899, he was created Cardinal of Sant'Eustachio by Pope Leo XIII; he died six months later and was buried in the Campo Verano cemetery in Rome.
