= Francesco Fernandi =

Italian painter (1679–1740)

Francesco Fernandi (1679–1740), also known as Imperiali, was an Italian painter of the late-Baroque or Rococo period.

== Biography ==
Born in Milan, he initially apprenticed with the painter for the Borromeo family, Carlo Vimercati. After a spell in Palermo, of which little is known, he moved to Rome sometime around 1705. There he joined projects of the large studio of painters working with Carlo Maratta. He was patronized in Rome by the Cardinal Giuseppe Renato Imperiali, from whom he acquired the last name Imperiali. We know little of his works for the Vatican and the Ottoboni family.

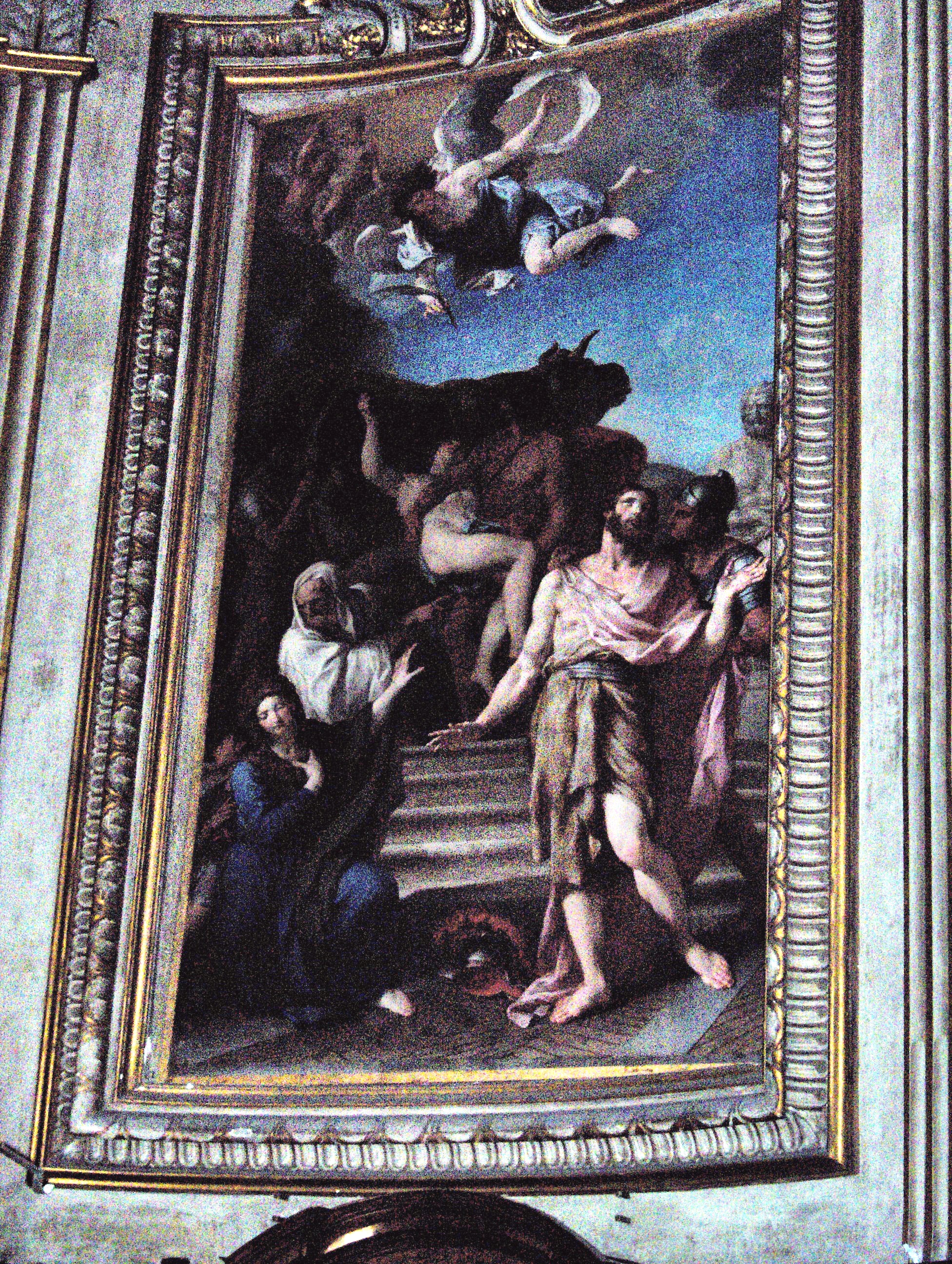
Martyrdom of St Eustachius, Church of Sant'Eustachio, Rome

In Rome, he gained an independent studio, and was apparently popular with visiting British painters, having mentored Allan Ramsay and William Hoare, among others. Among his Italian pupils is the little-known, Camillo Paderni and the more prominent Pompeo Batoni. In August 1723, he apparently backed the litigation and lobbying by the academic outsiders (non-members of the Accademia di San Luca in Rome) like Michelangelo Cerruti, who sought to liberalize the control over artistic production held by the Academy. He himself was appointed along with his friend, Agostino Masucci to the Academy in 1723. He appears to have mastered painting a diversity of themes and styles, and is described by his biographer Niccolò Pio as having worked in:

all kinds of the natural things, to perfection, and with diligence, and without academicism, (he paints) all kinds of Animals, and Fish both plural and singular, likewise fruits, Flowers, Cristalware, gold and silver goblets, tapestries, vistas, and landscapes ... Historical paintings and anything else that falls into his hands....

He painted a large altarpiece for the church of Sant'Eustachio in Rome in 1720–24. He also painted the two canvases flanking the altarpiece (Martyrdom and Decapitation of the name saints, in the chapel of Saints Valentine and Hilary in the Viterbo Cathedral. He painted an altarpiece (c. 1730) for the church of San Francesco in Gubbio and a Death of San Romualdo for San Gregorio al Celio in Rome. A Madonana and child of the Rosary with Saints Jerome, Domenic & Francis (c. 1732) in Sant'Andrea in Vetralla, near Viterbo, is attributed to Imperiali.

In 1735, Filippo Juvarra requested eight large canvases depicting allegorical virtues of a ruler for the throne room in the royal palace of La Granja in Spain. He commissioned paintings from Solimena, Lemoyne, Trevisani, Costanzi, Masucci, Pittoni, Creti and Parodi. Two of the painters had to be replaced. Lemoyne died and was replaced by Carle Vanloo; while Parodi's fees were too costly, and Imperiali was instead awarded the commission for Liberality or Alexander rewarding his officers. Imperiali died in Rome in 1740.

== See also ==
- Sebastiano Conca
- Agostino Masucci
- Jacopo Zoboli
- Pompeo Batoni
