= Sisto Riario Sforza =

Italian cardinal (1810–1877)

Venerable Sisto Riario Sforza
- Cardinal, Archbishop of Naples
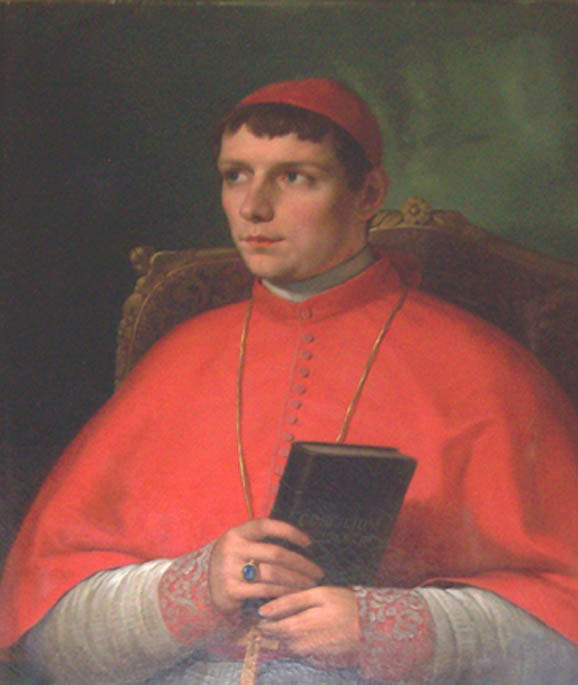
- Archdiocese: Naples
- See: Naples
- Appointed: 24 November 1845
- Installed: 8 December 1845
- Term ended: 29 September 1877
- Predecessor: Filippo Giudice Caracciolo
- Successor: Guglielmo Sanfelice d'Acquavilla
- Other post: Cardinal-Priest of Santa Sabina (1846–77)
- Previous posts: Bishop of Aversa (1845); Camerlengo of the College of Cardinals (1865–66)

Orders
- Ordination: 1 September 1833 by Filippo Guidice Caracciolo
- Consecration: 25 May 1845 by Mario Mattei
- Created cardinal: 19 January 1846 by Pope Gregory XVI
- Rank: Cardinal-Priest

Personal details
- Born: Sisto Riario Sforza; 5 December 1810 Naples, Kingdom of Naples
- Died: 29 September 1877 (aged 66) Naples, Kingdom of Italy
- Education: Pontifical Roman Major Seminary; Pontifical Ecclesiastical Academy; La Sapienza University
- Coat of arms: Sisto Riario Sforza's coat of arms

Ordination history of Sisto Riario Sforza
History
Diaconal ordination
- Ordained by: Giuseppe della Porta Rodiani
Priestly ordination
- Ordained by: Filippo Giudice Caracciolo
Episcopal consecration
- Principal consecrator: Mario Mattei
- Co-consecrators: Ludovico Tevoli; Luigi Maria Cardelli, O.F.M. Ref.
Cardinalate
- Elevated by: Pope Gregory XVI
Episcopal succession
Bishops consecrated by Sisto Riario Sforza as principal consecrator
- Giuseppe de' Bianchi Dottula: 4 March 1849
- Gennaro di Giacomo: 4 March 1849
- Leonardo Moccia: 4 March 1849
- Giuseppe Pappalardo: 10 June 1849
- Gennaro Acciardi: 10 June 1849
- Luigi Vetta: 10 June 1849
- Camillo Monteforte: 10 June 1849
- Pasquale Taccone: 14 October 1849
- Ignazio de' Bisogno: 16 December 1849
- Ignazio Maria Selitti: 16 December 1849
- Antonio de Simone: 16 December 1849
- Francesco Saverio Petagna: 16 June 1850
- Raffaele Carbonelli: 16 June 1850
- Tommaso Michele Salzano, O.P.: 12 March 1854
- Giandomenico Falcone: 1 August 1858
- Gennaro de Vivo: 17 May 1874
- Salvatore Maria Nisio, Sch. P.: 3 October 1875

Sisto Riario Sforza (5 December 1810 – 29 September 1877) was an Italian Roman Catholic cardinal who served as the Archbishop of Naples from 1845 until his death. Sforza's rapid rise through the Church ranks began with various appointments before he served as the Bishop of Aversa for seven months. He was promoted to the Naples archdiocese and cardinalate. After two months, Sisto became a close supporter of Pope Pius IX and a vocal participant in the First Vatican Council.

He opposed Italian unification and was temporarily exiled from Naples after unification when he refused to adhere to the requests that the new government made of him. He used this time in exile to travel and to set up a private network to create periodical publications to oppose the anticlerical press coming from his archdiocese. He was later allowed to return and carried out his duties, such as aiding victims of two cholera epidemics and the 1861 eruption of Mount Vesuvius. Towards the end of his life there were rumours that the French, who were preparing for a papal conclave to be held outside of Rome (due to the Italian unification), were aiming to propose Sforza as a papal contender. Sforza died just five months before Pope Leo XIII was elected, despite Pope Leo XIII's objection to becoming pope while Sforza was still alive, as Sforza would have opposed Pecci's candidature.

His beatification process was launched in the 1920s and culminated on 28 June 2012, after Pope Benedict XVI recognized his heroic virtue and titled him as Venerable.

== Life ==
=== House ===
Sisto Riario Sforza was born in Naples on 5 December 1810 into the noble Riario-Sforza House as the younger of two brothers; his older brother was Nicola Giovanni. His parents were Duke Giovanni Antonio Riario Sforza and Maria Gaetana Cattaneo della Volta. His noble house was related to the Caracciolo house as well as the Colonna and Boncompagni families. He was a nephew to the Cardinal Tommaso Riario Sforza and many of his ancestors such as Pietro Riario (a Franciscan), Raffaele Riario, and Alessandro Riario had been cardinals.

Sforza's baptism was celebrated on the date of his birth in the San Giorgio Genovesi church and he was baptized with the names "Sisto Gaetano Ambrosio". He received the sacrament of Confirmation on 11 February 1822 in Naples.

=== Education and priesthood ===
He decided to enter the ecclesial life in late 1824 and moved to Rome, where he would be educated under the presence of his cardinal uncle.

He spent his education in Rome first at the Pontifical Roman Major before attending the Pontifical Ecclesiastical Institute and the La Sapienza college where he went on to obtain a theological doctorate through an apostolic brief on 23 April 1845. Sforza later received the ecclesiastical habit on 1 January 1825; his hair was shaved at the top for the clerical tonsure a month after on 13 February which he received from Cardinal Luigi Ruffo-Scilla. Sforza received the minor orders from Scilla on 25 December 1826 and later the subdiaconate from Giuseppe della Porta Rodiani on 21 April 1832 (in the Basilica of Saint John Lateran) before Rodiani invested Sforza into the diaconate on 22 December 1832. He received his ordination to the priesthood in Naples on 1 September 1833 from Filippo Giudice Caracciolo.

He commenced his pastoral duties in evening schools, worked in prisons for women, and also worked alongside apprentices. He served as a papal legate in Paris in 1836 to present the red biretta to new Cardinal Jean-Louis Lefebvre de Cheverus, returning from France that 27 June.

Sforza first worked for some time as a chamberlain to the pope (since November 1836) and in 1828 was made the "abbot commendatario" for the San Paolo in Albano convent (he took possession of the convent on 12 February 1828). In addition, he was also named as the vicar of the cardinal camerlengo in the school of Santa Maria in Via Lata Latain on 22 June 1837. In 1829 he served as a conclavist for his cardinal uncle at the conclave that elected Pope Pius VIII. On 30 September 1838 he was made a canon for Saint Peter's Basilica, and in 1841 was made the private aide to the pope. Sforza later accompanied the pontiff on the latter's September 1841 trip to Umbria and Rieti in 1842. He contributed to the conversion to Roman Catholicism of the count Ernst von Stackelberg and the return to the Church of prince Augustin Petrovich Galitzin.

=== Episcopate ===
On 12 April 1845, King Ferdinando II proposed to the pope that Sforza assume the see of Bishopric of Aversa, which he took on 24 April. Sforza received his episcopal consecration as a bishop one month later on 24 May in a side chapel in Saint Peter's Basilica from Mario Mattei and co-consecrators Ludovico Tevoli and Luigi Maria Cardelli. Sforza assumed possession of his new see via a procurator on 7 May before taking his oath of allegiance to the king on 12 June; his formal entrance into his diocese was celebrated on 21 June.

Sforza was made an Assistant at the Pontifical Throne one month after his episcopal appointment on 17 May and was promoted to the metropolitan archdiocese of Naples on 24 November, concluding a rapid ascension through the ranks. This appointment was confirmed after Ferdinando II proposed him to the Pope to take the Naples see on 6 September. The pope sent him the pallium as the archbishop on 24 November while naming him the archdiocese's head. He was enthroned in his new archdiocese at a formal Mass held on 8 December 1845. The culmination to his rise through the ranks came in 1846 after the pope elevated him into the cardinalate; he received a special dispensation for having an uncle who was a cardinal since the rules did not allow relations to both act as cardinals. He received the red hat and his titular church of Santa Sabina on 16 April 1846.

The pope sent him the red biretta via the "ablegato" Count Annibale Moroni. The "ablegato" gave the biretta to Ferdinando II to bestow upon Sforza on 5 February 1846. It was in the following months in 1846 that Sforza founded the "Academia de filosofia Tomista".

He participated in the papal conclave in 1846 that elected Pope Pius IX. Pius IX later named Sforza as a member of the cardinalitial commission that he created and charged with preparing a definition of the dogma of the Immaculate Conception. The work of that commission resulted in the declaration and definition of the dogma in the pope's apostolic constitution Ineffabilis Deus. In 1855 he refused the pope's offer to become the newest Archbishop of Bologna.

Sforza distinguished himself in the two cholera epidemics in 1854-55 and 1873 in tending to the ill while tending to victims of the 1861 eruption of Mount Vesuvius. Sforza became titled "Borromeo redivivo" since people associated his pastoral qualities as reminiscent to those of Saint Carlo Borromeo. The Neapolitan episcopate gifted Sforza with a stole that had once belonged to Borromeo on 2 February 1862.

Sforza was exiled following the collapse of the Kingdom of the Two Sicilies from 21 September to 30 November 1860 after he refused to adhere to the demands of the new government. Upon Giuseppe Garibaldi's entrance into Naples on 7 September 1860, the cardinal issued a letter expressing his opposition to Italian unification. He also opposed the dissolution of the Papal States and supported Pius IX during that turbulent period. He returned to Naples on 30 November 1860 with the aid of Saint Ludovico of Casoria. Sforza was exiled once again on 31 July 1861 until 6 December 1866. During his exile he lived in Genoa and Marseille (where he resided with the bishop Patrice-François-Marie Cruice) for a time before moving to Hyères and Civitavecchia before settling in Rome. In 1865, he was consulted in Rome about plans to convene a council where he presented a project for the reform of the local church in the south with 37 other southern Italian bishops. Before his exile ended he organized a network of periodical publications in opposition to the anticlerical and liberal press. He also arranged for new priests who had just been ordained from Naples to see him in Rome to know them better.

Sforza participated in the First Vatican Council where he spoke out against the decision to proclaim the dogma of papal infallibility; Sforza tried to compromise and proposed a more mitigated doctrine which was not accepted in the council, though he was one of many who shared this view.

In 1876, he inaugurated the Ospizio di Maria and established a retirement home for priests. He also invited a range of religious orders to settle and work in his archdiocese.

In June 1875, the diplomat Emilio Visconti Venosta sent a letter to his ambassador to Paris in which he expressed his concern that the French might be pushing Sforza as a potential papal candidate in a conclave that would be held outside of Rome according to him. Venosta described Sforza as "narrow-minded and of limited intelligence" and said that it was probable that Sforza would fall under the influence of the Jesuits. He continued in expressing his fear that Sforza as a potential pope would model his pontificate on the same line of conduct as Pius IX. Venosta stated that "the likelihood of the election of Cardinal Riario repels me" while pointing to Gioacchino Pecci as the candidate who deserved to be pope.

=== Death ===
The cardinal died from cardiac difficulties at the end of a month-long illness on 29 September 1877 in Naples; his remains were exposed then buried in the church of Santa Maria del Pianto and the Naples Cathedral before being moved to their final resting place in the chapel of the SS. Crocifisso in the church of SS. XII Apostoli in April 1927. Pius IX mourned Sforza's death and referred to the late cardinal as his "right arm". Pope Leo XIII later mused that he would not be elected pope with Cardinal Riario Sforza alive; Leo XIII was elected in 1878 a few months after the cardinal had died.

== Beatification process ==
The beatification process opened in Naples in an informative phase of an investigation that Alessio Ascalesi inaugurated on 10 May 1927 in the metropolitan cathedral and closed at a solemn Mass on 12 July 1936. Another process was conducted in Rome from 19 January to 3 March 1943. Theologians collected and evaluated all of Sforza's writings to determine if such writings adhered to Church doctrine; the theologians confirmed this and approved them in a decree issued on 3 February 1946. The formal introduction to the cause came under Pope Pius XII on 3 August 1947 and Sforza was titled as a Servant of God. Ascalesi oversaw the beginning of an apostolic process on 14 July 1950 which was concluded under Ascalesi's successor Marcello Mimmi on 28 November 1952. Michele Giordano oversaw the final investigation from 27 June 1995 until sometime later.

The documentation collected from these processes was sent in boxes to the Congregation for the Causes of Saints who validated the previous processes on 23 May 1997; the C.C.S. later received the Positio dossier for evaluation in 2003. Historical consultants approved the cause on 30 March 2004. Theologians confirmed the cause on 18 February 2011 as did the cardinal and bishop members of the C.C.S. on 8 May 2012. Pope Benedict XVI named Sforza as Venerable on 28 June 2012 after confirming that Sforza had lived a model Christian life of heroic virtue.

The current postulator for this cause is the Franciscan friar Giovangiuseppe Califano.

== See also ==
- Our Lady of La Salette
- Roman Catholic Archdiocese of Naples

Catholic Church titles
Preceded by Francesco Saverio Durini, O.S.B. Cel.	Bishop of Aversa; 24 April 1845 – 24 November 1845	Succeeded by Antonio Saverio De Luca
Preceded by Filippo Giudice Caracciolo	Archbishop of Naples; 24 November 1845 – 29 September 1877	Succeeded by Guglielmo Sanfelice d'Acquavilla, O.S.B. Cas.
Preceded by Domenico Carafa di Traetto	Camerlengo of the Sacred College of Cardinals; 27 March 1865 – 8 January 1866	Succeeded by Camillo di Pietro
