= Basilica Therma (Bithynia) =

Town of ancient Bithynia

Coordinates: 40°12′21″N 29°02′34″E

Basilica Therma was a town located of ancient Bithynia, near Prusa.

Its site is located near Çekirge, Asiatic Turkey.
