= Elekosmioi =

Populated places in Bithynia

Coordinates: 40°21′13″N 29°02′17″E

Elekosmioi was a town located near the coast of the Propontis in ancient Bithynia, between Cius and Apamea Myrlea.

Its site is located near Elegmi, Asiatic Turkey.
