= Giuseppe Capece Zurlo =

Italian cardinal

His Eminence Giuseppe Capece Zurlo CR SMOCG
- Archbishop of Naples
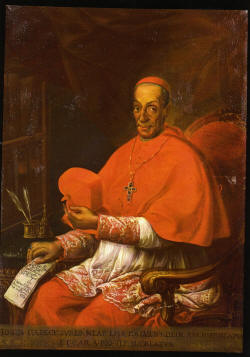
- Church: Roman Catholic Church
- Archdiocese: Archdiocese of Naples
- See: Naples
- Appointed: 16 December 1782
- Term ended: 31 December 1801
- Predecessor: Giuseppe Spinelli
- Successor: Luigi Ruffo-Scilla
- Other post: Cardinal-Priest of San Bernardo alle Terme (1783–1801)
- Previous post: Bishop of Calvi (1756–1782)

Orders
- Ordination: 19 December 1733
- Consecration: 27 May 1756
- Created cardinal: 16 December 1782 by Pope Pius VI
- Rank: Cardinal-Priest

Personal details
- Born: Giuseppe Capece Zurlo; 3 January 1711 Monteroni di Lecce, Italy
- Died: 31 December 1801 (aged 90) Naples, Italy

Giuseppe Maria Capece Zurlo, Theat. (3 January 1711, Monteroni di Lecce, Apulia – 31 December 1801) was an Italian cardinal who served as Archbishop of Naples.

Capece Zurlo was born in Monteroni di Lecce, Apulia, into the noble family of the princes of Zurlo. He was the son of Prince Giacomo Capece Zurlo and Ippolita Sambiase, of the princes of Campana di Portanova.

== Education ==
He entered the Theatines, or Congregation of the Clerks Regular of the Divine Providence, and made his profession on 6 January 1727. He received the diaconate on 28 February 1733. He studied philosophy and theology in Theatine houses of study in Rome.

== Priesthood ==
He was ordained on 19 December 1733. In his order he served as lector of philosophy, at the House of the Santi Apostoli, for nine years; and as lector of theology, minister, consultor, vice-provost and lector of philosophy, in the House of San Silvestro, Rome. When he was about to be elected procurator general in 1756, the pope appointed him Bishop of Calvi, on 24 May 1756; he was consecrated three days later.

== Cardinalate ==
He was created cardinal and promoted to the metropolitan see of Naples on 16 December 1782, and was installed as Cardinal Priest of San Bernardo alle Terme on 17 February 1783. He was decorated by King Ferdinand IV of Sicily with the grand cross of the Sacred Military Constantinian Order of Saint George in 1783 and was named Knight of the Order of Saint Januarius in 1790.

In 1799 he tried to avoid the popular uprising encouraged by the Sanfedismo revolt organized by Cardinal Fabrizio Ruffo against the French Revolutionary army of General Championnet. He did not participate in the Papal conclave, 1799-1800, which elected Pope Pius VII.

Styles of Giuseppe Capece Zurlo
- Reference style: His Eminence
- Spoken style: Your Eminence
- Informal style: Cardinal
- See: none

=== Death ===
He died on 31 December 1801 at the monastery of Montevergine, Naples.

== Honors ==
Constantinian Order of Saint George (1783)

Constantinian Order of Saint George (1783)

Order of San Gennaro (1790)

== See also ==
- Apulia
- Archdiocese of Naples
- Cardinal (Catholic Church)
- Deacon
- Diocese of Teano-Calvi
- Holy orders
- List of bishops and archbishops of Naples
- Monteroni di Lecce
- Montevergine
- Order of Saint Januarius
- Sacred Military Constantinian Order of Saint George
- Theatines

Catholic Church titles
Preceded by Serafino Filangeri	Archbishop of Naples; 16 December 1782 – 31 December 1801	Succeeded by Luigi Ruffo-Scilla
