= Arcisate Treasure =

Roman silver hoard

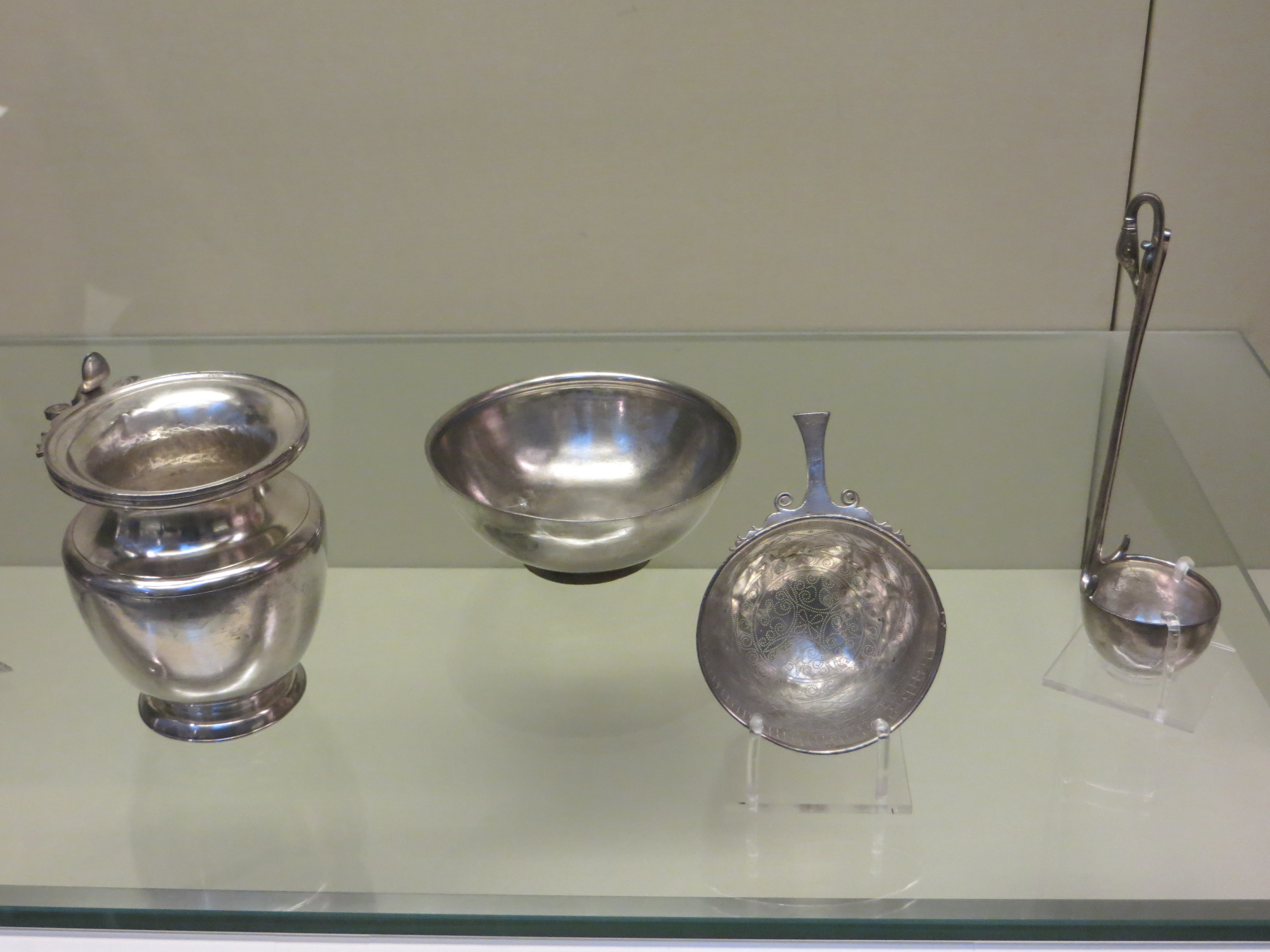
- Four of the five items from the Arcisate Treasure, as displayed in the British Museum
- Material: Silver
- Size: Height of jug - 13 cm
- Created: 100-75 BC
- Present location: British Museum, London
- Registration: GR 1900.7-30.3-7 (Silver 126-130)

The Arcisate Treasure is a Roman silver hoard found in the town of Arcisate, northern Italy. Soon after its discovery in 1900, the treasure was acquired by the British Museum According to scholars, the treasure's significance is due to the completeness of the set, the high quality of the craftsmanship and materials used to make it, as well as the hoard's excellent state of preservation.

== Discovery ==
The treasure was found in Arcisate in the province of Varese in 1900 and was almost immediately bought by Adolf Roger, who in turn sold it to the British Museum.

== Description ==
The Arcisate Treasure is composed of five objects, all made of silver. They include a jug, a cup (both handles of which are now missing), a strainer, a ladle and a spatula. The whole set would have been used for the mixing and serving of wine, either for dining or for religious ceremonies. Various inscriptions indicate the treasure's previous owners - on the jug's base is inscribed "Utia T(iti) f(ilia) p(ondo)", which can be translated as 'Utia daughter of Titus'. The ladle is engraved with the following letters in Latin: "T. Uti V(ibi) f(ili) p(ondo) III sc(ripula) IV", which can be interpreted as 'This ladle is the property of Titus Utius, son of Vibius, weighs three Roman pounds and four ounces'. Titus Utius was probably a Roman citizen, and father of Utia, who is referred to on the jug.

== See also ==
- Berthouville Treasure
- Hildesheim Treasure
- Bursa Treasure

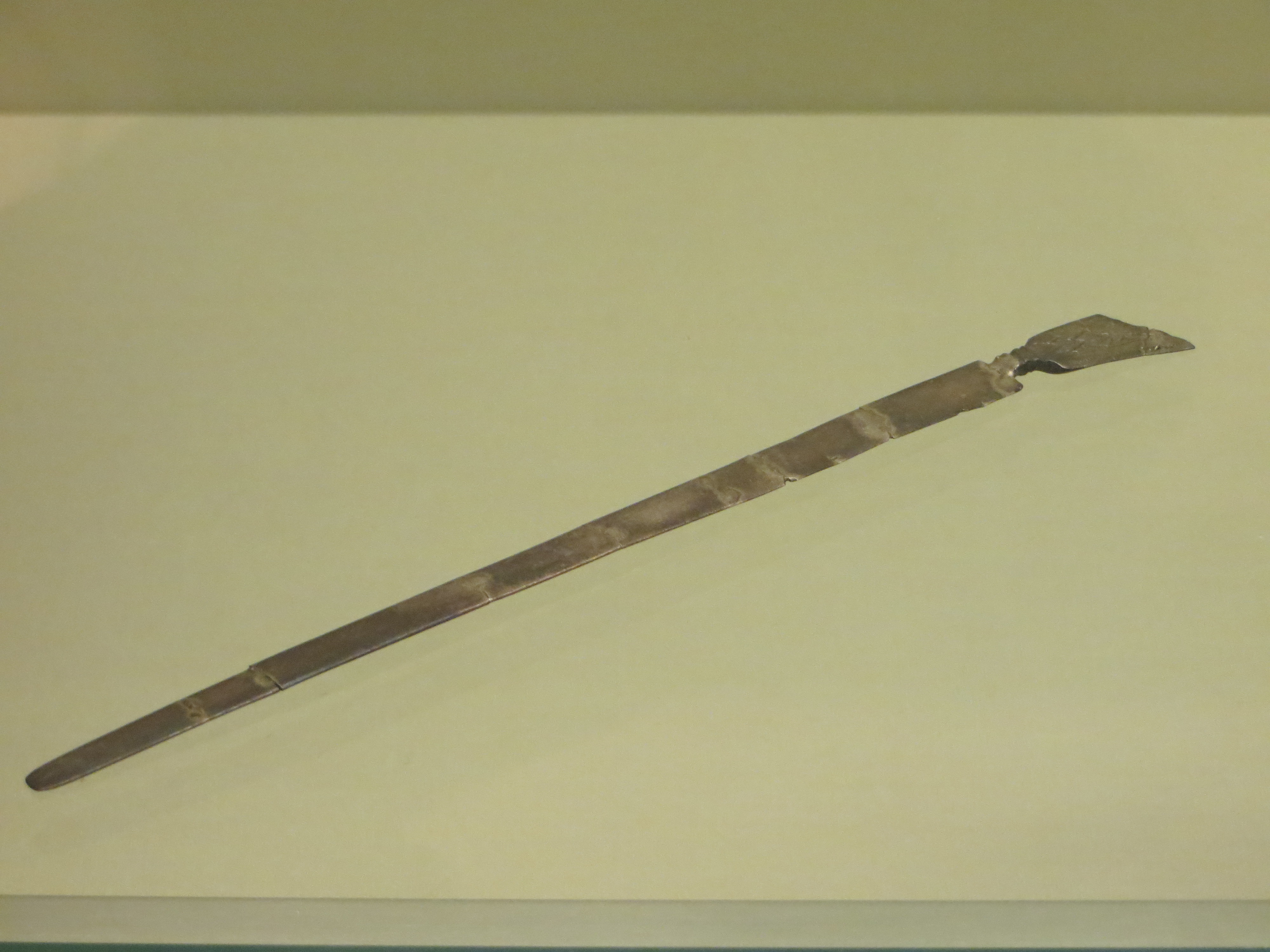
Silver spatular from the treasure.

== Sources ==
- D. Strong, Greek and Roman Silver Plate (British Museum Press, 1966)
- L. Burn, The British Museum Book of Greek and Roman Art (British Museum Press, 1991)
- S. Walker, Roman Art (British Museum Press, 1991)
