= Germanicopolis (Bithynia) =

Ancient Roman town in Turkey

- Γερμανικόπολις (Ancient Greek)
- Location within Turkey
- 40°10′N 28°53′E
- Location: Turkey
- Region: Bursa Province

Germanicopolis (Greek: Γερμανικόπολις) was an ancient town in Bithynia, also known as Caesarea in Bythinia (not to be confused with Caesarea Germanica, as such a former bishopric and present Latin Catholic titular see.

== History ==
It was located on the Gelbes river, not far from Prusa. In earlier times it was called Helge, Helgas or Booscoete (Βοὸς κοίτη), Plin. v. 40. Modern scholars locate the town at the village of Tahtalı.

In early 1205, a battle was fought there between the invading Crusaders and the Byzantines, in which many Latins were killed.

The city was taken by the Ottoman Empire in 1326 and the new Ottoman capital city was built at nearby Bursa (the Ancient Prusa).

== Ecclesiastical history ==
In Byzantine times the town was the see of a suffragan of the Archdiocese of Nicomedia, in the sway of the Patriarchate of Constantinople.

The names of a number of bishops are historically documented:

- Phileas, mentioned in the martyr vita of Saint Tirsus and companions under Roman emperor Diocletian.
- Rufus, attending the First Council of Nicaea
- Paul(us), partook in the minor Council of Constantinople of 518
- Johannes, attended the Council of Constantinople convoked by Patriarch Mennas of Constantinople in 536
- Theodosius quarrelled with Maximus the Confessor
- Theodorus, partook in the Third Council of Constantinople
- Constantinus, attending the Second Council of Nicaea
- Theophilus, partook in the Council of Constantinople of 879-880 which rehabilitated Photius as Patriarch of Constantinople

== Titular see ==
The diocese was nominally restored in 1933 as Latin Titular bishopric of Cesarea in Bithynia (Latin) / Cesarea di Bitinia (Curiate Italian) / Cæsarien(sis) in Bithynia (Latin adjective).

It is vacant since decades, having had the following incumbents, so far of the fitting Episcopal (lowest) rank :

- Anthony Jeremiah Pesce, Passionist (C.P.) (born Italy) (1951.05.10 – 1953.03.25) as last Apostolic Vicar of Dodoma (Tanzania) (1951.05.10 – 1953.03.25); next (see) promoted first Bishop of Dodoma (Tanzania) (1953.03.25 – death 1971.12.20)
- Giovanni Sismondo (1954.09.30 – 1955.02.21) (Italian), on emeritate : previously Bishop of Pontremoli (Italy) (1930.02.06 – 1954.09.30); later (promoted) Titular Archbishop of Marcianopolis (1955.02.21 – death 1957.12.07)
- Secondo Chiocca (1955.04.15 – death 1982.01.05) first as Auxiliary Bishop of Archdiocese of Genova (Genua, Italy) (1955.04.15 – retired 1981.05.09), then as emeritate; previously Bishop of Roman Catholic Diocese of Foligno (Italy) (1947.01.18 – resigned 1955.04.15).

== Sources and external links ==
- GCatholic - (former and) titular bishopric
- Talbert, Richard, ed. (2000). "Map 52". Barrington Atlas of the Greek and Roman World. Princeton University Press. ISBN 978-0-691-03169-9, with accompanying Map-by-Map Directory.
- Pius Bonifacius Gams, Series episcoporum Ecclesiae Catholicae, Leipzig 1931, p. 443
- Le Quien, Michel (1740). "Ecclesia Cæsareæ". Oriens Christianus, in quatuor Patriarchatus digestus: quo exhibentur ecclesiæ, patriarchæ, cæterique præsules totius Orientis. Tomus primus: tres magnas complectens diœceses Ponti, Asiæ & Thraciæ, Patriarchatui Constantinopolitano subjectas (in Latin). Paris: Ex Typographia Regia. cols. 627–628. OCLC 955922585.
- Raymond Janin, lemma 'Césarée de Bithynie', in Dictionnaire d'Histoire et de Géographie ecclésiastiques, vol. XII, Paris 1953, col. 199
- O City of Byzantium: Annals of Niketas Choniates. Translated by Magoulias, Harry J. Wayne State University Press. 1984. ISBN 0-8143-1764-2.
