= Bursa Treasure =

Roman silver hoard

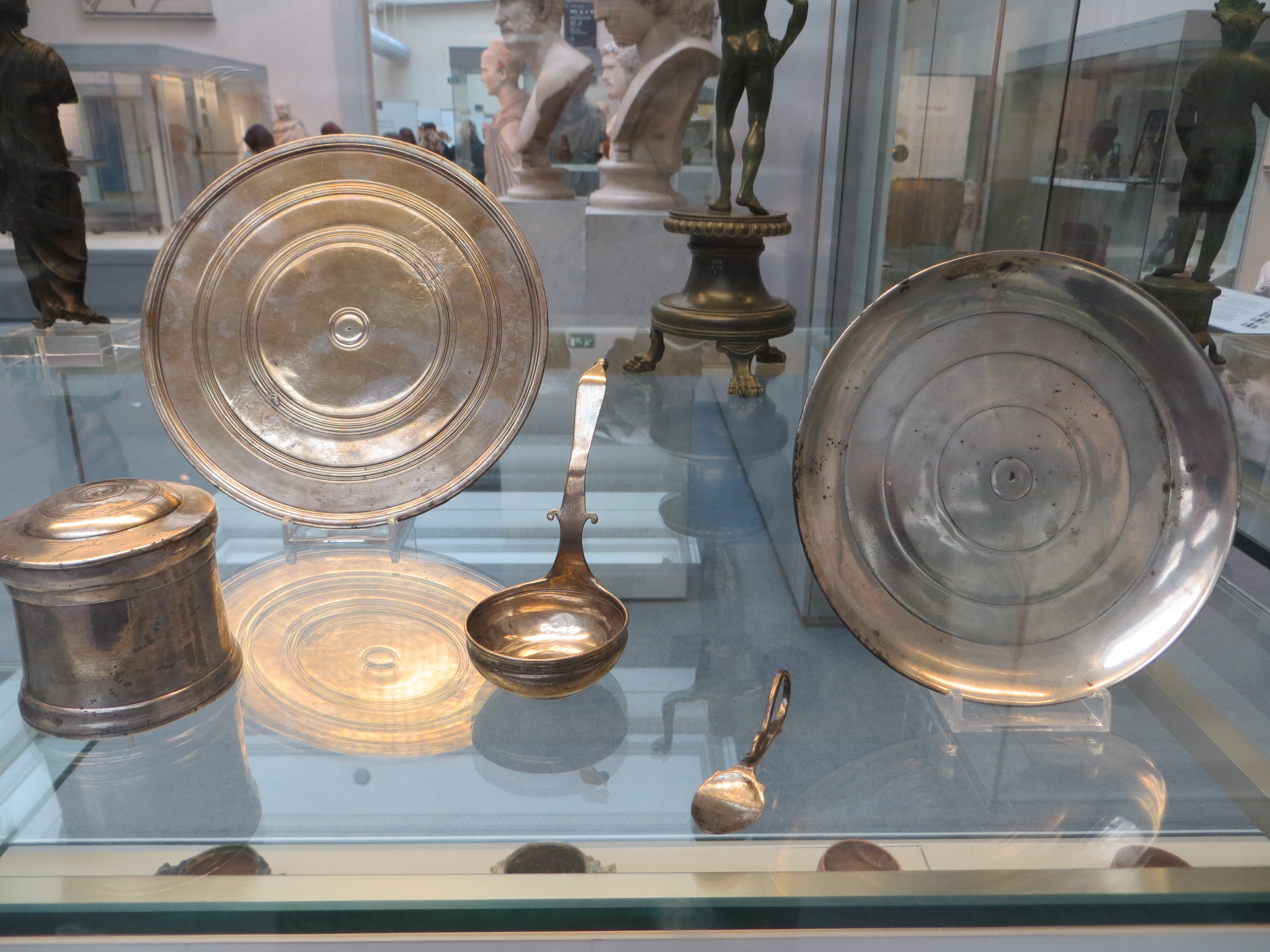
- Bursa Treasure as displayed in the British Museum
- Material: Silver
- Created: 1st century AD
- Present location: British Museum, London
- Registration: 1913,0531.1-7

The Bursa Treasure or the Brusa Treasure is the name of an early Ancient Roman silver hoard from the ancient city of Prousa, found in Bursa, Western Turkey. Since 1913, the entire treasure has been part of the British Museum's collection.

== Discovery and original ownership ==
In the early 20th century, a rich collection of silver articles was unearthed from a tomb near Bursa in the Marmara region of Turkey. The exact circumstances of the treasure's discovery remains unclear, but it was later sold to the British Museum by the London art dealer W. C. Bacon & Co in 1913.

The lack of provenance has made it difficult to determine who the hoard originally belonged to, but most of the extant objects indicate that it was probably part of an elite Roman lady's toiletry from the 1st century AD.

== Description ==
The Bursa Treasure that is currently reserved in the British Museum is composed of seven artefacts, which includes a cylindrical pyxis, a little straight-sided bowl, a little spoon with a looped handle ending in a swan's head, a mirror, and a simpulum. High quality, luxury artefacts made from precious metal are relatively rare from the early decades of the Roman Empire, although there are similar finds emanating from Pompeii and Boscoreale in southern Italy.

== Gallery ==
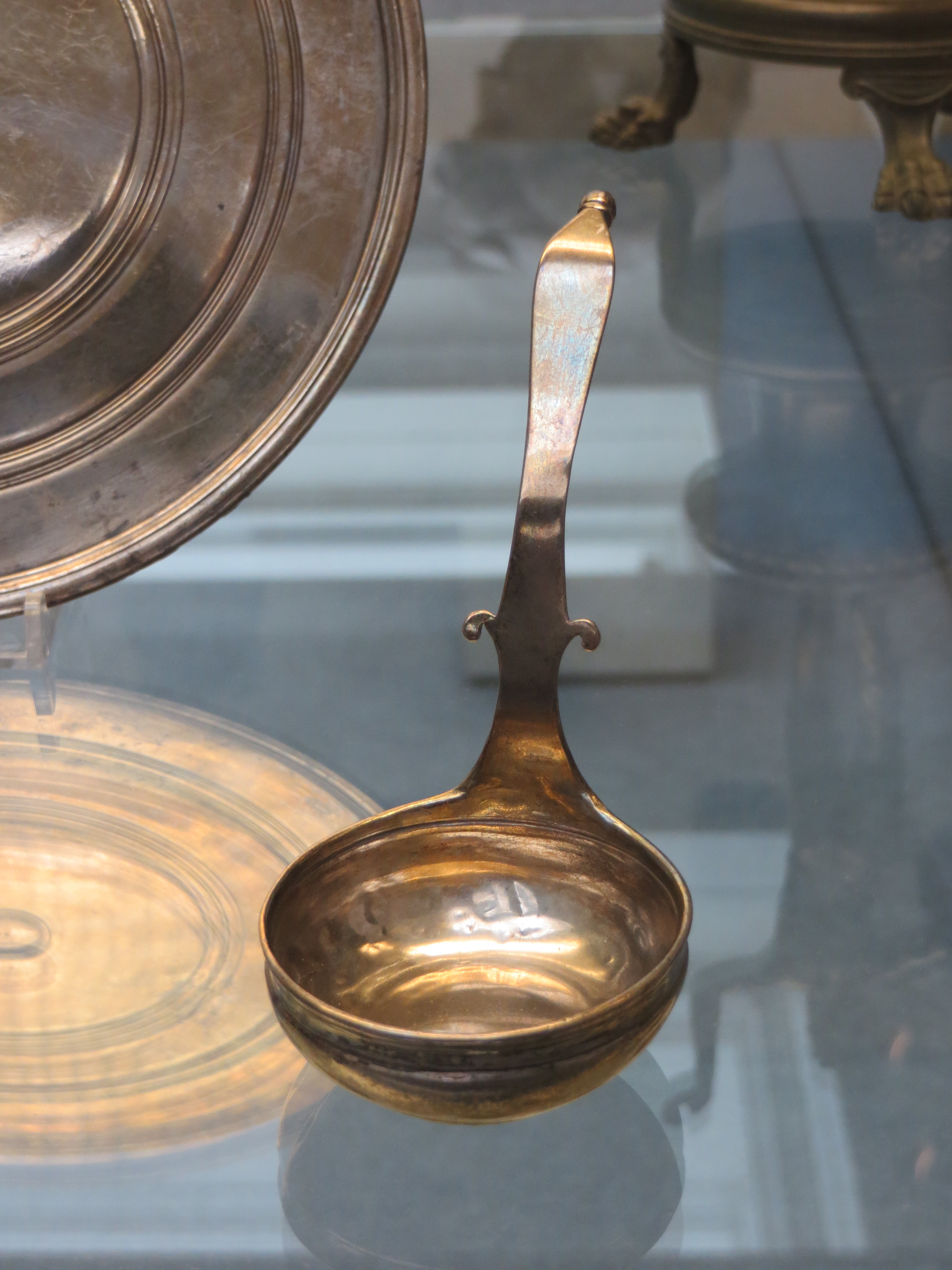
Simpulum from the treasure

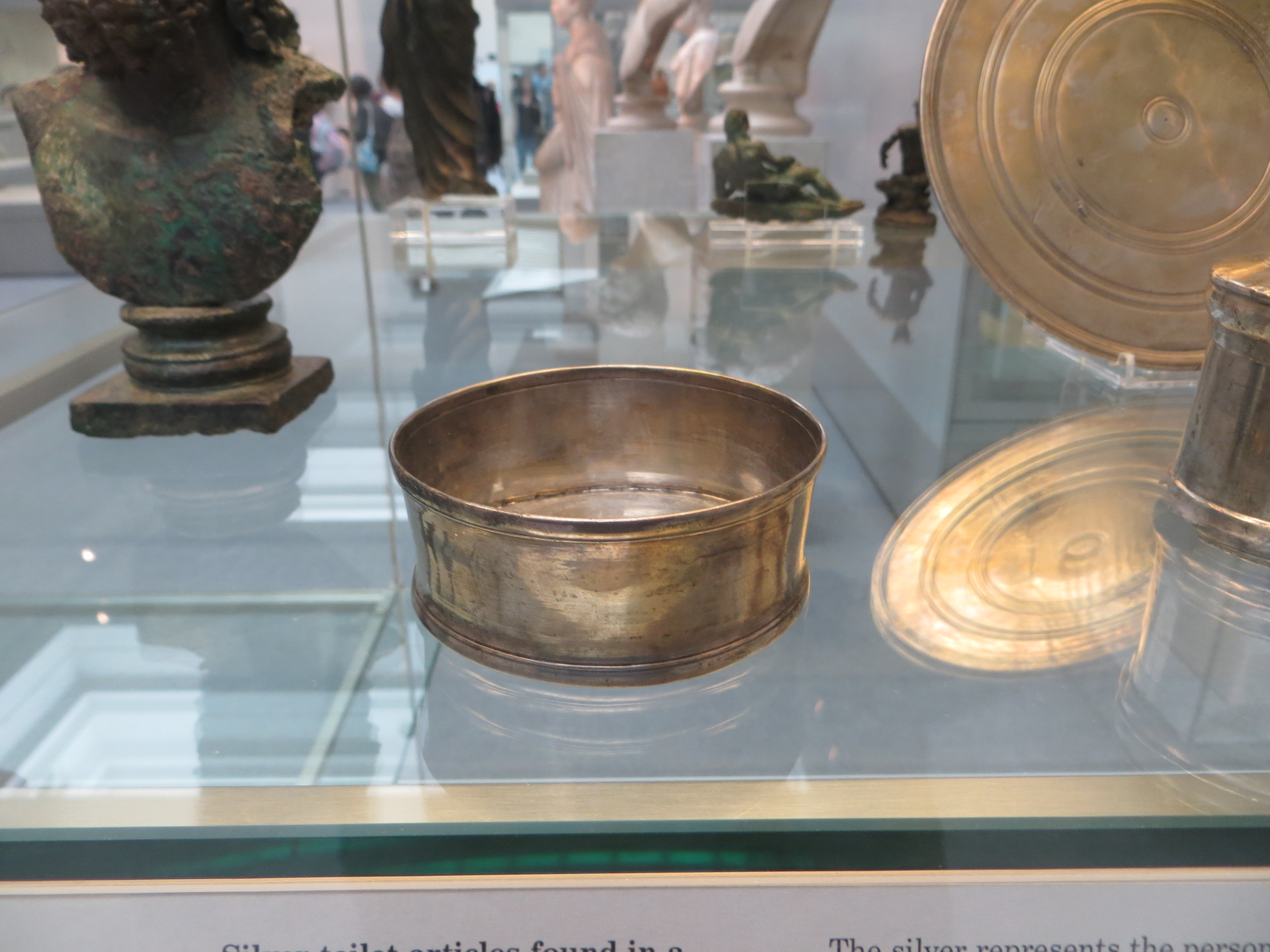
Small vessel for containing cosmetics

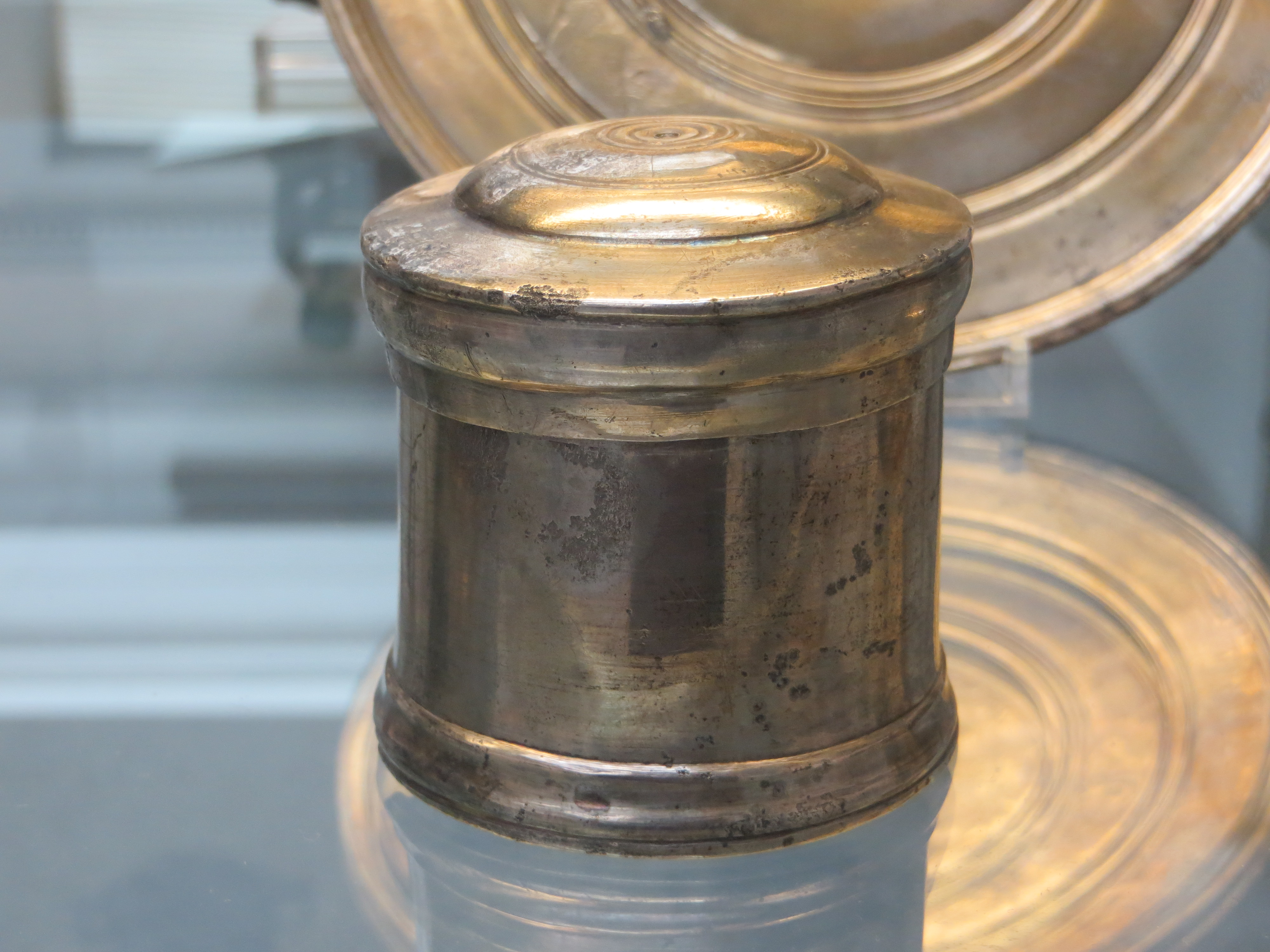
Silver pyxis with lid

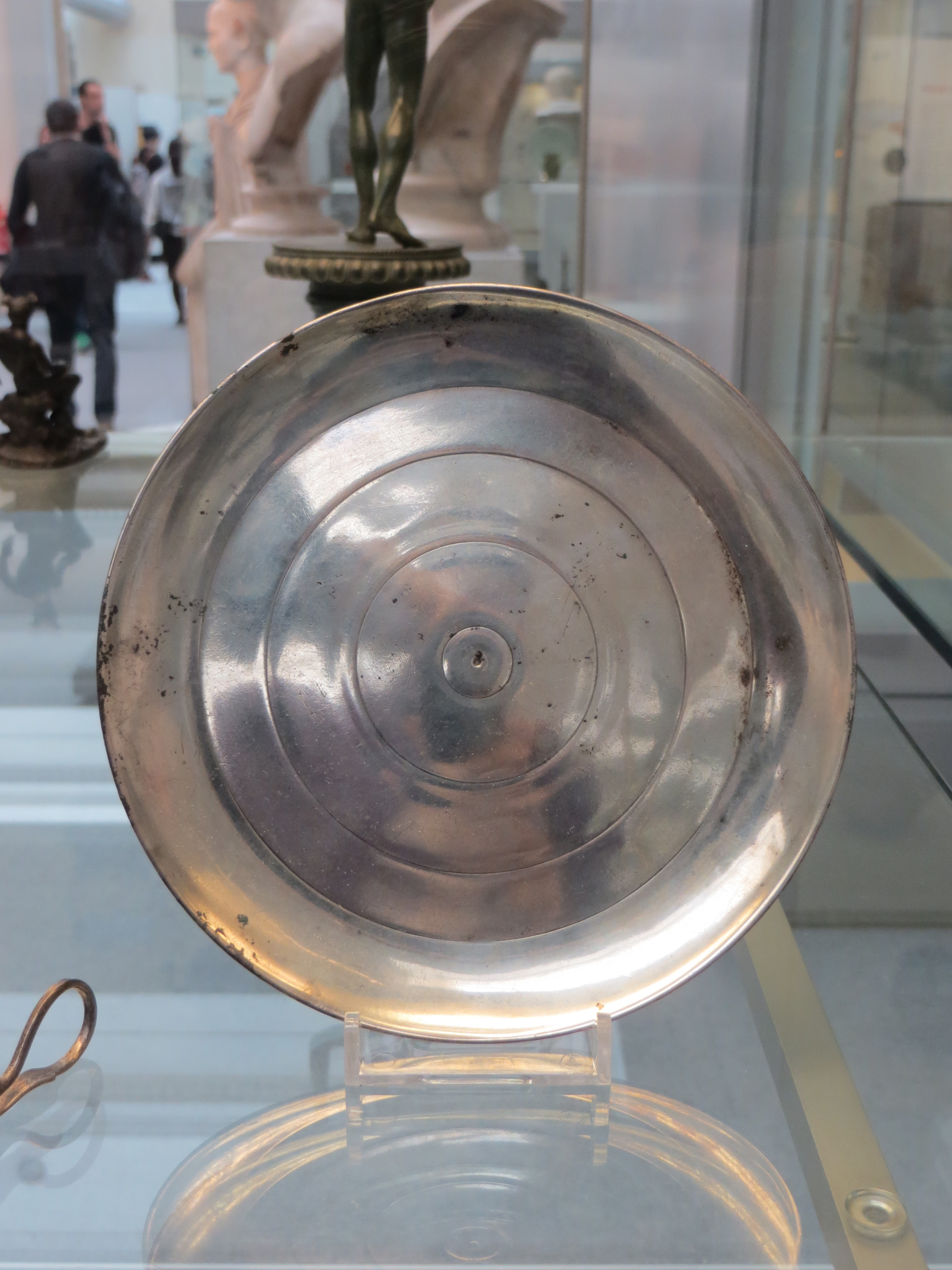
Libation bowl or patera

== See also ==
- Arcisate Treasure

== Bibliography ==
- D. Strong, Greek and Roman Silver Plate (British Museum Press, 1966)
- L. Burn, The British Museum Book of Greek and Roman Art (British Museum Press, 1991)
- S. Walker, Roman Art (British Museum Press, 1991)
- H Mangoldt, Der Silberschatz von Brusa/Bursa im British Museum, (British Archaeological Reports, 2005)
