= Monteroni di Lecce =

- Comune
- Città di Monteroni di Lecce
- Coat of arms

- Location within Italy Location within Apulia
- Coordinates: 40°20′N 18°06′E
- Country: Italy
- Region: Apulia
- Province: Lecce

Government
  - Mayor: Mariolina Pizzuto

Area
  - Total: 16.5 km^{2} (6.4 sq mi)
- Elevation: 35 m (115 ft)

Population (2008)
  - Total: 13,828
  - Density: 838/km^{2} (2,170/sq mi)
- Demonym: Monteronesi
- Time zone: UTC+1 (CET)
  - Summer (DST): UTC+2 (CEST)
- Postal code: 73047
- Dialing code: 0832
- ISTAT code: 075048
- Patron saint: St. Anthony of Padua
- Saint day: First Sunday in August
- Website: comune.monteroni.le.it

Monteroni di Lecce (Salentino: Muntrùni) is a town and comune in the province of Lecce, in Apulia, southern Italy. In 2008, it had 13,800 inhabitants. It is 7 kilometres (4 mi) from Lecce, in the Salento – the historic Terra d'Otranto.

== History ==
Probably the name Monteroni comes from the Latin Mons Tyronum, meaning "mount of the spear-men" and hinting at its origin as a training camp for the Roman legions. In fact, originally the Romans apparently established a military stronghold on the hill nowadays called San Filii. From this era of romanisation of the region, coins and other archaeological material has been found and studied.

During the Norman period, the fiefdom of Monteroni was part of the County of Lecce. In 1250 Holy Roman Emperor Frederick II (and also sovereign of the Kingdom of Sicily) granted the fiefdom to the De Cremona family, followed in this feudal office by the Montoroni family who held it until the 16th century. The Montoroni built the first Baronial Palace in the town in the original shape of a small fortress.

When the fief passed onto the Duke of Spongano, the Baronial Palace was enlarged and gained the current Leccese Baroque style. Monteroni di Lecce owes the baroque period also its bell tower and the two chapels, which were in the central square (currently “Piazza I. Falconieri”) on the site currently occupied by the major church “Chiesa Matrice”.

Feudalism in the south of Italy was abolished with the events following the French Revolution when also the Kingdom of Naples became a republic and then a Napoleonic kingdom. Since then it was the “Municipality of Monteroni di Lecce” which took over and carried on the sorts of the fief of Monteroni.

== Main sights ==
Sights in the town include the Chiesa Matrice,, the Palazzo Baronale, the Villa Romano, the Villa Carelli-Palombi, the Villa Urselli and the Villa Saetta.

== Twin towns ==
- Lengnau, Switzerland
