= Filippo Giudice Caracciolo =

Italian prelate

His Eminence Filippo Giudice Caracciolo C.O.
- Archbishop of Naples
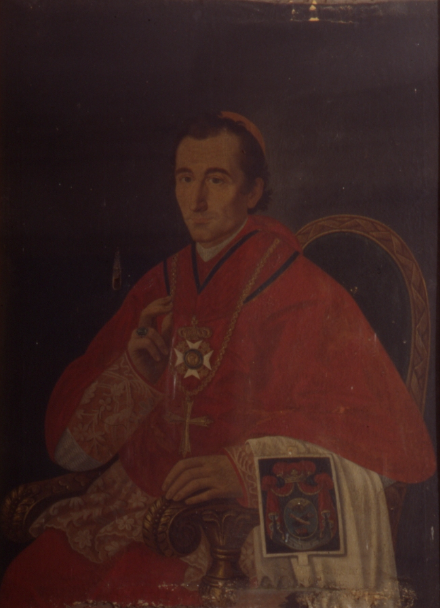
- Church: Roman Catholic Church
- Archdiocese: Naples
- See: Naples
- Appointed: 15 April 1833
- Term ended: 29 January 1844
- Predecessor: Luigi Ruffo-Scilla
- Successor: Sisto Riario Sforza
- Other post: Cardinal-Priest of Sant'Agnese fuori le mura (1833–44)
- Previous post: Bishop of Molfetta (1820–33)

Orders
- Ordination: 18 March 1809 by Bernardo Maria della Torre
- Consecration: 27 February 1820 by Lorenzo Litta
- Created cardinal: 29 July 1833 by Pope Gregory XVI
- Rank: Cardinal-Priest

Personal details
- Born: Filippo Giudice Caracciolo; 27 March 1785 Naples, Kingdom of Naples
- Died: 29 January 1844 (aged 58) Naples, Kingdom of the Two Sicilies
- Buried: Naples Cathedral
- Parents: Francesco Giudice Caracciolo; Maria Vittoria Palma Artois
- Education: University of Naples

Styles of Filippo Giudice Caracciolo
- Reference style: His Eminence
- Spoken style: Your Eminence
- Religious style: Monsignor
- Informal style: Cardinal
- See: Naples

Filippo Giudice Caracciolo was an Italian prelate who was archbishop of Naples from 1833 to 1844.

== Life ==
Born into a noble family in Naples on 27 March 1785, he entered the Oratorian order in the late years of the 18th century. He was ordained on March 18, 1809. He performed his pastoral duties in different places and in 1820 he was named bishop of Molfetta and consecrated as bishop. In 1833, he was named by pope Gregory XVI archbishop of Naples. In the same year he was named Cardinal with the title of S. Agnese fuori le mura. He died on 29 January 1844.

Catholic Church titles
Preceded by Luigi Ruffo-Scilla	Archbishop of Naples; 1833–1844	Succeeded by Sisto Riario Sforza
