= Arcisate =

- Comune
- Comune di Arcisate
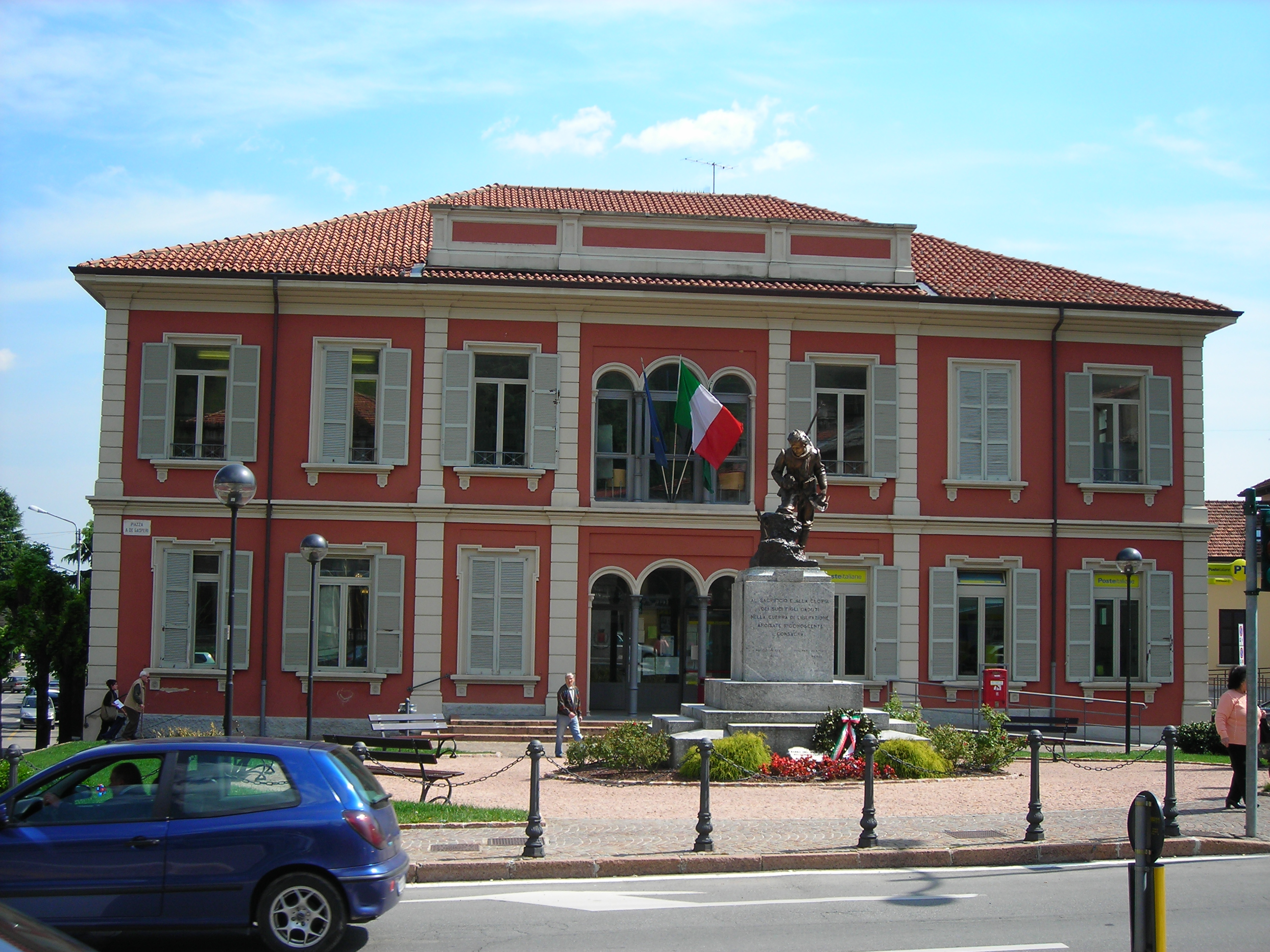
- Piazza Alcide De Gasperi

- Coat of arms

- Location within Italy Location within Lombardy
- Coordinates: 45°52′N 08°52′E
- Country: Italy
- Region: Lombardy
- Province: Varese (VA)
- Frazioni: Brenno Useria, Velmaio

Government
  - Mayor: Antonino Centorrino

Area
  - Total: 12 km^{2} (4.6 sq mi)
- Elevation: 372 m (1,220 ft)

Population (28 February 2017)
  - Total: 9,955
  - Density: 830/km^{2} (2,100/sq mi)
- Demonym: Arcisatesi
- Time zone: UTC+1 (CET)
  - Summer (DST): UTC+2 (CEST)
- Postal code: 21051
- Dialing code: 0332
- Patron saint: St. Victor
- Saint day: 8 May
- Website: Official website

Arcisate is a comune (municipality) in the province of Varese, in the Italian region of Lombardy. The celebrated Arcisate Treasure of Roman silverware was found in the town in the nineteenth century. It is now in the British Museum.

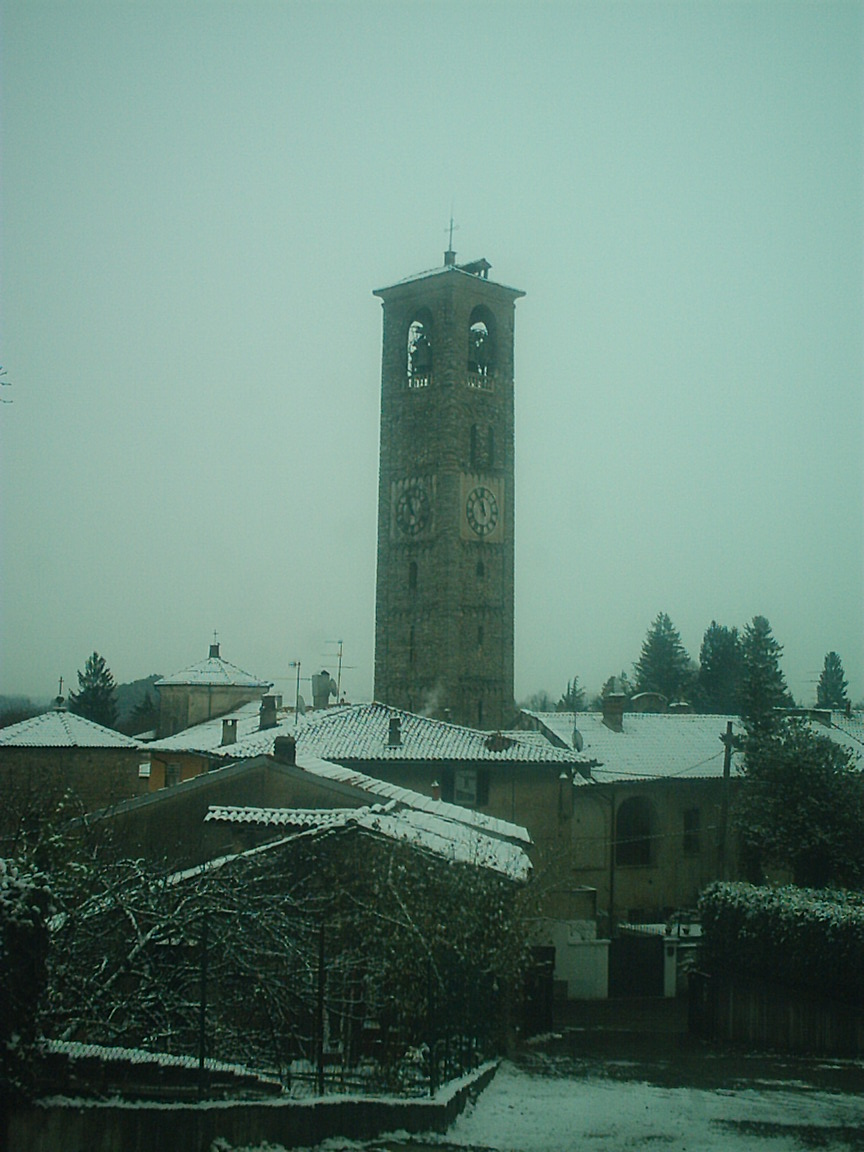
The Campanile in Arcisate

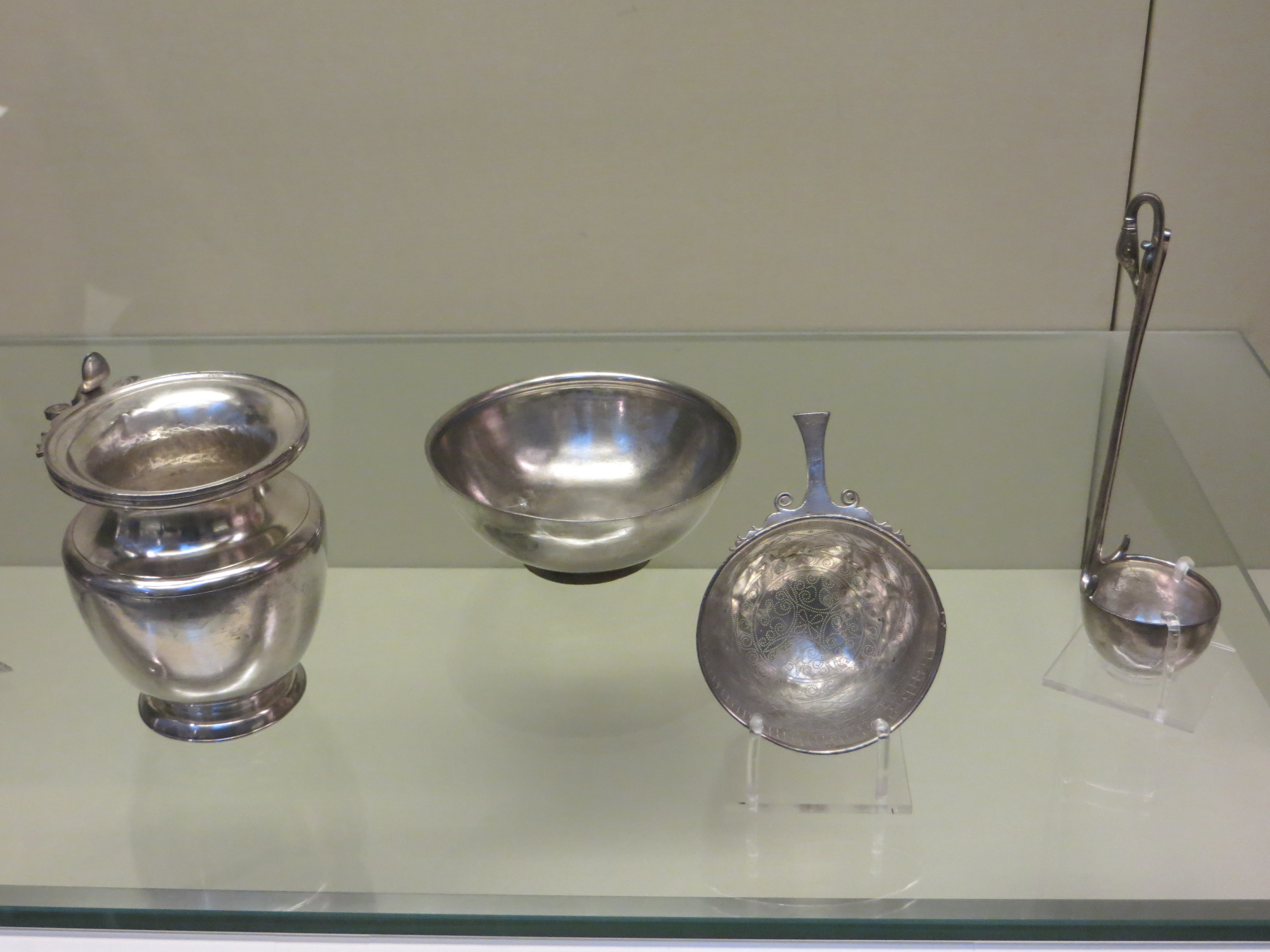
The Arcisate Treasure in the British Museum

== Transport ==
Since 1894, the Varese–Porto Ceresio railway line has run through the municipal area; it was originally operated by Rete Mediterranea, before passing to the management of Ferrovie dello Stato and subsequently to RFI. From that year onwards, there has therefore been a station serving the town, which was demolished in 2010 and subsequently rebuilt and reopened in 2017, having been affected by the construction works for the Mendrisio–Varese railway line (which uses the route of the line to Porto Ceresio on the section between Varese and Arcisate), as a result of which the entire Valceresio railway line was suspended from 2009 to 2018. Once reopened to traffic, the Arcisate station became a junction between the two sections.
