= Hildesheim Treasure =

Large collection of Roman silver found in Hildesheim, Germany

Coordinates: 52°08′32″N 9°58′20″E

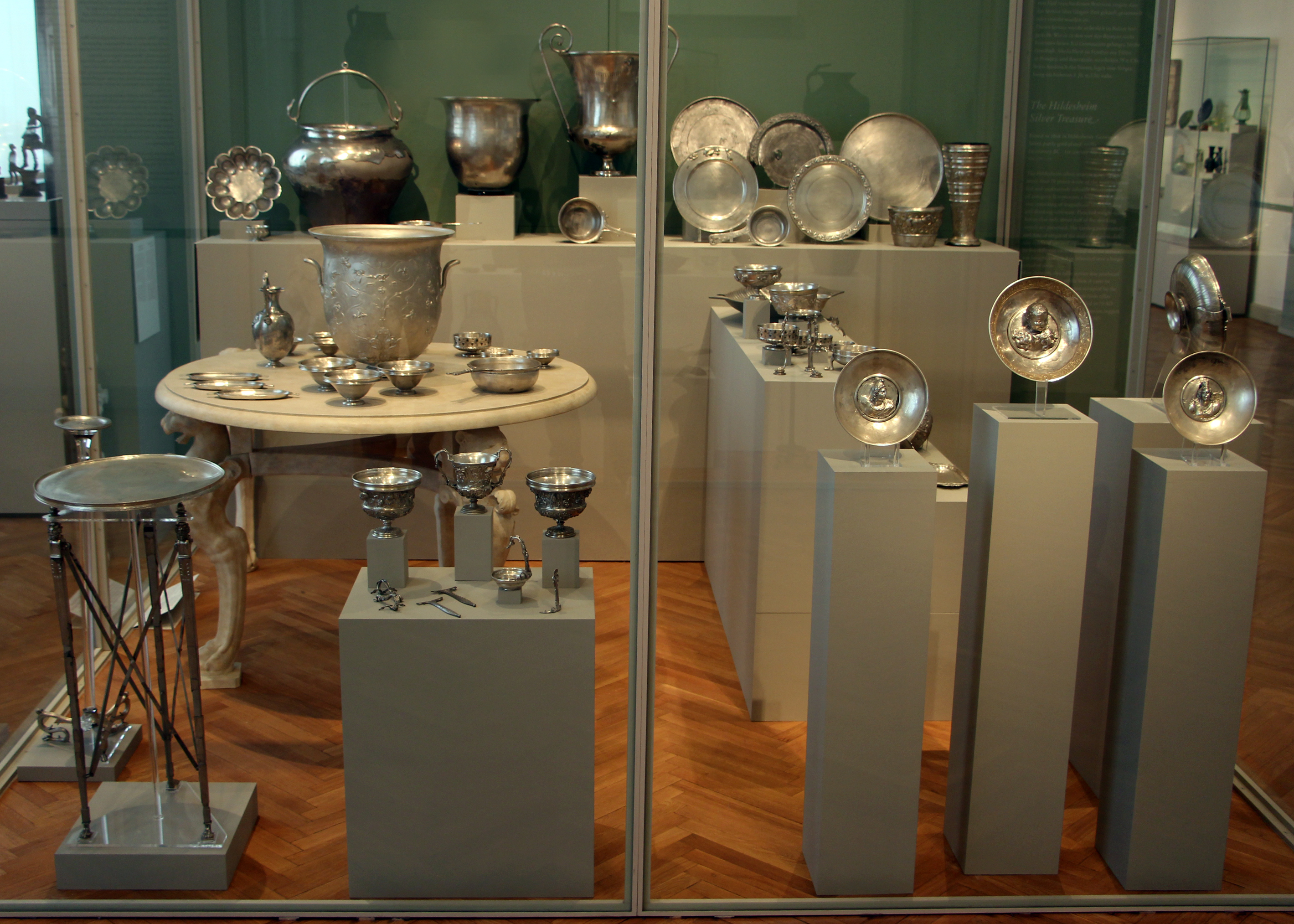
Hildesheim Treasure

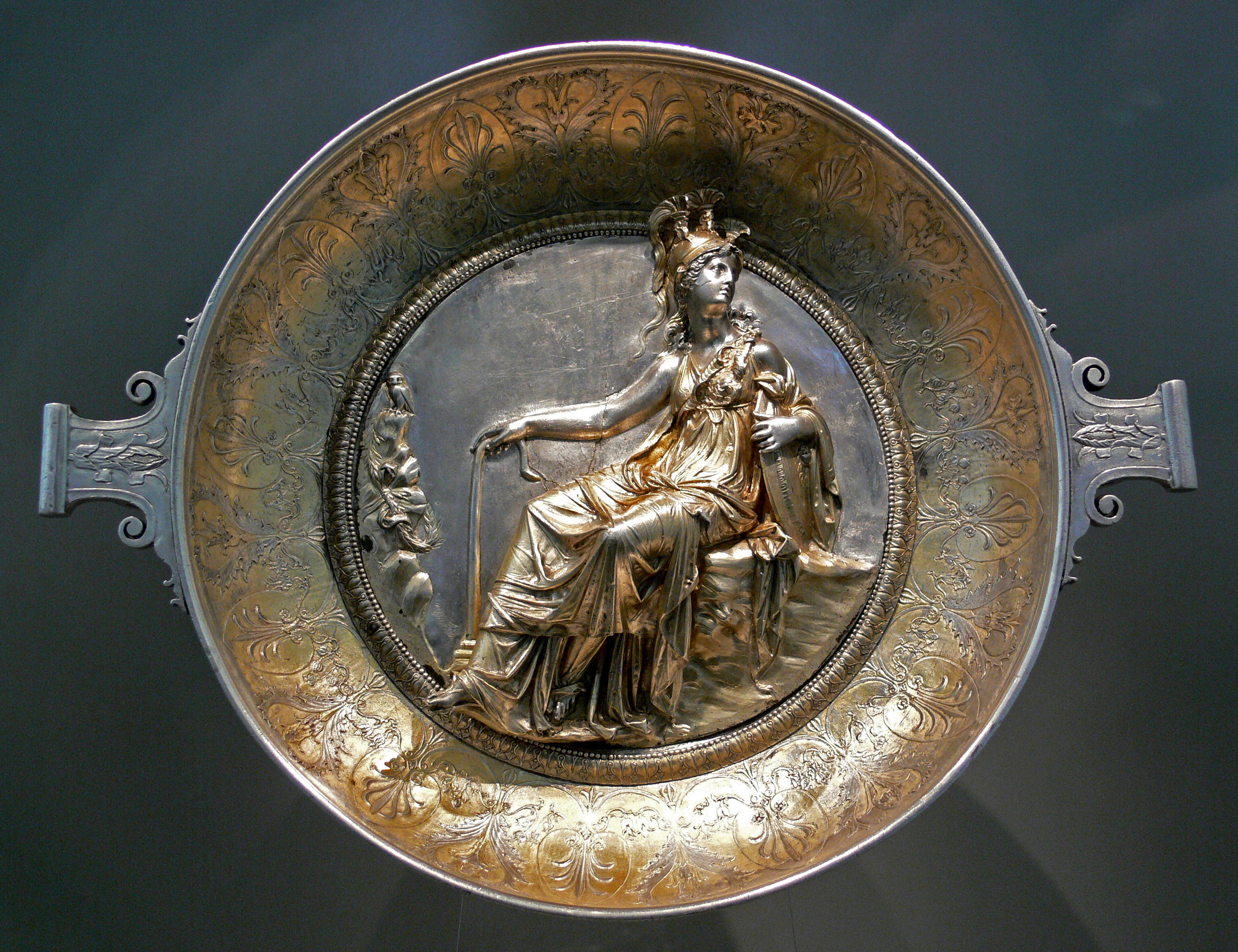
The Minerva Bowl

The Hildesheim Treasure, unearthed on October 17, 1868 in Hildesheim, Germany, is the largest collection of Roman silver found outside imperial frontiers. Most of it can be dated to the 1st century AD. The trove consists of about seventy exquisitely crafted solid silver vessels for eating and drinking and is now kept in the Antikensammlung Berlin (Altes Museum). It is generally believed that the treasure was the table service of a Roman commander, perhaps Publius Quinctilius Varus, who was militarily active in Germania. However, others also suggest that the treasure may have been war spoils rather than table service.

The hoard was buried about 2 metres (6 ft 7 in) below the ground on Galgenberg Hill and was found by Prussian soldiers when preparing part of the area for a shooting range. Most scholars now accept that the entire Hildesheim Treasure was produced in frontier workshops of the northwestern Roman provinces.

== Notable items ==
The trove contains plates, tureens, cups, goblets, trays, scoops, egg-holders, saltcellars, a small folding three-legged table, a candelabrum and a three-legged pedestal. One of the finest items is the so-called Minerva Bowl (or Athena Bowl). It features a detailed image of Minerva, who sits on a rock throne and holds a cane in her right hand and a shield in her left hand. The goddess is wearing her battle headgear and flowing robe, further from Minerva's right hand is her symbol, the owl. The bowl has two handles, each measuring 3.4 centimetres (1.3 in) in length. The bowl itself weighs 2.388 kilograms (5.26 lb), having a 25-centimetre (9.8 in) diameter and 7.1 centimetres (2.8 in) in depth. The krater was lost in 1945, and is now shown in plaster copy.

Other notable items are paterae with the high relief of infant Hercules strangling the serpents and with the low relief heads of Attis and Cybele. There are also three calyx bowls with heavy rims, a tripod bowl with a leaf ornament performed in niello, a krater and a kantharos, as well as two-handled cups ornamented in repoussé and items dedicated to Bacchus. Copies of the trove items have been made for museums like the Victoria and Albert Museum, the Germanisches Nationalmuseum and the Pushkin Museum.
