= Chiesa Matrice, Erice =

Church in Sicily, Italy

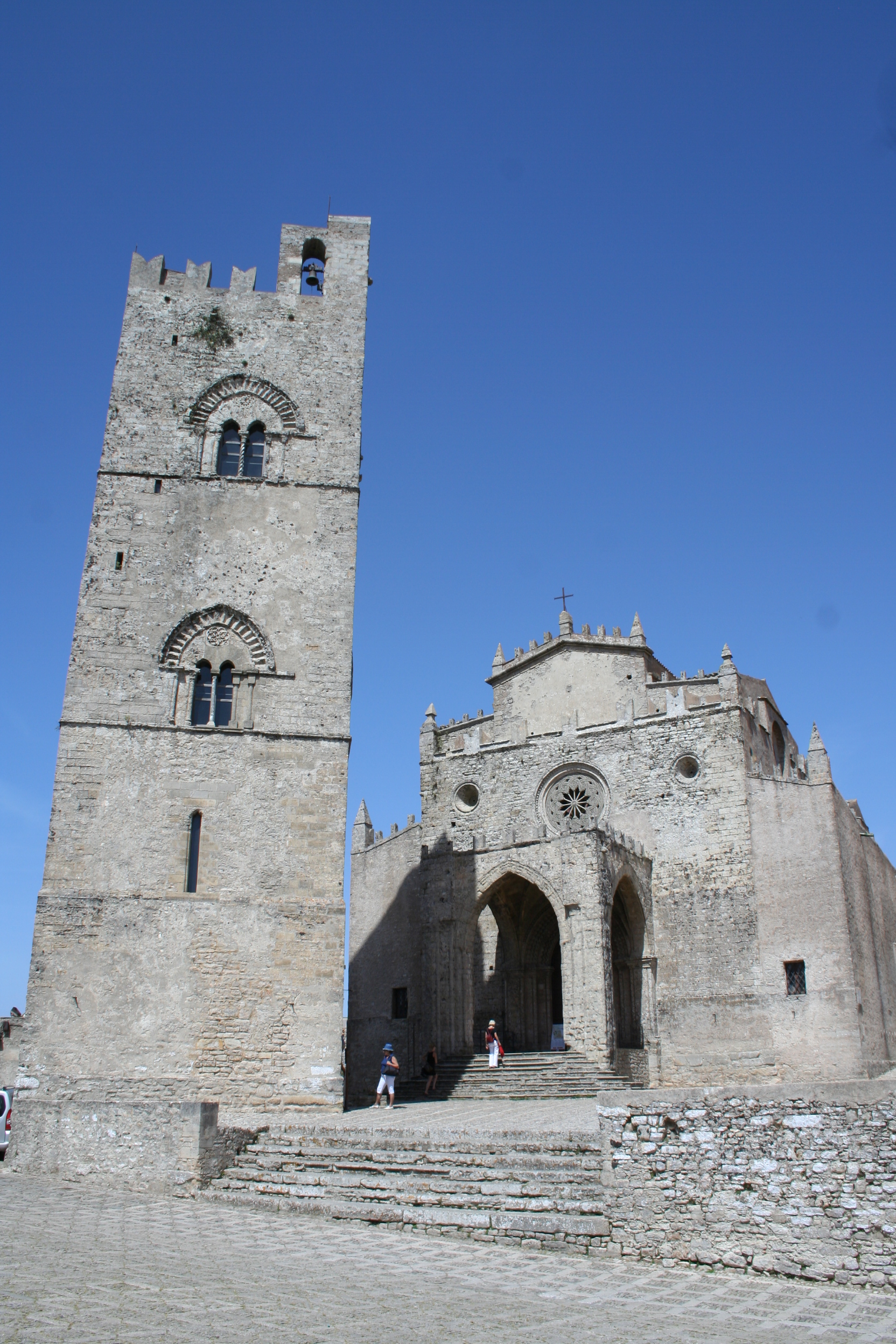
Chiesa Madre Erice Portal und Bell Tower

The Chiesa Matrice is a church in Erice, Sicily, southern Italy. It dates back the beginning of the 14th century (an original fresco dates back to 1420) and is built in the shape of a Latin cross with two entrances. The church is enriched by numerous Baroque altars and paintings from the 17th century. A silver statue of St Anthony of Padua dates back 17th century and is an example of Neapolitan silver-craft.
