= Luigi Ruffo-Scilla =

Italian cardinal

His Eminence Luigi Ruffo-Scilla
- Archbishop of Naples
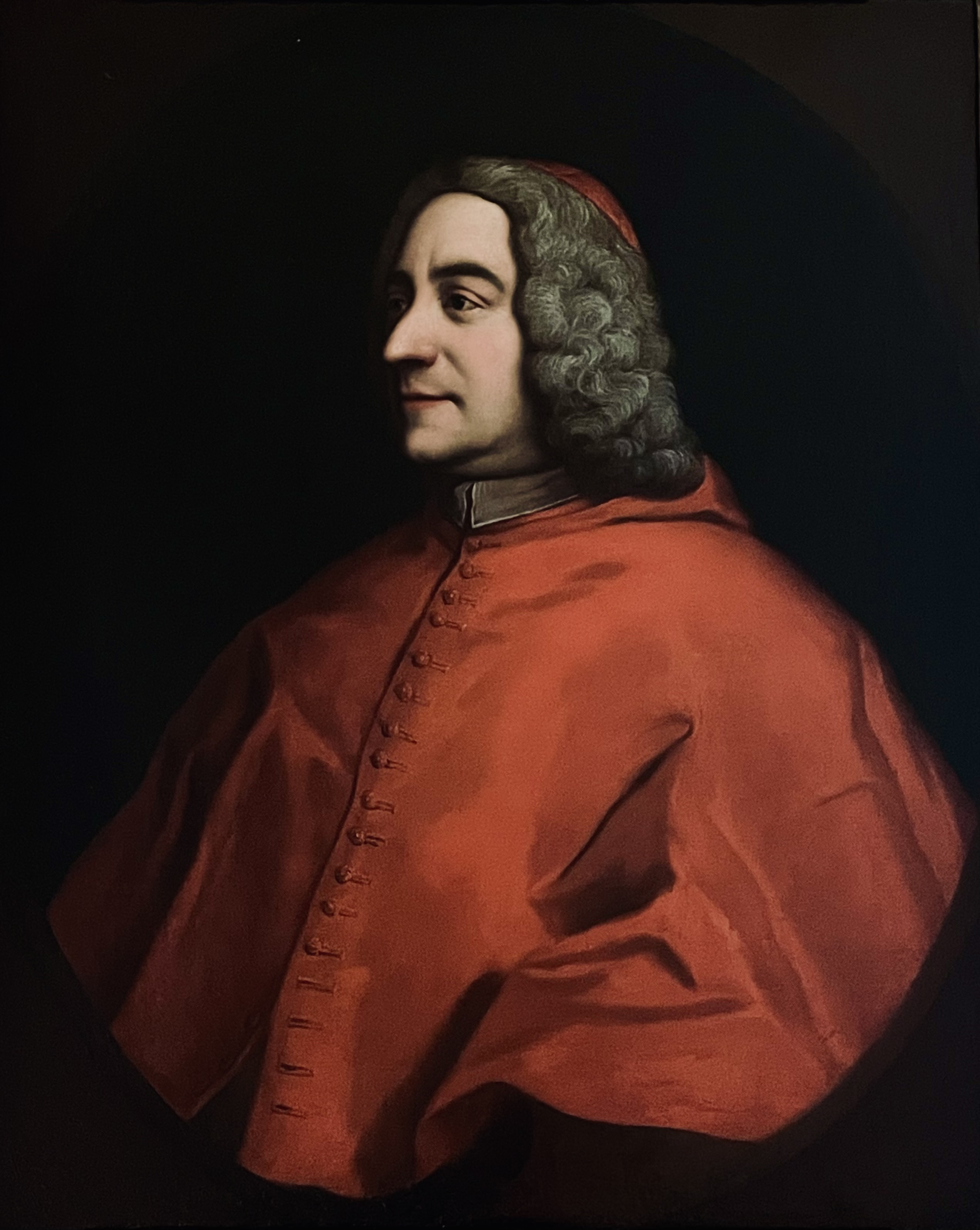
- Church: Roman Catholic Church
- Archdiocese: Naples
- See: Naples
- Appointed: 9 August 1802
- Term ended: 17 November 1832
- Predecessor: Giovanni Vincenzo Monforte
- Successor: Filippo Giudice Caracciolo
- Other posts: Cardinal-Priest of Santi Silvestro e Martino ai Monti (1802–32); Cardinal Protopriest (1830–32)
- Previous posts: Titular Archbishop of Apamea in Bithynia (1785–1801); Apostolic Nuncio to Austria-Hungary (1793–1802)

Orders
- Ordination: 20 May 1780
- Consecration: 24 April 1785 by Francesco Saverio de Zelada
- Created cardinal: 23 February 1801 by Pope Pius VII
- Rank: Cardinal-Priest

Personal details
- Born: Luigi Ruffo-Scilla; 25 August 1750 Sant'Onofrio, Kingdom of Naples
- Died: 17 November 1832 (aged 82) Naples, Kingdom of the Two Sicilies
- Buried: Naples Cathedral
- Parents: Guglielmo Ruffo; Lucrezia Reggio
- Education: La Sapienza

Styles of Luigi Ruffo Scilla
- Reference style: His Eminence
- Spoken style: Your Eminence
- Informal style: Cardinal
- See: none

Luigi Ruffo-Scilla JUD (25 August 1750 – 17 November 1832) was a Cardinal of the Holy Roman Church who served as Apostolic Nuncio to Austria and Archbishop of Naples.

== Early life and priesthood ==
Luigi Ruffo-Scilla was born in Sant'Onofrio, in Calabria. He was the son of Guglielmo Ruffo, Prince of Scilla, and Lucrezia Reggio, of the princes of Campoflorito and Aci. He was educated at La Sapienza University, Rome, where he earned a doctorate in utroque iure (i.e., in both canon and civil law) on 3 December 1772.

He was ordained to the priesthood on 20 May 1780. He worked as a relator of the S.C. of the Good Government and of the Sacred Consulta.

== Episcopate ==
He was appointed Titular Archbishop of Apamea on 11 April 1785 and was consecrated on 24 April 1785. He was served as Nuncio in the Grand Duchy of Tuscany from 26 April 1785 until 1793. He was Nuncio to Austria from 23 August 1793 until 9 August 1802.

== Cardinalate ==
He was created and proclaimed Cardinal-Priest of San Martino ai Monti in the consistory of 23 February 1801. He was appointed as metropolitan archbishop of the see of Naples on 9 August.

On 26 May 1806 he was expelled from his see by the French and relegated to the fortress of Gaeta. In 1809, he was sent to Paris and then confined in Saint-Quentin from 1810 to 1813. (He was one of the "black cardinals" prohibited by Emperor Napoleon I from wearing red cardinal's robes). In 1813, he was sent to Fontainebleau. He was later reunited with Pope Pius VII and other cardinals in the castle of Savona. He returned to Naples on 10 June 1815.

He participated in the conclave of 1823, which elected Pope Leo XII. He participated also in the conclave of 1829, which elected Pope Pius VIII, and in the conclave of 1830-1831, which elected Pope Gregory XVI.

He died in 1832, while still serving as archbishop of Naples at the age of 82.

Catholic Church titles
Preceded by Giovanni Battista Caprara Montecuccoli	Apostolic Nuncio to Austria; 23 August 1793 – 9 August 1802	Succeeded by Antonio Gabriele Severoli
Preceded by Giuseppe Capece Zurlo	Archbishop of Naples; 9 August 1802 – 17 November 1832	Succeeded by Filippo Giudice Caracciolo
