= Apamea Myrlea =

Human settlement

- Location within Turkey
- 40°22′35″N 28°53′00″E
- Location: Turkey
- Region: Bursa Province

Apamea Myrlea (/ˌæpəˈmiːə mərˈliːə/; Ancient Greek: Απάμεια Μύρλεια) was an ancient city and bishopric (Apamea in Bithynia) on the Sea of Marmara, in Bithynia, Anatolia; its ruins are a few kilometers south of Mudanya, Bursa Province in the Marmara Region of Asian Turkey.

== Name ==
To distinguish this city from the many others called Apamea, the name Apamea Myrlea used here adds to the name (Apamea) it was given when rebuilt as an important city the name (Myrlea) it previously bore as a smaller town. It was also referred to as Apamea Myrlēon (Apamea of Myrlea).

== History ==
The town was founded as a colony of the Colophonians and was called Μύρλεια (Myrleia or Myrlea). Philip V of Macedon took the town, as it appears, during his war against the king of Pergamon, and gave it to his ally, King Prusias I of Bithynia, who fortified and enlarged it – indeed almost rebuilt it – around 202 BC, renaming it Ἀπάμεια (transcribed as Apameia, Apamea, or Apamia), after his wife, Apama III.

The place was on the west coast of the Gulf of Gemlik, and northwest of Bursa, then called Prusa, for which it served as a port.

The Romans made Apamea a colonia, apparently in the time of Augustus, or perhaps Julius Caesar, in view of the adjective "Julius" that appears on its coins under Roman rule.Its earlier coins were stamped Ἀπαμέων Μυρλεάνων, but in Roman times they bore the label C.I.C.A. (= Colonia Iulia Concordia Apamea).

When Pliny the Younger was governor of Bithynia, he consulted Trajan about a claim by the colonia not to have its accounts of receipts and expenditures examined by the Roman governor.

A passage of Ulpian shows use of the adjectival form of the name was Apamenus: "Apamena: est in Bithynia colonia Apamena.

== Ecclesiastical history ==
This Apamea in the Late Roman province of Bithynia became the seat of a Christian bishop in the 4th century and was at first a suffragan of Nicaea, but became an autocephalous archdiocese some time before the Fourth Council of Constantinople (Roman Catholic) in 869, at which its archbishop Paulus took part. Apamea was assumed by the Metropolitan of Prousa in 1318, following its decline due to Ottoman conquests in the region.

=== Titular see ===
No longer a residential bishopric, Apamea in Bithynia is today listed by the Catholic Church as a titular see, of the intermediary Archiepiscopal rank.

Since the Latin Catholic archdiocese was thus nominally restored (in ?1633), it has had the following archiepiscopal incumbents, but is vacant since decades :

- Nicola Maria Tedeschi, Benedictines (O.S.B.) (1722.03.02 – death 1741.09.29), eemritate as former Bishop of Lipari (Italy) (1710.03.10 – 1722.02.28)
- Stefano Evodio Assemani (1736 – death 1782.11.24), no actual office recorded
- Luigi Ruffo Scilla (1785.04.11 – 1801.02.23), as Apostolic Nuncio (papal ambassador) to Austria-Hungary (1793.08.23 – 1802.08.09); later Metropolitan Archbishop of Napoli (Naples) (southern Italy) (1802.08.09 – death 1832.11.17), created Cardinal-Priest of S. Martino ai Monti (1802.08.09 – 1832.11.17), became Protopriest of Sacred College of Cardinals (1830.01.24 – 1832.11.17)
- David Mathew (1946.02.20 – death 1975.12.12), first as Apostolic Delegate (papal legation chief) to British East Africa and British West Africa (1946.02.20 – 1953), then Military Vicar of Great Britain (UK) (1954.04.16 – retired 1963.03.23); previously Titular Bishop of Æliæ (1938.12.03 – 1946.02.20) as Auxiliary Bishop of Westminster (England) (1938.12.03 – 1946.02.20)

== See also ==
- List of ancient Greek cities

== Sources and external links ==
- GCatholic, with incumbent bio links
