= Prusa (Bithynia) =

Historic town of ancient Bithynia or of Mysia

Coordinates: 40°11′05″N 29°03′41″E

Prusa or Prousa (Ancient Greek: Προῦσα), or Prusa near Olympus or Prusa under Olympus (Προῦσα ἐπὶ τῷ Ὀλύμπῳ, Προῦσα πρὸς τῷ Ὀλύμπῳ), was an ancient Greek city located between Bithynia and Mysia, situated at the northern foot of the Mysian Olympus. Its site is occupied by the modern city of Bursa.

== History ==
=== Antiquity ===
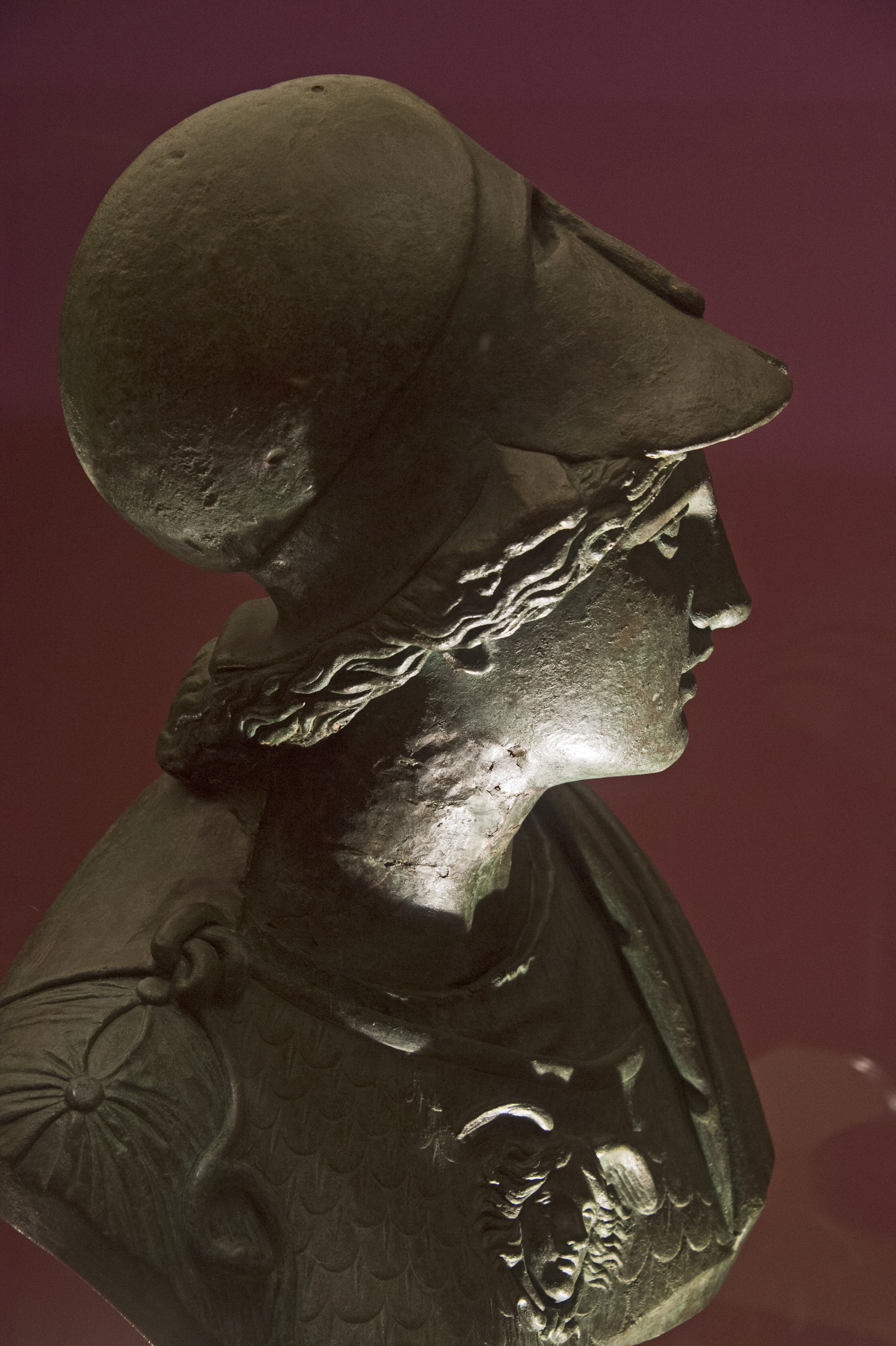
Bronze statue of the goddess Athena

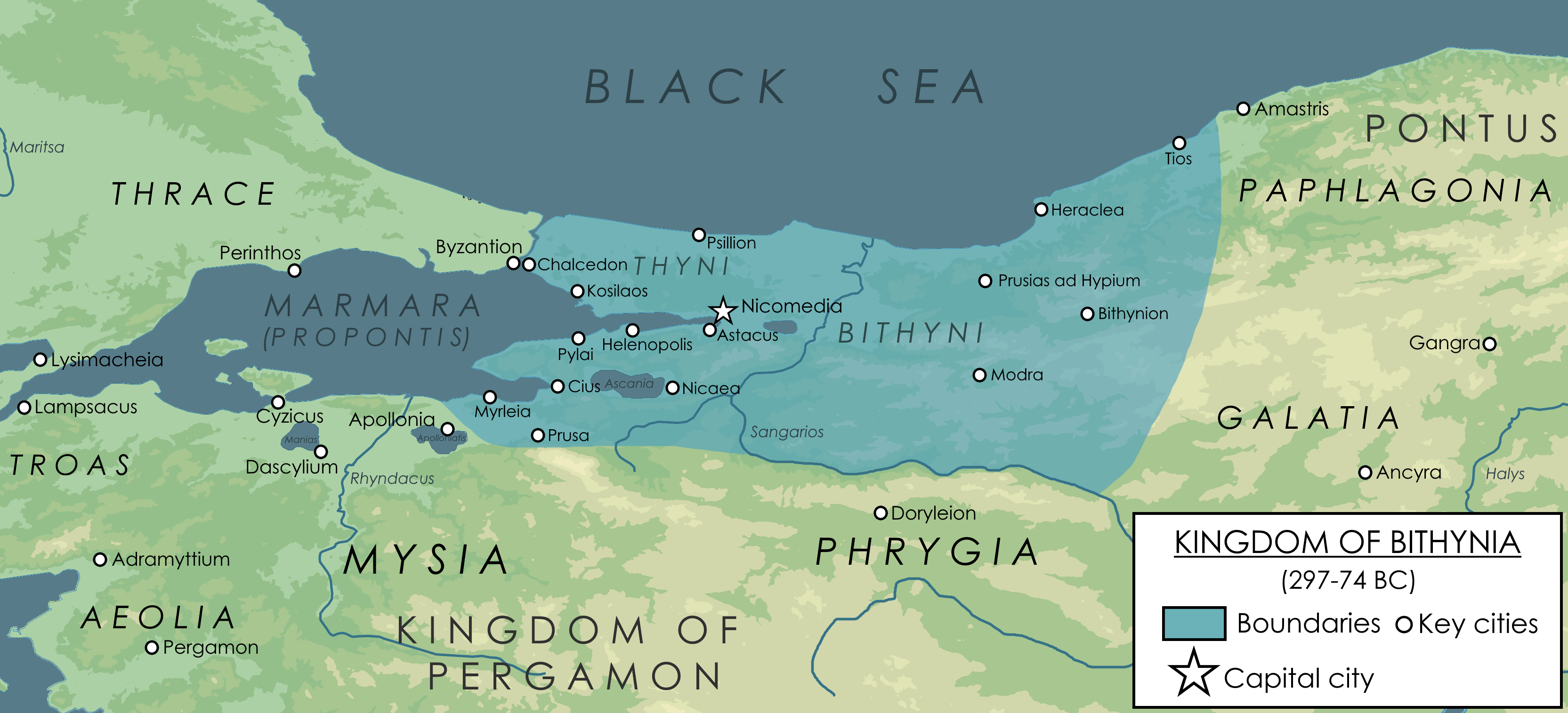
Map of the Hellenistic Kingdom of Bithynia which includes Prusa

According to Strabo, the city was situated on the Mysian Olympus, bordered on the Mysians and Phrygians, and was founded by Prusias, who fought against Croesus. Pliny the Elder claims that the city was founded by Hannibal. Stephanus of Byzantium writes that it was founded by Prusias, who fought against Cyrus. Modern scholarship concludes that the original settlement may have been built in the Archaic or Classical period, but was reorganized by Prusias I of Bithynia, who transformed it into a city in the southernmost fortified part of his realm.

The main products the city produced were cereals, linen, wine, and lumber from the slopes of the Mysian Olympus. The lumber trade was also a basic means of maintenance in the settlements which were part of the administrative district of Prusa, such as Sarcotyle, Tataulenon Kome, and Eikote.

Dio Chrysostom, a native of the city in the 1st and 2nd centuries, remarked in his Orations that:

[...] although Prusa is not the largest of our cities and has not been settled for the longest time, it is more illustrious than many, even in the estimation of the outside world, and that it has long caused its citizens to rank, not last, or even third or second, in competition with virtually all Greeks everywhere.

During the Roman period the city was well-governed and continued to flourish. Prusa was celebrated for its warm baths that bore the name of the royal waters or the royal fountain.

=== Middle Ages ===
==== Early Middle Ages ====
During the Byzantine period Prusa prospered, becoming famous for its numerous Roman and Byzantine baths, while still retaining a pagan element, as feasts dedicated to Artemis were held in the gardens surrounding the city even as far as the year 450. The Byzantine Emperor Justinian I built a palace in Prusa, settled Goths there, and transformed it into a garrison city in 562, where imperial guards were stationed. He also built the foundations that would transform Prusa into a famous silk textile manufacturing centre at the end of the Silk Road by the middle of the 6th century. Justinian II settled Slavs in the city in 688.

Between 720 and 730, the Church of Christ and Saint Stephanos was constructed.

Prusa was captured and destroyed by Sayf al-Dawla in the 10th century.

==== High Middle Ages ====
Prusa was captured by the Seljuks in the 11th century, but it was recovered by the Byzantines during the First Crusade.

In the spring of 1184, the usurper Andronikos I Komnenos led the imperial army against the cities of Nicaea, Prusa and Lopadion, which were opposed to his accession to the throne. They were led by Isaac Angelos, his family, and other prominent Byzantine aristocrats. After dealing with Nicaea, Andronikos established an entrenched camp south of Prusa, where the terrain was favourable. The city was defended by Theodore Angelos, Manuel Lachanas and Leon Synesios. According to Niketas Choniates:

Andronikos, who was given to loquaciousness, attached winged words to the volant shafts of missiles and shot these into the city. These letters borne through the air offered encouragement for a change, and amnesty for evils, should they open the gates, welcome him inside, and seize Theodore Angelos and Lachanas of the marketplace and the witless Synesios, to use Andronikos's words, as well as their partisans, and give them up. He repeated this for a considerable number of days. [...] Prusa was a city of beautiful towers, encompassed by formidable walls which were double in the southern region. When the two armies joined in battle there were many sallies and many fell on both sides.

Eventually, a portion of the wall crumbled after being repeatedly hit by siege engines. The defenders, believing the entire section of the wall had collapsed, panicked and abandoned their posts. Thus, the imperial army entered Prusa through the gates and through scaling ladders, and took the city by storm. Prusa was plundered and devastated. Theodore Angelos was blinded, placed on a donkey, and left in the wilderness, while Leon Synesios, Manuel Lachanas and forty others were hanged on the branches of trees around the city. Many others had their fingers clipped, hands cut, legs severed and eyes gouged out.

After the Fourth Crusade, the Crusaders under Peter of Bracieux defeated a Byzantine force near Poimanenon and were welcomed inside Lopadion in December 1204. They then marched out of Lopadion and took up positions south of Prusa. They demanded for admittance into the city, but the Prusaeans, who had gathered provisions for a long siege, refused and instead let out a sortie, killing many Latin nobles with arrows. Because of Prusa's strong defences and due to the casualties they had sustained from the sortie, the Latins decided to retreat. At that moment, the Prusaeans pursued them in large numbers. This action inspired other Byzantines to resist the Crusaders, which culminated in an ambush in a mountain pass on 19 March 1205, in which many Latins were killed, as well as in another battle near Caesarea, where many Latins were also slain.

==== Late Middle Ages ====
The city suffered much during the Ottoman conquests of the region, as it was surrounded and isolated from the countryside. It fell in 1326, following a lengthy siege, and served as the Ottoman capital for more than a century. The name Prusa evolved into Mprusa, which later became the modern name of the city of Bursa.

== Ecclesiastical history ==
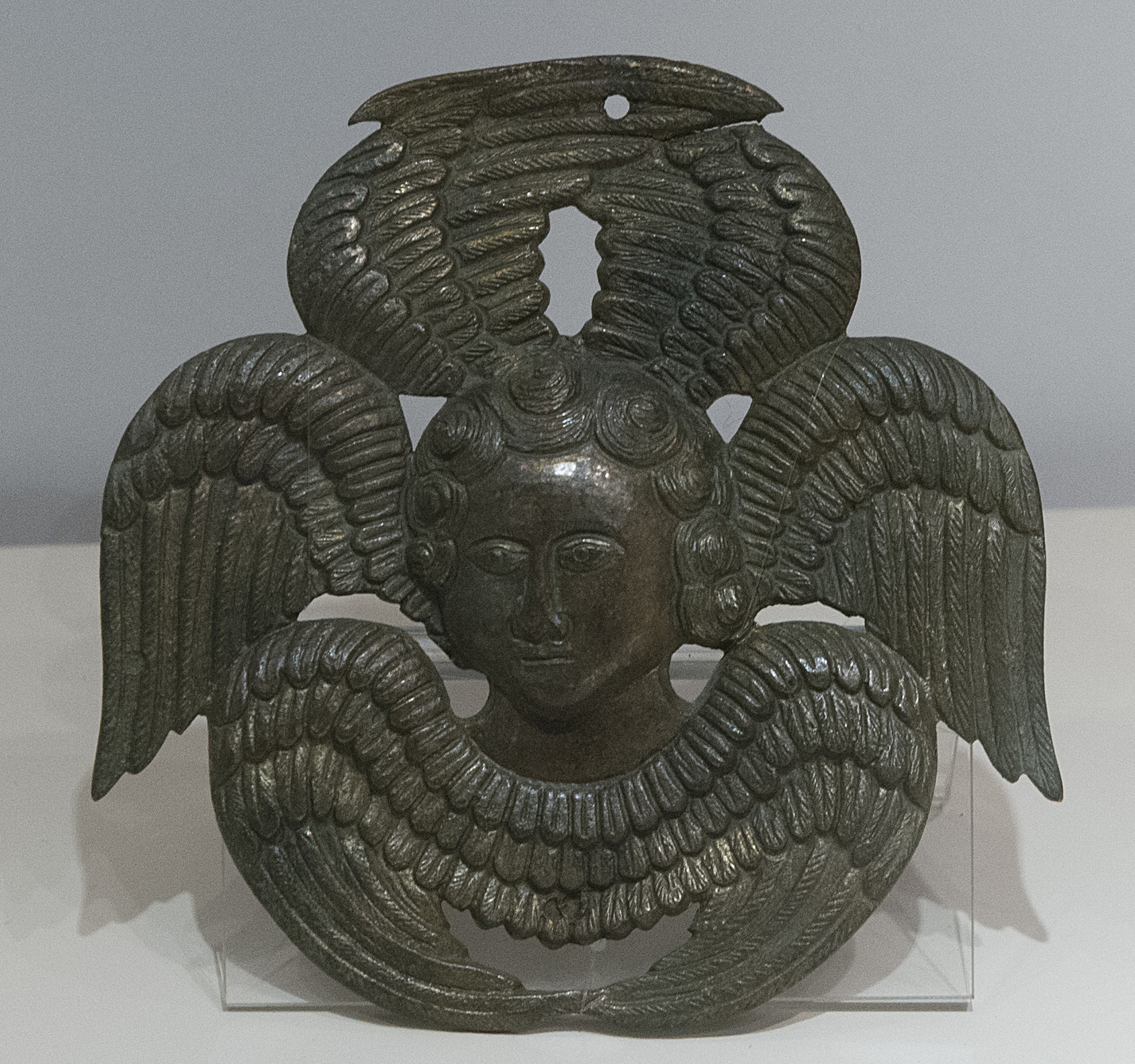
Byzantine depiction of a seraph

By 1318 the metropolis of Prusa was described as being "under heavy pressure" because of Ottoman invasions. In the same year, it assumed the administration of the archbishopric of Apamea Myrlea and the monastery of Hosius Eustratius. In 1327 and in 1331 the metropolitan of Prusa appears as Proedros of the church of Bizye, and a legitimate metropolitan appears only in 1347. Between 1347 and 1386 Prusa had no metropolitan, and Nicaea was to receive the metropolis in 1381 as per decision of a synod. However, in 1386 a new metropolitan assumed the seat of Prusa, and the metropolis would go on to administer the metropolis of Kotyaion in the same year, and the metropolis of Nicomedia in 1401.

== Notable people ==
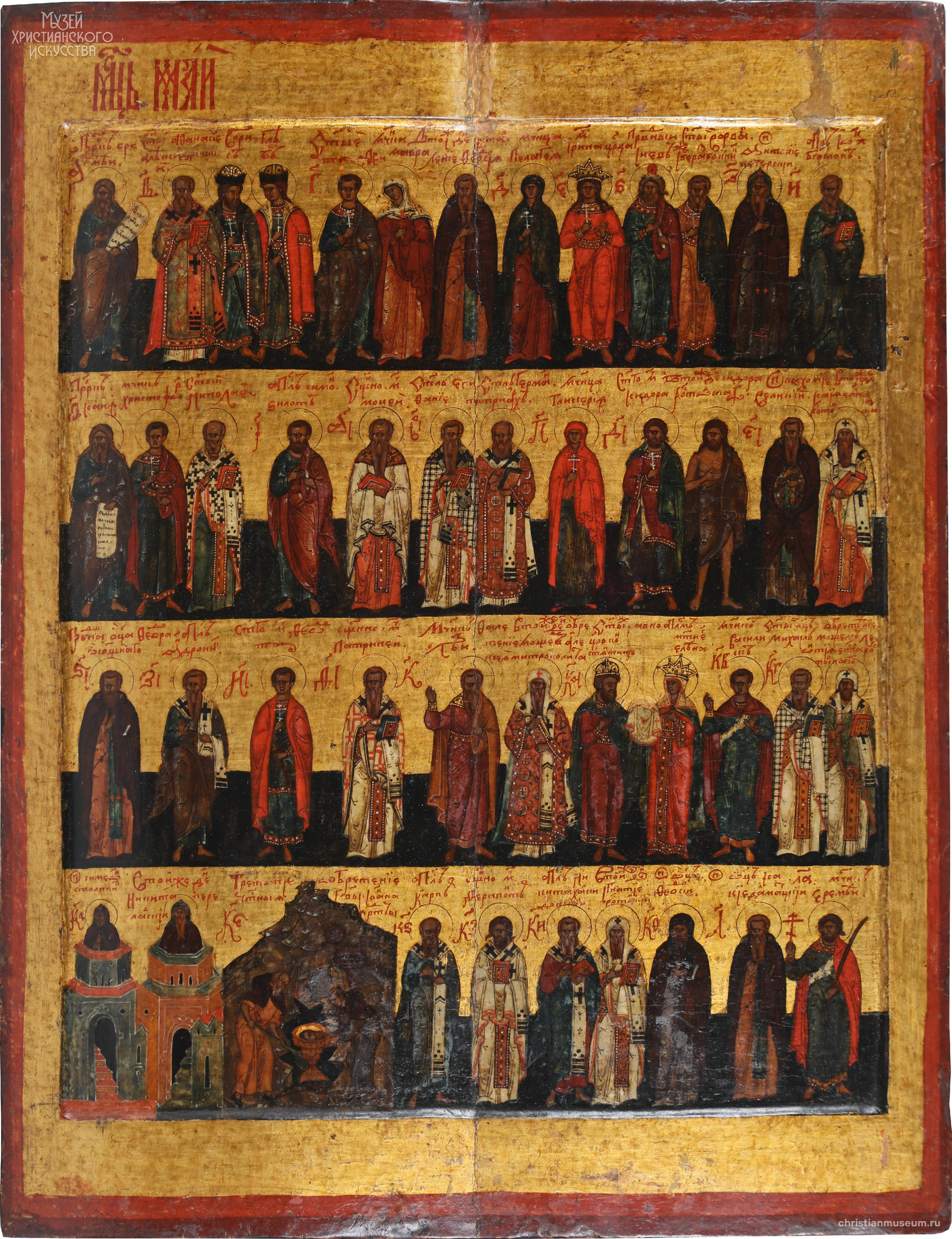
Russian 17th century icon of Christian Saints whose feast day is in May, which includes Saint Patrikios as the fourth figure in the third row

- Dio Chrysostom (c. 40–115 AD), Greek orator, writer, philosopher and historian.
- Flavius Archippus (1st century AD), Greek philosopher.
- Saint Patrikios (3rd century AD), bishop of Prusa and Christian martyr.
- Saints Acacius, Menander and Polyainus (3rd century AD), friends of Patrikios and Christian martyrs.
- Saint Timotheos (died 363 AD), bishop of Prusa and Christian martyr.

== Gallery ==
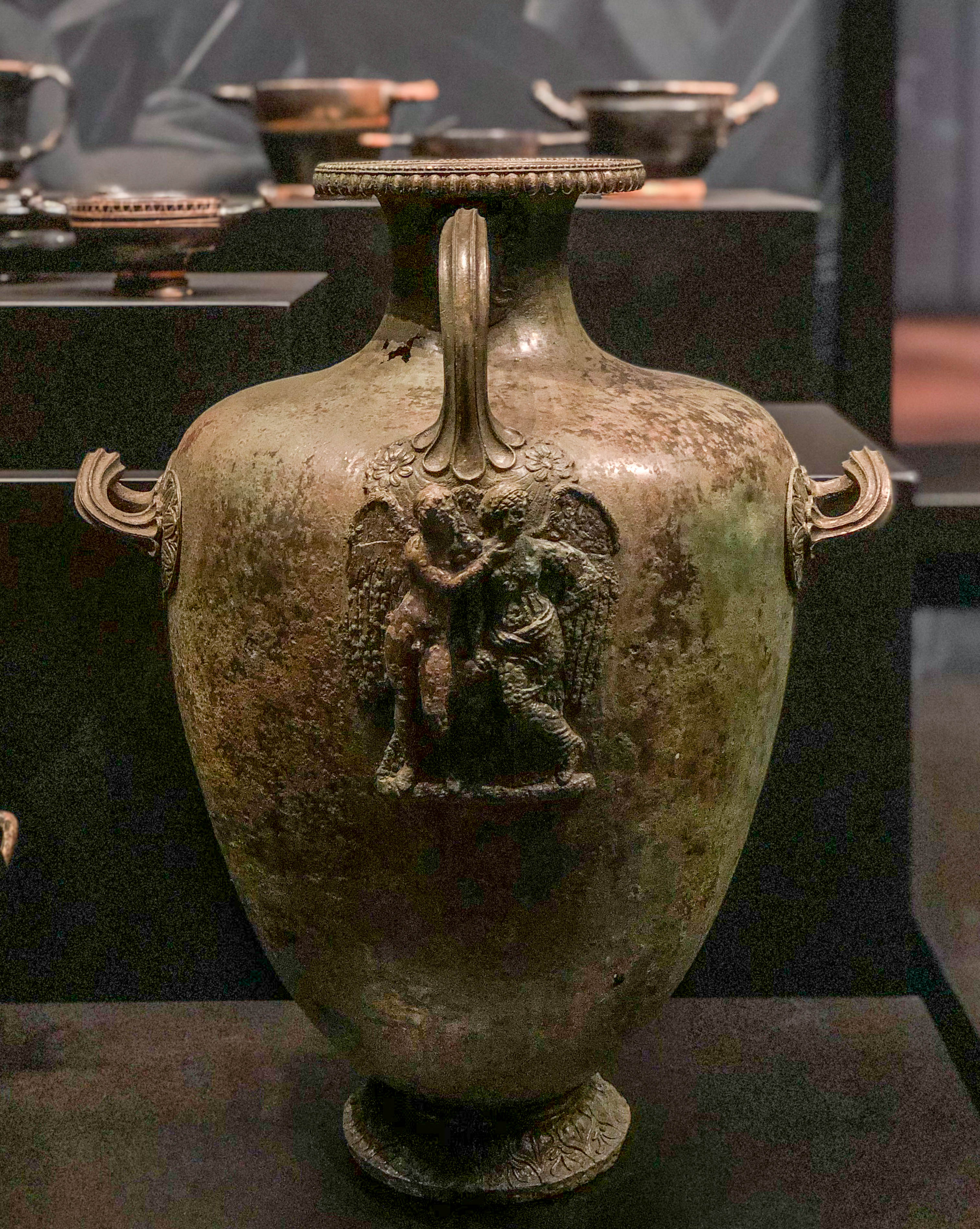
Ancient Greek hydria

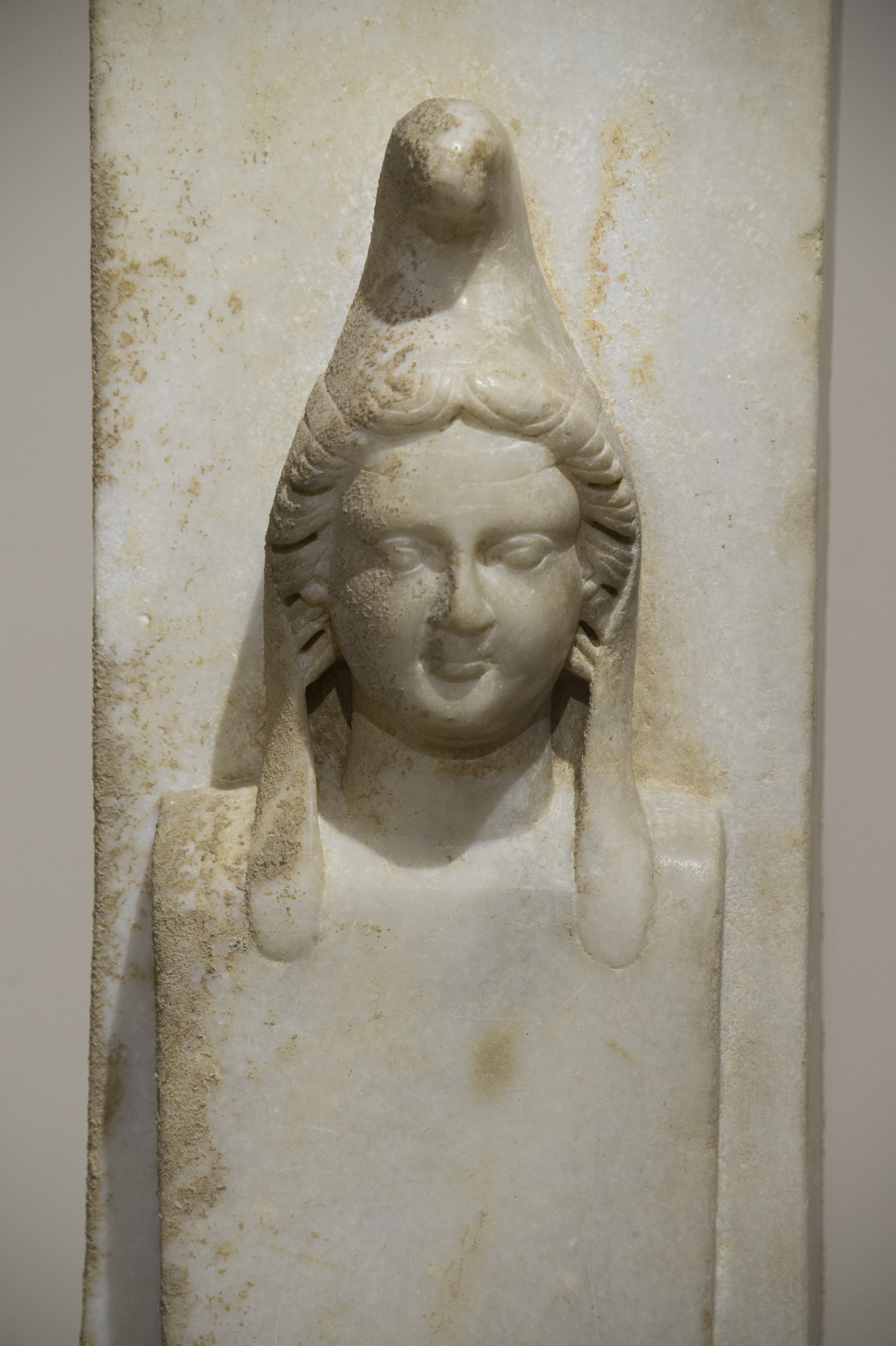
Herm of the god Attis

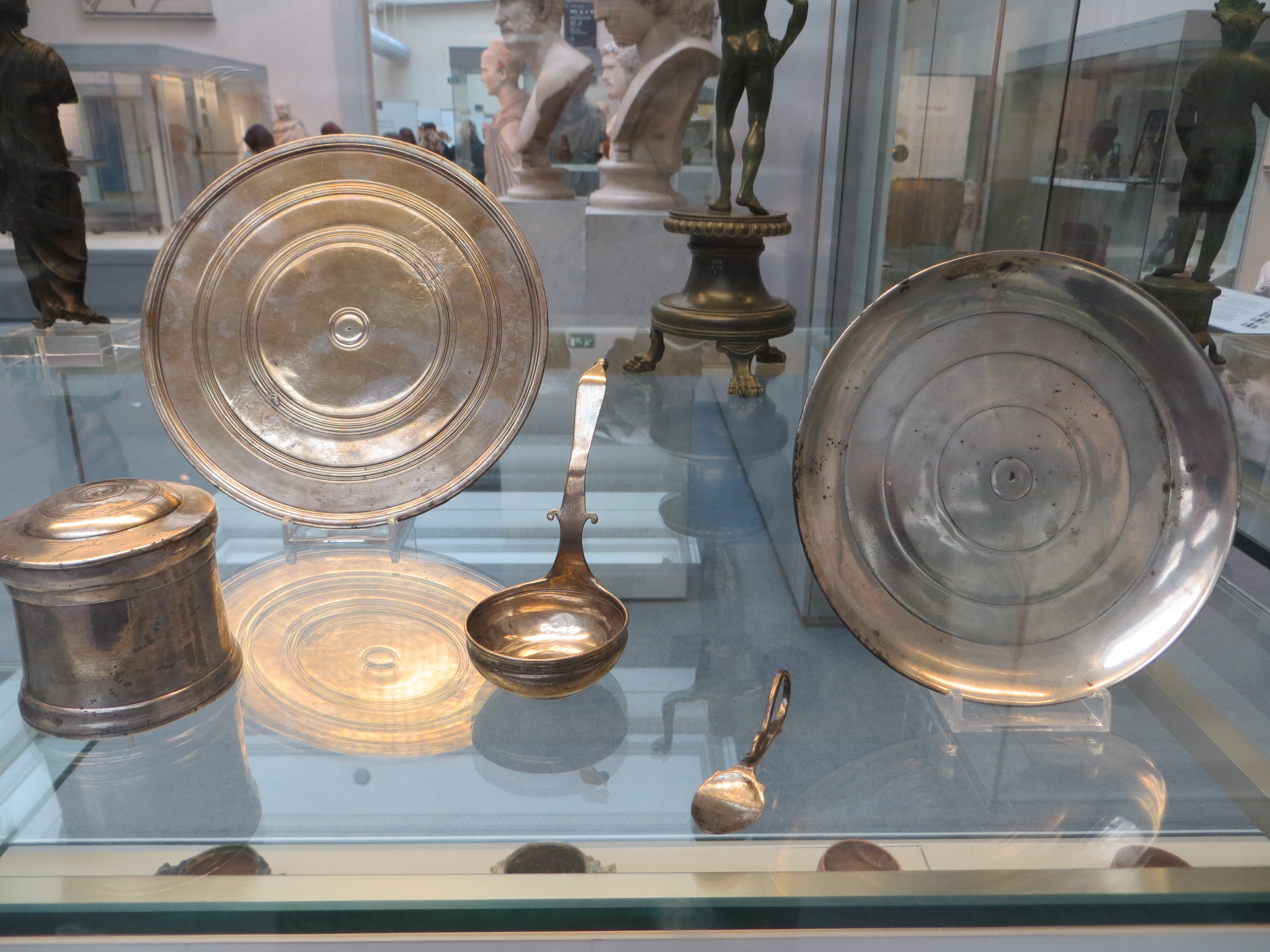
Bursa Treasure displayed in the British Museum

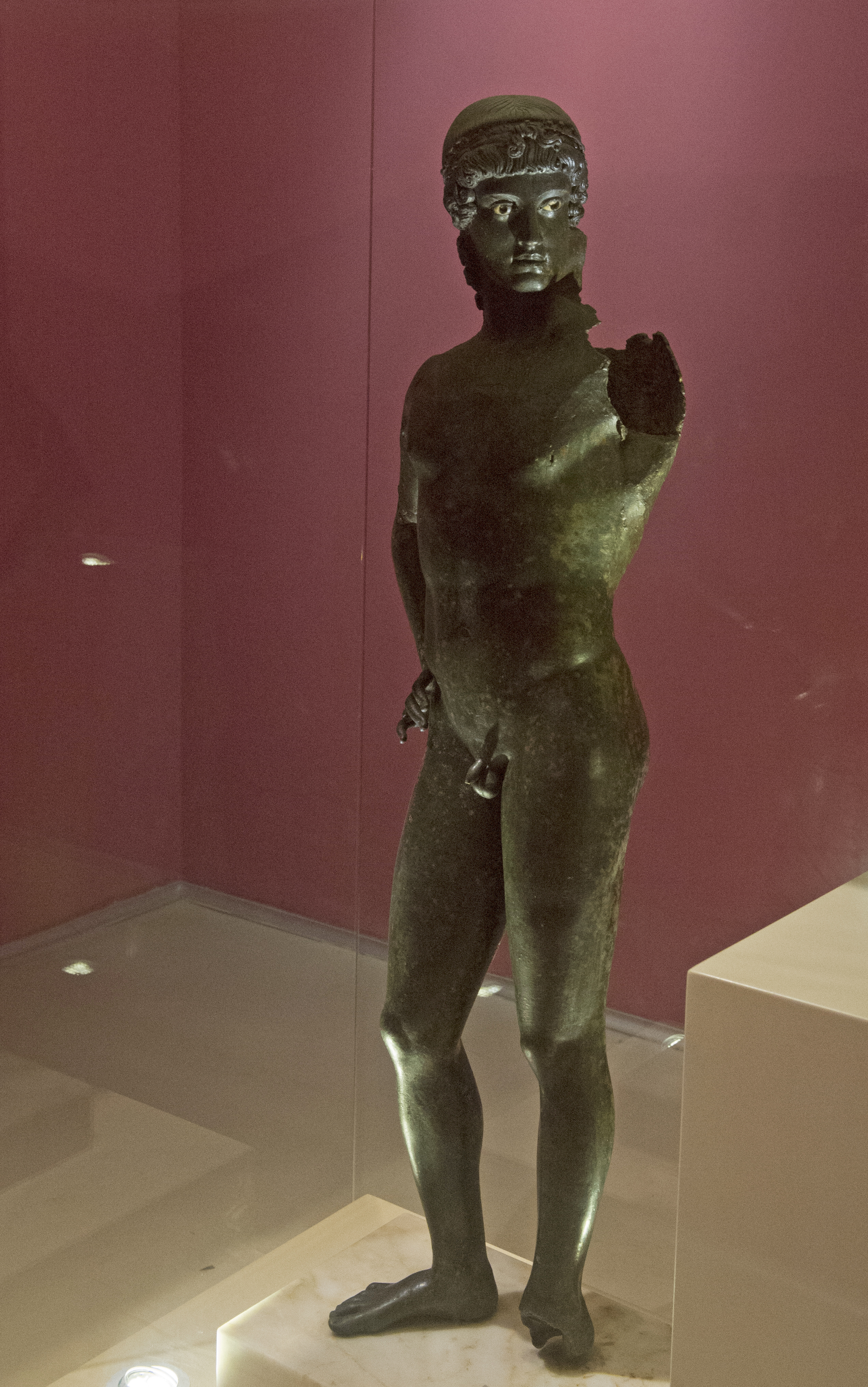
Bronze statue of the god Apollo

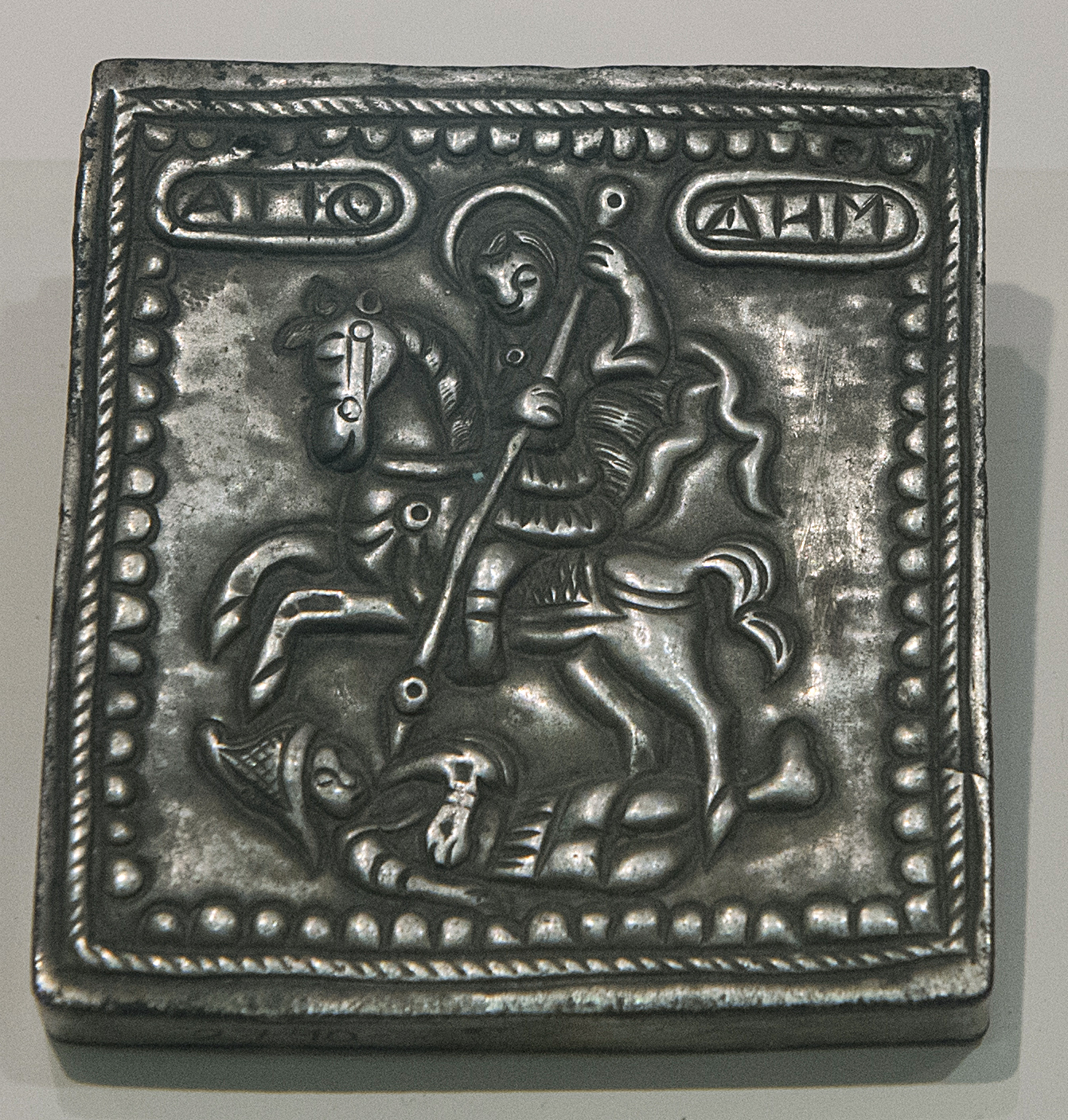
Byzantine box with Saint Demetrius of Thessaloniki

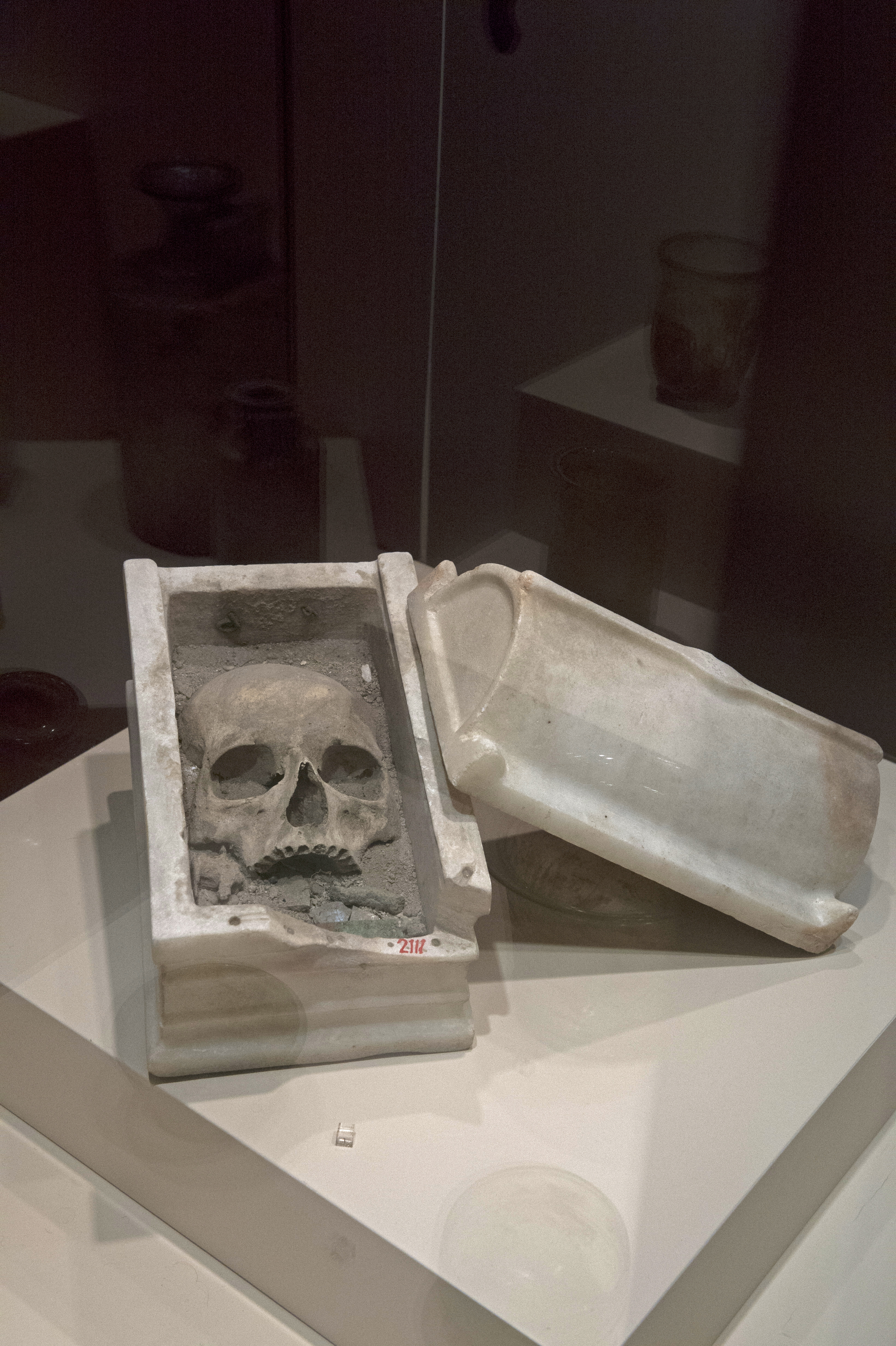
Byzantine box with a skull

== See also ==
- List of ancient Greek cities
- Bursa Treasure

== Bibliography ==
- Corsten, Thomas (1991). Die Inschriften von Prusa ad Olympum. Österreichische Akademie der Wissenschaften. ISBN 9783774925168.
- "Discourses by Dio Chrysostom. The Forty-fourth Discourse: An Address of Friendship for his Native Land on its Proposing Honours for him". University of Chicago. Archived from the original on 25 October 2010.
- Dumper, Michael; Stanley, Bruce E. (2007). Cities of the Middle East and North Africa. ABC-CLIO. ISBN 978-1-57607-919-5 – via Internet Archive Books.
- "Brusa" . Encyclopædia Britannica. Vol. 4 (11th ed.). 1910.
- "Bursa, Turkey". Encyclopædia Britannica. Archived from the original on 23 March 2025.
- H. Gerber (1976), "Guilds in Seventeenth Century Bursa", Asian and African Studies
- Harris, Jonathan (2014). Byzantium and the Crusades (2nd ed.). Bloomsbury Publishing. ISBN 9781780937366.
- Hasluck, F. W. (July 1906). "Bithynica". Annual of the British School at Athens. 13. doi:10.1017/S006824540000294X. S2CID 246245111.
- Klaus, Belke (2020). Bithynien und Hellespont. Part 2. Tabula Imperii Byzantini. Vol. 13, 2. Vienna: Verlag der Österreichischen Akademie der Wissenschaften. ISBN 978-3-7001-8329-7.
- O City of Byzantium: Annals of Niketas Choniates. Translated by Magoulias, Harry J. Wayne State University Press. 1984. ISBN 0-8143-1764-2.
- Mango, Cyril; Ševčenko, Ihor (1973). "Some Churches and Monasteries on the South Shore of the Sea of Marmara". Dumbarton Oaks Papers. 18. doi:10.2307/1291343. JSTOR 1291343.
- Meinekii, Augusti (1849). Stephani Byzantii Ethnicorum Quae Supersunt. Berolini.
- Melmoth, WIlliam (1915). Pliny Letters. Vol. 2. William Heinemann.
- "Hieromartyr Patrick, Bishop of Prusa, and his companions". Orthodox Church in America.
- Pliny Natural History II Libri III-VII. Translated by Rackham. Harvard University Press. 1967.
- Smith, William (1854). Dictionary of Greek and Roman geography. Walton & Maberly.
- "Strabo's Geographica Book XII.4.3". LacusCurtius.
- Talbert, Richard, ed. (2000). Barrington Atlas of the Greek and Roman World. Princeton University Press. ISBN 978-0-691-03169-9, with accompanying Map-by-Map Directory.
- Vryonis, Speros (1971). The Decline of Medieval Hellenism in Asia Minor and the Process of Islamization from the Eleventh through the Fifteenth Century. University of California Press. ISBN 0-520-01597-5.
- Yonge, Charles Duke (1854). The Deipnosophists or Banquet of the Larned by Athenæus. Vol. 1. Henry G. Bohn.
