= Battle of Licosa (846) =

Naval conflict near Salerno, Italy

Coordinates: 40.15°N 14.54°E

- Southern Italy in the 9th century
Date	846
Location	Licosa
Result	Campanian League victory

Belligerents
Campanian League: Duchy of Gaeta; Duchy of Amalfi; Duchy of Naples; Duchy of Sorrento	Muslim fleet (Note: Likely led by the Arab Aghlabid dynasty. See article for details.)

Commanders and leaders
Caesar of Naples; Sergius I of Naples	Unknown

Casualties and losses
Minimal	Heavy

The naval battle of Licosa was fought in the year 846 near the homonymous promontory, between the combined fleet of the Byzantine duchies of Naples, Amalfi, Gaeta and Sorrento, inspired by the Duke Sergius I of Naples and led by his son Caesar, and the Saracen fleet. The battle ended in favor of the Neapolitans and their allies, as they defeated the Muslims.

== Background ==
The Aghlabid invasion of Byzantine-controlled Sicily in 827 and the fall of Palermo in 831 turned the island into a base for further raids. From then on, the coastal cities of southern Italy were under constant threat of attack by Saracen pirates. The fragmentation of power in southern Italy allowed Muslim mercenaries to gain a foothold on the mainland. Local rulers, prioritizing their immediate, petty, and often internecine power struggles over the broader existential threat, hired these Saracens as soldiers. In 837, during a war with Prince Sicard of Benevento, Duke Andrew II of Naples was the first to bring in North African mercenaries to gain an advantage against a Christian rival. After Sicard's assassination in 839, the ensuing civil war between Radelchis I of Benevento and Siconulf of Salerno escalated the conflict. Both sides aggressively recruited Saracen troops, using them to ravage enemy territory. These mercenary groups often operated independently, raiding and establishing fortified bases, going from invited allies to permanent threats that terrorized the coasts of Campania for decades, leading to the destruction of cities and the capture of slaves.

After the capture of Byzantine Messina (843) and the crushing victory at the Battle of Butera (846), which cost the Byzantines nearly 10,000 men, the Saracens advanced further into Calabria and the southern Italian peninsula. The Aghlabids, and later other Muslim pirates from North Africa and Sicily, began to seriously threaten the safety of trading voyages in the Tyrrhenian Sea and to attack Christian settlements in the central part of the peninsula. The Saracens plundered the outskirts of Gaeta and Salerno and also captured several coastal islands, including Ponza, from where they could raid along the entire coast of Campania.

== Battle ==
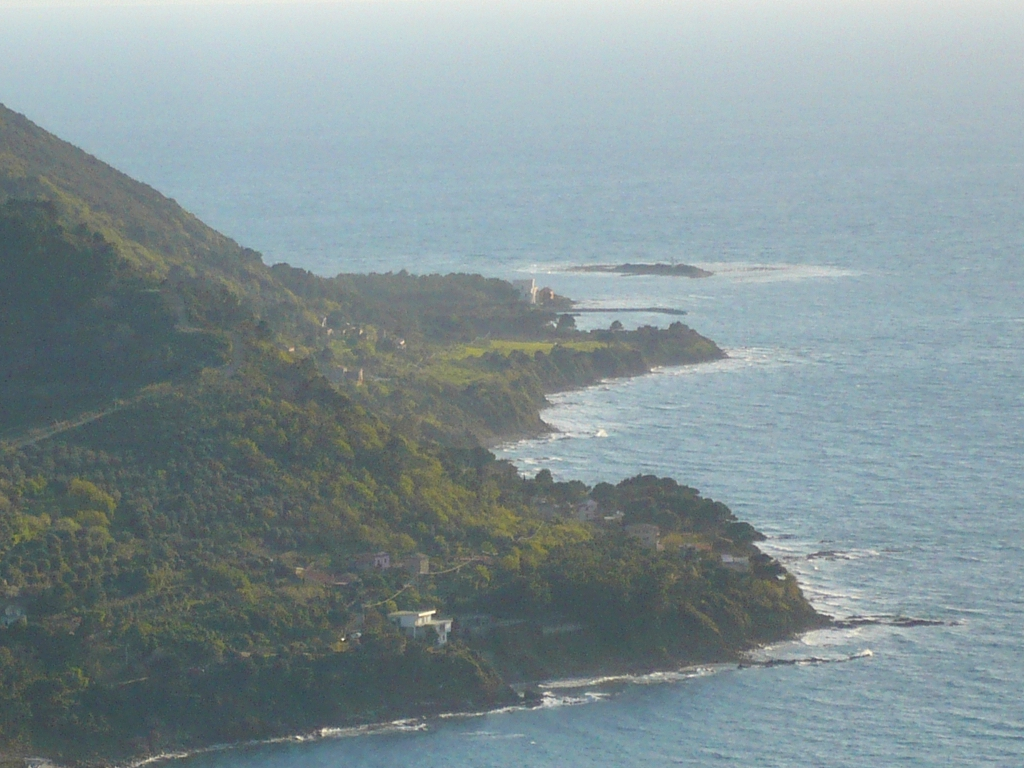
Overview of the promontory and the island of Licosa.

Presumably, even before the arrival of the Saracen fleet in the Tyrrhenian Sea, the Italians were aware of the preparations for an Arab invasion, perhaps thanks to Italian traders. This allowed the Duke of Naples, Sergius I, to begin negotiations with other rulers of Campania and successfully conclude a military alliance with them. This union, which later historians called the "League of Campania", included Sergius I of Naples, Marin of Amalfi, Constantine and Marin I of Gaeta, as well as the ruler of the Duchy of Sorrento. According to Ferdinand Gregorovius, this "unification became the first medieval league."

To counter the Saracen attack, the members of the League of Campania created a united fleet. Some sources report that its command was entrusted to the tribune Gregorio Brancazio, the most noble of Neapolitan citizens. However, this information is most likely unreliable, and the fleet of the Christian principalities was led directly by the Duke of Naples, Sergius I.

Before this battle, the coalition had already reconquered the island of Ponza from the Saracens, which had been used as a naval base to threaten the Campanian coast. Upon learning that the Arab fleet was heading towards the Campanian coast, the combined fleet of the Campanian League sailed to meet their adversaries near present-day Cilento and engaged in battle near Cape Licosa. Despite the Saracen forces having a significant numerical advantage, the Coalition achieved victory.

== Aftermath ==
The Battle of Licosa was the first major Italian victory over the Saracens. Before this, the Arabs had not encountered serious military resistance on the Italian peninsula for over thirty years.

The Christian victory prevented a major Saracen invasion of Campania. However, it was unable to fully secure the coasts of Campania, as in the same year the Arabs raided the port of Misenum, which belonged to Duke Sergius I. This attack was perhaps the Emir of Palermo's revenge for the defeat of his fleet by the Neapolitans.

Shortly after the Battle of Licosa, another Saracen fleet, led by the Aghlabid Emir of Ifriqiyah, landed an army at Ostia. They reached Rome in August and plundered the city's outskirts, but failed to breach the Aurelian Walls. From there, the Arabs reached Gaeta in November, but were defeated by the combined fleet of Naples and Amalfi, commanded by the son of the Duke of Naples.

These successes further strengthened the ties of goodwill between the rulers of Naples, Amalfi, Gaeta, and Sorrento. Their alliance, which lasted several years, played a decisive role in the defeat of the Saracen fleet at the Battle of Ostia in 849.

== See also ==
- Arab raid against Rome
- Battle of Ostia
- History of Islam in southern Italy
