= History of Islam in southern Italy =

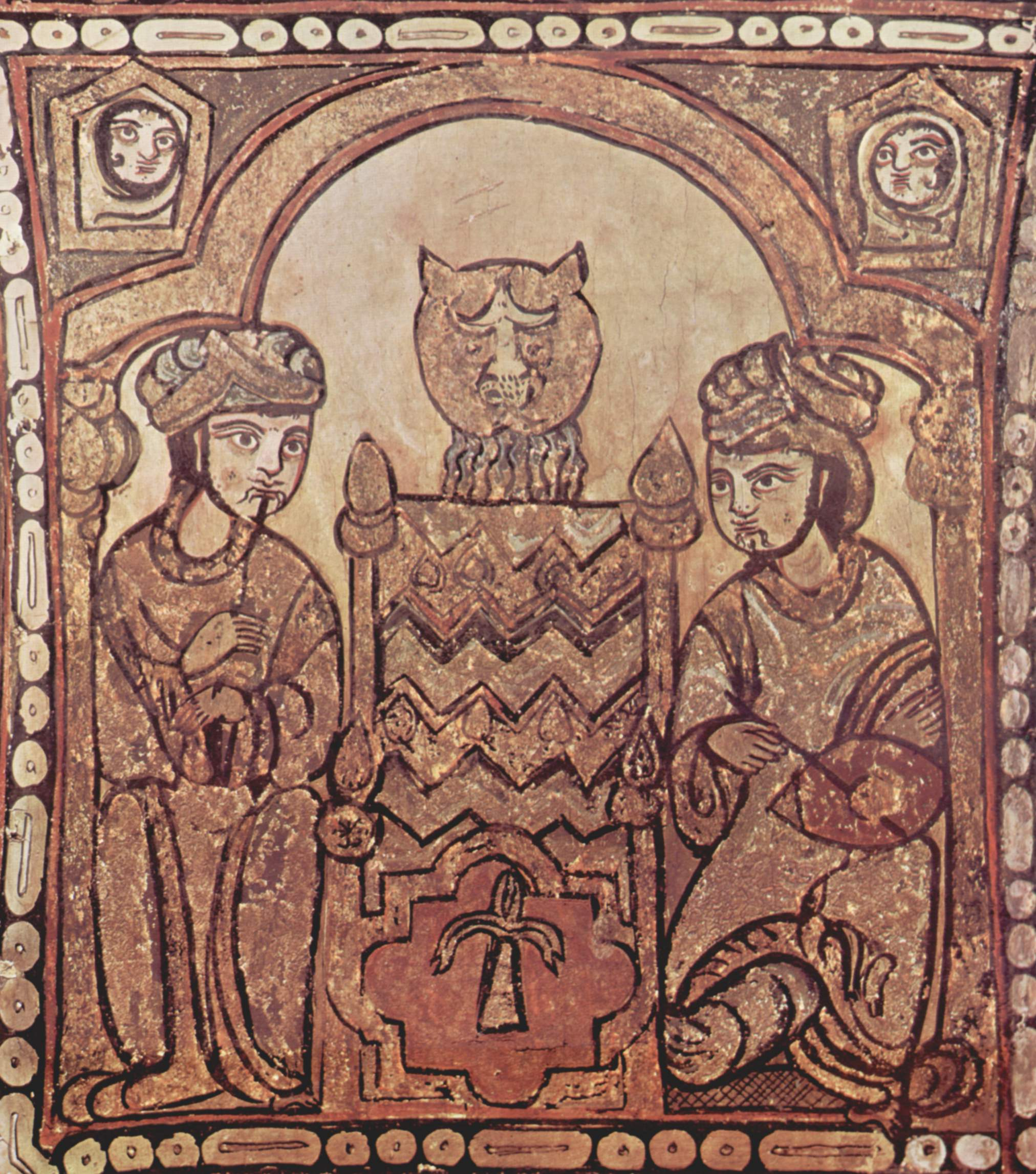
Arabic painting made for the Norman kings (c. 1150) in the Palazzo dei Normanni, originally the emir's palace at Palermo

The history of Islam in Sicily and southern Italy began with the Arab conquest of Mazara, Sicily in 827. The subsequent rule of Sicily and Malta started in the 10th century. The Emirate of Sicily lasted from 831 until 1061, and controlled the whole island by 965. Though Sicily was the primary Muslim stronghold in Italy, some temporary footholds, the most substantial of which was the port city of Bari (occupied from 847 until 871), were established on the mainland peninsula, especially in mainland southern Italy, though Arab raids, mainly those of Muhammad I ibn al-Aghlab, reached as far north as Naples, Rome and the northern region of Piedmont. The Arab raids were part of a larger struggle for power in Italy and Europe, with Christian Byzantine, Frankish, Norman and indigenous Italian forces also competing for control. Arabs were sometimes allied with various Christian factions against other factions.

In 965 the Kalbids established independence from the Fatimid Caliphate. In 1061, the Normans took Messina, and by 1072, Palermo and its citadel were captured. In 1091, Noto also fell to the Normans, and the conquest was complete. Malta fell later that year, though the Arab administration was kept in place, marking the final chapter of this period. The conquests of the Normans established Roman Catholicism firmly in the region, where Eastern Christianity had been prominent during the time of Byzantine rule and even remained significant during Islamic period. In 1245, Muslims were exiled to Lucera by order of Frederick II, king of Sicily. In 1300, Giovanni Pipino da Barletta, count of Altamura, seized Lucera and again exiled its population, bringing an end to the medieval Muslim presence in Italy.

== Sicily ==
=== First Arab attacks on Sicily (652–827) ===
The first attacks by Arab ships on Sicily, then part of the Byzantine Empire, occurred in 652 under the Rashidun Caliphate of Uthman. Olympius, the Byzantine exarch of Ravenna, came to Sicily to oust the invaders but failed.

A second Arab expedition to Sicily occurred in 669. This time, a strong, ravaging force consisting of 200 ships from Alexandria attacked the island. They sacked Syracuse, Sicily and returned to Egypt after a month of pillaging. After the Arab conquest of North Africa (completed around 700), attacks from Arab fleets repeated in 703 (during the reign of Musa ibn Nusayr as governor of Ifriqiya 703–715), 728, 729, 730, 731 (during the reign of Ubayda ibn Abd al-Rahman al-Sulami as governor of Ifriqiya 727–732), 733, and 734 (during the reign of Uqba ibn Qudama as governor of Ifriqiya 732–734).

The first true conquest expedition was launched in 740. In that year, Habib ibn Abi Obeida al-Fihri, who had participated in the 728 attack, successfully captured Syracuse. Though ready to conquer the whole island, the expedition was forced to return to Tunisia by a Berber revolt. A second attack in 752 aimed only to sack Syracuse again.

In 805, the imperial patrician of Sicily, Constantine, signed a ten-year truce with Ibrahim I ibn al-Aghlab, Emir of Ifriqiya, but this did not prevent Arab fleets from other areas of Africa and Spain from attacking Sardinia and Corsica from 806 to 821. In 812, Ibrahim's son, Abdallah I, sent an invasion force to conquer Sicily. His ships were first harassed by the intervention of Gaeta and Amalfi and were later destroyed in great number by a tempest. However, they managed to conquer the island of Lampedusa and to ravage Ponza and Ischia in the Tyrrhenian Sea. A further agreement between the new patrician Gregorius and the emir established the freedom of commerce between southern Italy and Ifriqiya. After a further attack in 819 by Mohammed ibn-Adballad, cousin of Amir Ziyadat Allah I of Ifriqiya, no subsequent Arab attacks on Sicily are mentioned by sources until 827.

=== Conquest of Sicily (827–902) ===
==== Euphemius and Asad ====
The Arab conquest of Sicily and parts of southern Italy lasted 75 years. According to some sources, the conquest was spurred by Euphemius, a Byzantine commander who feared punishment by Emperor Michael II for a sexual indiscretion. After a short-lived conquest of Syracuse, he was proclaimed emperor but was compelled by loyal forces to flee to the court of Ziyadat Allah in Africa. The latter agreed to conquer Sicily, with the promise to leave it to Euphemius in exchange for a yearly tribute. He entrusted its conquest to the 70-year-old qadi Asad ibn al-Furat. The Muslim force numbered 10,000 infantry, 700 cavalry, and 100 ships, reinforced by the fleet of Euphemius and, after the landing at Mazara del Vallo, by knights. The first battle against Byzantine troops occurred on July 15, 827, near Mazara, resulting in an Aghlabid victory.

Asad subsequently conquered the southern shore of the island and laid siege to Syracuse. After a year of siege and an attempted mutiny, his troops were able to defeat a large army sent from Palermo backed by a Venetian fleet led by doge Giustiniano Participazio. However, the Muslims retreated to the castle of Mineo when a plague killed many of their troops and Asad himself. They later returned to the offensive but failed to conquer Castrogiovanni (the modern Enna, where Euphemius died), retreating back to Mazara. In 830, they received a strong reinforcement of 30,000 African and Spanish troops. The Spanish Muslims defeated the Byzantine commander Theodotus in July and August of that year, but a plague once again forced them to return to Mazara and then to Africa. The African Berber units sent to besiege Palermo captured it in September 831 after a year-long siege. Palermo, renamed al-Madinah, became the Muslim capital of Sicily.

==== Abu Fihr Muhammad ibn Abd-Allah ====
In February 832, Ziyadat Allah sent his cousin Abu Fihr Muhammad ibn Abd-Allah to the island and appointed him as the wāli of Sicily. He defeated the Byzantines in early 834, and in the following year his troops reached as far as Taormina. The war dragged on for several years with minor Ahglabid victories, while the Byzantines resisted in their strongholds of Castrogiovanni and Cefalù. New troops arrived in the island from the new Emir Al-Aghlab Abu Affan and occupied Platani, Caltabellotta, Corleone, Marineo, and Geraci, granting the Muslims total control of western Sicily.

In 836, Muslim ships helped their ally, Andrew II of Naples, when he was besieged by Beneventan troops, and with Neapolitan support Messina was also conquered in 842 by Muhammad Abul Abbas of Sicily, who later established the Emirate of Bari. In 845, Modica also fell, and the Byzantines suffered a crushing defeat near Butera, losing about 10,000 men. Lentini was conquered in 846, and Ragusa followed in 848.

==== Abbas ibn Fadhl ====
In 851, the governor and general Al-Aghlab Abu Ibrahim died. He was succeeded by Abbas ibn Fadhl. He started a campaign of ravages against the lands still in Byzantine hands, capturing Butera, Gagliano, Cefalù, and, most important of all, Castrogiovanni, in winter 859. Many of the captives from Castrogiovanni were sent to the Caliph Al-Mutawakkil, as a representation of Abbas ibn Fadhl's victory. In response, the Byzantine emperor sent a large force in 859–860 under Constantine Kontomytes, but the army and the fleet carrying it were defeated by Abbas. Byzantine reinforcements led many of the cities subjugated by the Muslims to revolt, and Abbas devoted the years 860–861 to reduce them. Abbas died in 861, replaced by his uncle Ahmed ibn Yaqub and, from February 862, by Abdallah, son of Abbas; the latter was in turn replaced by the Aghlabids with Khafagia ibn Sofian, who captured Noto, Scicli, and Troina.

==== Jafar ibn Muhammad ====
In the summer of 868, the Byzantines were defeated for the first time near Syracuse. Hostilities resumed in the early summer of 877 by the new sultan, Jafar ibn Muhammad al-Tamini, who besieged Syracuse; the city fell on May 21, 878. The Byzantines now maintained control over a short stretch of coast around Taormina, while the Muslim fleet attacked Greece and Malta. The latter fleet was, however, destroyed in a naval battle in 880. For a while, it seemed that the Byzantines could regain Sicily, but new land victories for the Muslims re-established their control. A revolt in Palermo against Governor Seuàda ibn Muhammad was crushed in 887.

The death of the strong Emperor Basil I in 886 also encouraged the Muslims to attack Calabria, where the imperial army was defeated in the summer of 888. However, the first inner revolt was followed by another in 890, mostly spurred by the hostility between Arabs and Berbers. In 892 an emir was sent from Ifriqiya by Ibrahim II ibn Ahmad to Palermo but was ousted again a few months later. The prince did not relent and sent another powerful army to Sicily under his son, Abu l-Abbas Abdallah, in 900. The Sicilians were defeated at Trapani (August 22) and outside Palermo (September 8), the latter city resisting for another ten days. Abu l-Abbas moved against the remaining Byzantine strongholds and was also able to capture Reggio Calabria on the mainland on June 10, 901.

As Ibrahim was forced to abdicate in Tunis, he decided to lead in person the operations in southern Italy. Taormina, the last main Byzantine stronghold in Sicily, fell on August 1, 902. Messina and other cities opened their gates to avoid a similar massacre. Ibrahim's army also marched on southern Calabria, besieging Cosenza. Ibrahim died of dysentery on October 24. His grandson stopped the military campaign and returned to Sicily.

=== Aghlabid Sicily (827–909) ===
At this point (902), Sicily was almost entirely under the control of the Aghlabids with the exception of some minor strongholds in the rugged interior. The population had been somewhat increased by Muslim migrants from Iberia, North Africa, and the Middle East. The emir in Palermo nominated the governors of the main cities (qadi) and those of the less important ones (hakim), along with the other functionaries. Each city had a council called a gema, composed of the most eminent members of the local society, which was entrusted with the care of the public works and of the social order. The conquered Sicilian population lived as dhimmi or converted to Islam.

The Arabs initiated land reforms that increased productivity and encouraged the growth of smallholdings, a mere dent in the dominance of the landed estates. The Arabs further improved irrigation systems. With about 300,000 inhabitants, Palermo in the 10th century was the most populous city in Italy. A description of the city was given by Ibn Hawqal, a Baghdad merchant who visited Sicily in 950. A walled suburb called the Kasr (the citadel) was (and remains) the center of Palermo, and the great Friday mosque stood on the site of the later Roman cathedral. The suburb of Al-Khalisa (Kalsa) contained the sultan's palace, baths, a mosque, government offices, and a private prison. Ibn Hawqal reckoned there were 7,000 individual butchers trading in 150 shops.

=== Fatimid Sicily (909–965) ===
In 909, the African Aghlabid dynasty was replaced by the Fatimid Caliphate, an Ismaili Shi'i dynasty. Three years later, the Fatimid governor was ousted from Palermo when the island declared its independence under Emir Ibn Qurhub. His failed siege of Taormina, which had been rebuilt by the Christians, weakened his influence. By 917, a Fatimid fleet, brought by pleas from a dissatisfied Sicilian faction, placed Palermo under siege. After a six-month siege, Ibn Qurhub and his son were captured and executed.

The island was governed by a Fatimid emir for the following 20 years. In 937, the Berbers of Agrigento revolted again but after two resounding successes were decisively beaten at the gates of Palermo. An army was then sent by the new Fatimid caliph, al-Qa'im bi-Amr Allah, to besiege Agrigento twice until it fell on November 20, 940. The revolt was totally suppressed in 941 with many of the prisoners sold as slaves and Governor Khalil boasting to have killed 600,000 people in his campaigns.

=== Independent emirate of Sicily (965–1091) ===
Southern Italy c. 1000, showing the Kalbid emirate before its collapse

After suppressing another revolt in 948, the Fatimid Caliph Ismail al-Mansur named al-Hasan ibn Ali al-Kalbi as emir of the island. As his position soon became hereditary, his emirate became de facto independent from the African government. In 950, Hassan waged war against the Byzantines in southern Italy, reaching up to Gerace and Cassano allo Ionio. A second Calabrian campaign in 952 resulted in the defeat of the Byzantine army; Gerace was again besieged, but in the end Emperor Constantine VII was forced to accept having the Calabrian cities pay a tribute to Sicily.

In 956, the Byzantines reconquered Reggio and invaded Sicily; a truce was signed in 960. Two years later a revolt in Taormina was bloodily suppressed, but the resistance of the Christians in the Siege of Rometta led the new emperor Nikephoros II Phokas to send an army of 40,000 Armenians, Thracians, and Slavs under his nephew Manuel, who captured Messina in October 964. The Byzantine forces, however, were swiftly routed in Rometta and at the Battle of the Straits, and the city soon fell to the Muslims, completing the Islamic conquest of Sicily. Manuel, along with 10,000 of his men, was killed in the fray.

The new emir Abu'l-Qasim Ali ibn al-Hasan al-Kalbi (964–982) launched a series of attacks against Calabria in the 970s, while the fleet under his brother attacked the Adriatic coasts of Apulia, capturing some strongholds. As the Byzantines were busy against the Fatimids in Syria and with the partial conquest of the Bulgarian Empire, the German Emperor Otto II decided to intervene. The allied German-Lombard army was defeated in 982 at the Battle of Stilo. However, as al-Qasim himself had been killed, his son Jabir al-Kalbi prudently retreated to Sicily without exploiting the victory. In 1005, a Christian fleet coming from Pisa sacked the Arab held Reggio Calabria and massacred all the Saracens to the great jubilation of the local population. In 1006 a new Saracen fleet was defeated near Reggio Calabria by the Pisans.

The emirate reached its cultural peak under the emirs Ja'far (983–985) and Yusuf al-Kalbi (990–998), both patrons of the arts. The latter's son Ja'far was instead a cruel and violent lord who expelled the Berbers from the island after an unsuccessful revolt against him. In 1019, another uprising in Palermo was successful, and Ja'far was exiled to Africa and replaced by his brother al-Akhal (1019–1037).

Southern Italy in 1084, showing the remains of the Kalbid emirate, then fought over by multiple claimants, on the eve of the final Norman conquest

With the support of the Fatimids, al-Akhal defeated two Byzantine expeditions in 1026 and 1031. His attempt to raise a heavy tax to pay his mercenaries caused a civil war. Al-Akhal asked the Byzantines for support while his brother abu-Hafs, leader of the rebels, received troops from the Zirid Emir of Ifriqiya, al-Muizz ibn Badis, which were commanded by his son Abdallah.

The local population conquered by the Muslims were Greek speaking Byzantine Christians, but there were also a significant number of Jews. These conquered people were afforded a limited freedom of religion under the Muslims as dhimmi, protected peoples, but were subject to some legal restrictions. The dhimmi were also required to pay the jizya, or poll tax, and the kharaj or land tax, but were exempt from the tax that Muslims had to pay (Zakaat). Under Arab rule there were different categories of Jizya payers, but their common denominator was the payment of the Jizya as a mark of subjection to Muslim rule in exchange for protection against foreign and internal aggression. The conquered population could avoid this subservient status simply by converting to Islam. Whether by honest religious conviction or societal compulsion large numbers of native Sicilians converted to Islam. However, even after 100 years of Islamic rule, numerous Greek speaking Christian communities prospered, especially in north-eastern Sicily, as dhimmi. This was largely a result of the Jizya system which allowed subservient co-existence. This co-existence with the conquered population fell apart after the reconquest of Sicily, particularly following the death of King William II of Sicily in 1189.

=== Decline (1037–1061) and Norman conquest of Sicily (1061–1091) ===
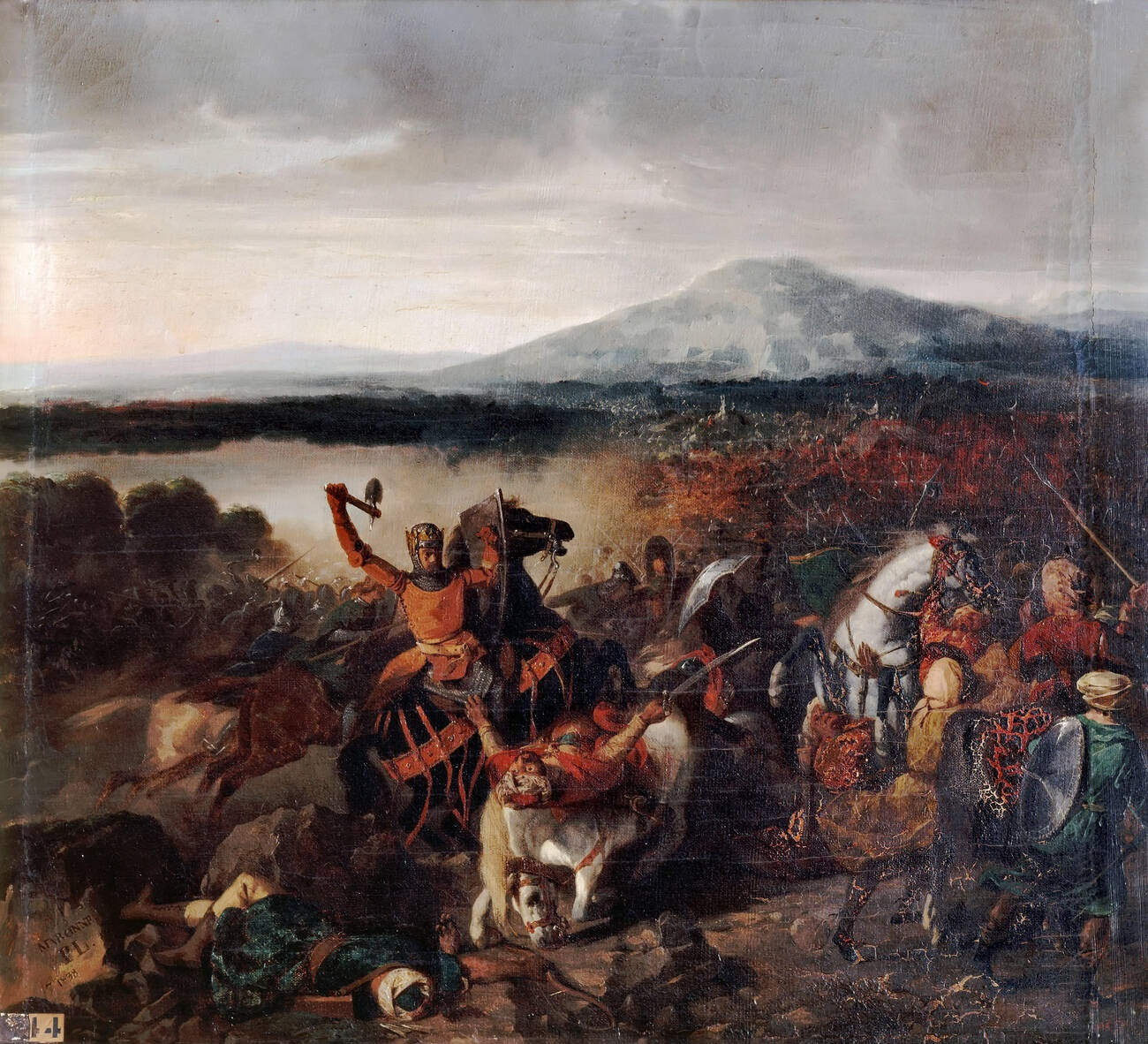
Roger I of Sicily at the 1063 Battle of Cerami, where he was victorious over 35,000 Saracens according to Goffredo Malaterra.

In 1038, a Byzantine army under George Maniaces crossed the strait of Messina. This included a corps of Normans which saved the situation in the first clash against the Muslims from Messina. After another decisive victory in the summer of 1040, Maniaces halted his march to lay siege to Syracuse. Despite his conquest of the latter, Maniaces was removed from his position, and the subsequent Muslim counter-offensive reconquered all the cities captured by the Byzantines. Many Anglo-Danish and Varangian mercenaries fought in Southern Italy, including Harald Hardrada and William de Hauteville who conquered parts of Sicily between 1038 and 1040, and Edgar the Ætheling who fought in the Norman conquest of southern Italy. Runestones were raised in Sweden in memory of warriors who died in Langbarðaland (Land of the Lombards), the Old Norse name for southern Italy.

The Norman Robert Guiscard, son of Tancred, invaded Sicily in 1060. The island was split between three Arab emirs, and the Sicilian population rose up against the ruling Muslims. One year later, Messina fell, and in 1072, Palermo was taken by the Normans. The loss of the cities, each with a splendid harbor, dealt a severe blow to Muslim power on the island. Eventually all of Sicily was taken. In 1091, Noto in the southern tip of Sicily and the island of Malta, the last Arab strongholds, fell to the Christians. By the 11th century, Muslim power in the Mediterranean had begun to wane. Several Anglo-Danish and Norwegian nobles participated in the Norman conquest of southern Italy, like Edgar the Ætheling, who left England in 1086, and Jarl Erling Skakke, who won his nickname ("Skakke", meaning bent head) after a battle against Arabs in Sicily.

=== Swabian rule (1194–1250) ===
After the Norman conquest, many Muslims decided to leave Sicily and to go into exile like the famous poets Abu Al Hasan Al Balnubi and Ibn Hamdis who also wrote poetry regarding their exile. Nevertheless, some Muslims remained in the island, but they lived confined in an inner territory of western Sicily, in the area ranging from Palermo to Agrigento. The existence of Muslims was constant issue during Hohenstaufen rule in Sicily under Henry VI and his son Frederick II. Many oppressive measures were introduced by Frederick to please the popes who were afraid of Muslims so close to the papal state. This resulted in a rebellion by Sicilian Muslims, which in turn triggered organized resistance and systematic reprisals which marked the final chapter of Islam in Sicily. Under Frederick's reign, Moors were progressively eradicated until the massive deportation of the last Muslims of Sicily. Historians have calculated that the number of expelled Muslims from Sicily was around 60,000, which means almost all of the Muslim population of the island. Most went to North Africa, while others were initially deported to a series of cities on mainland Italy: Lucera, Girifalco, Acerenza, Stornara, Casal Monte Saraceno and Castel Saraceno. From 1224 to 1239 some of these Muslims tried to return in Sicily, but in 1239 Frederick decided to deport all of them to Lucera. The annihilation of Islam in Sicily was completed by the late 1240s when the final deportations to Lucera took place.

=== Deportation of the last Muslims from Lucera (1300) ===
Some of the expelled Muslims were removed to Lucera (Lugêrah, as it was known in Arabic). Their numbers eventually reached between 15,000 and 20,000, leading Lucera to be called Lucaera Saracenorum. The colony thrived for 75 years until it was sacked in 1300 by Christian forces under the command of the Angevin Charles II of Naples. The city's Muslim inhabitants were exiled or sold into slavery, with many finding asylum in Albania across the Adriatic Sea. After the expulsions of Muslims in Lucera, Charles II replaced Lucera's Saracens with Christians, chiefly Burgundian and Provençal soldiers and farmers, following an initial settlement of 140 Provençal families in 1273. A remnant of the descendants of these Provençal colonists, still speaking a Franco-Provençal dialect, has survived till the present day in the villages of Faeto and Celle di San Vito.

=== During Aragonese rule (1412–1516) ===
During Sicily's time in the composite monarchy of the Crown of Aragon, the Spanish Inquisition arrived on the Mediterranean island. During this time, one Muslim was executed, "renegade" convert Olivieri de Mauro, who was burned in an auto-da-fé on August 11, 1506. He was the only person executed by the inquisition in Sicily under Ferdinand II.

=== During Spanish rule (1516–1713) ===
During Spanish rule of Sicily, and to escape the Spanish inquisition of the Moriscos (Muslims who had converted to Christianity) in the Iberian peninsula, a few Moriscos migrated to Sicily. During this time there were several attempts to rid Sicily of its extensive formerly Muslim 'Moor' population. The attacks were also directed against crypto-Muslim slaves and Sicilian renegades who refused to deny Islam during the 16th and the 17th centuries. However, it is doubtful that the order was carried out in practice. The main reason that some former Muslims were able to remain in Sicily was that they were openly supported by The Duke of Osuna, now officially installed as viceroy in Palermo, advocated to the Spanish monarch in Madrid for allowing the Moriscos to stay in Sicily.

== Italian Peninsula ==
Even as the conquest of Sicily was ongoing, the Aghlabids began campaigning on the Italian mainland. Their invasions of Calabria and Apulia, as well as their attacks on other central Mediterranean islands, were probably undertaken as an extension of their conquest of Sicily, aiming to aid the latter by attacking other Byzantine positions in the region. The first major expeditions to the peninsula took place between 835 and 843. Amantea was taken in 839 or 846 and occupied until 886, when the Byzantines retook it. Taranto was captured in 840 and occupied until 880. Bari was captured by Muslims either in 840 or 847. Rome was raided by a Muslim force in 846, although it is not certain that the raiders came from Aghlabid territory. Another attack towards Rome took place in 849, leading to a great naval battle near Ostia during which a fleet of Muslim ships was destroyed, marking a halt to Muslim advances on the peninsula.

Many of the Muslim forces that operated on the peninsula or occupied some of its cities seem to have had only tenuous allegiances to the Aghlabid dynasty. Some Muslim mercenaries even entered into the service of Naples or local Lombard rulers at various times. The early Muslim occupiers of Bari, for example, appear to have served as mercenaries of Radelchis I of Benevento. The Emirate of Bari, which existed from 847 to 871, had its own rulers whose relations to the Aghlabids are not clearly known.

=== Emirate of Bari (847–871) ===
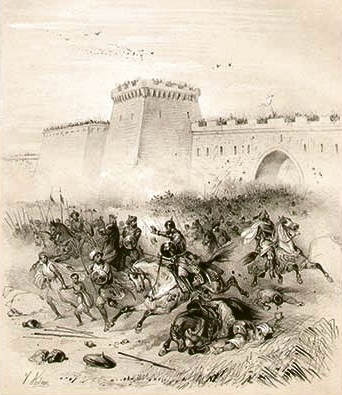
The capture of Bari led by the Emperor Louis II in 871

The Adriatic port city of Bari, in the Apulia region of southern Italy, was captured by a Muslim army in 847, then remained under Muslim control for the next 25 years. It became the capital of a small, independent Islamic state with an emir and a mosque of its own. The first ruler of Bari was Khalfun, who had probably come from Sicily. After his death in 852, he was succeeded by Mufarraq ibn Sallam, who strengthened the Muslim conquest and enlarged its boundaries. He also asked for official recognition from Baghdad Caliph al-Mutawakkil's governor in Egypt as wāli (i.e., prefect ruling over a province of the Abbasid empire). The third, and last, emir of Bari was Sawdan, who came to power around 857 after the murder of Mufarraq. He invaded the lands of the Lombard Duchy of Benevento, forcing duke Adelchis to pay a tribute. In 864, he obtained the official investiture requested by Mufarrag. The town was embellished with architecture including a mosque, palaces and public works.

In 866, the Emperor Louis organised a response. After a five-year campaign, he fought his way deep into Apulia and Calabria but bypassing major population centres like Bari or Taranto. A few towns were freed of Muslim control and the various Muslim bands encountered were universally defeated. Encouraged by these successes, Louis attacked Bari with a ground force of Franks and Lombards and aided by a Croatian fleet. In February 871, the citadel fell and Sawdan was captured and taken to Benevento in chains. In 1002 a last attempt of Saracen conquest was stopped, when a Venetian fleet defeated the Muslims besieging Bari.

=== Emirate of Taranto (840–880) ===
The Emirate of Taranto is the name given to an approximate Muslim settlement built starting from 840 by warriors from the recently conquered Sicily (827) who would have been under the command of a certain Saba, not better identified but remembered by Venetian chronicle of John the Deacon. What was initially an entrenched camp of Muslim warriors from Sicily was consolidated in 846, to resist as a settlement in Saracen hands until 880. The Venetians, to defend their role as a commercial port of Byzantium (whose traffic had been threatened by a destructive Saracen raid on Brindisi in 838), already intervened in the spring of 841, probably on behalf of the Byzantines, moving against Taranto with a fleet of sixty ships, but were defeated in the Ionian Sea and pursued as far as Istria, where the Muslims sacked the island of Cres, also setting fire to Ancona and attempting an incursion from the mouth of the Po. In the canal of Otranto they then destroyed other Venetian ships coming from Sicily. The following year the Saracens of Taranto pushed again as far as Kvarner Gulf, defeating a Venetian fleet that had arrived there to face them. These victories strengthened the base of Taranto, at least in this time not an independent state, much less an "Emirate", but a foothold from which to start raids in the Adriatic and in the surrounding cities, initially at the service of the rebel Siconulf, prince of Salerno. Thus not only Saracens from Sicily arrived in Taranto, but also African Berber and Andalusian corsairs exiled to Crete, attracted by the prospects of easy booty.

The last presumed emir of Taranto, a certain ʿUthmān, allegedly negotiated in 875 or 876 with Adelchi, Duke of Benevento, the liberation of Sawdān, the terrible emir of Bari, prisoner for 4–5 years in Benevento and that he would then take refuge again in Taranto, perhaps having already been its commander before ʿUthmān.

The end of the Islamic presence in the Apulian city occurred in 880, by the Byzantine forces and the commander Leo Apostyppes. Under the energetic leadership of Basil I the Macedonian, between 876 and 880 a huge fleet commanded by the Syrian Nasar and two armies led by Procopius and Leo were set up. The first result obtained by these was the occupation of Taranto in 880, and the enslavement of its Arab-Berber population, while the town was occupied by a Greek garrison.

=== Latium and Campania ===
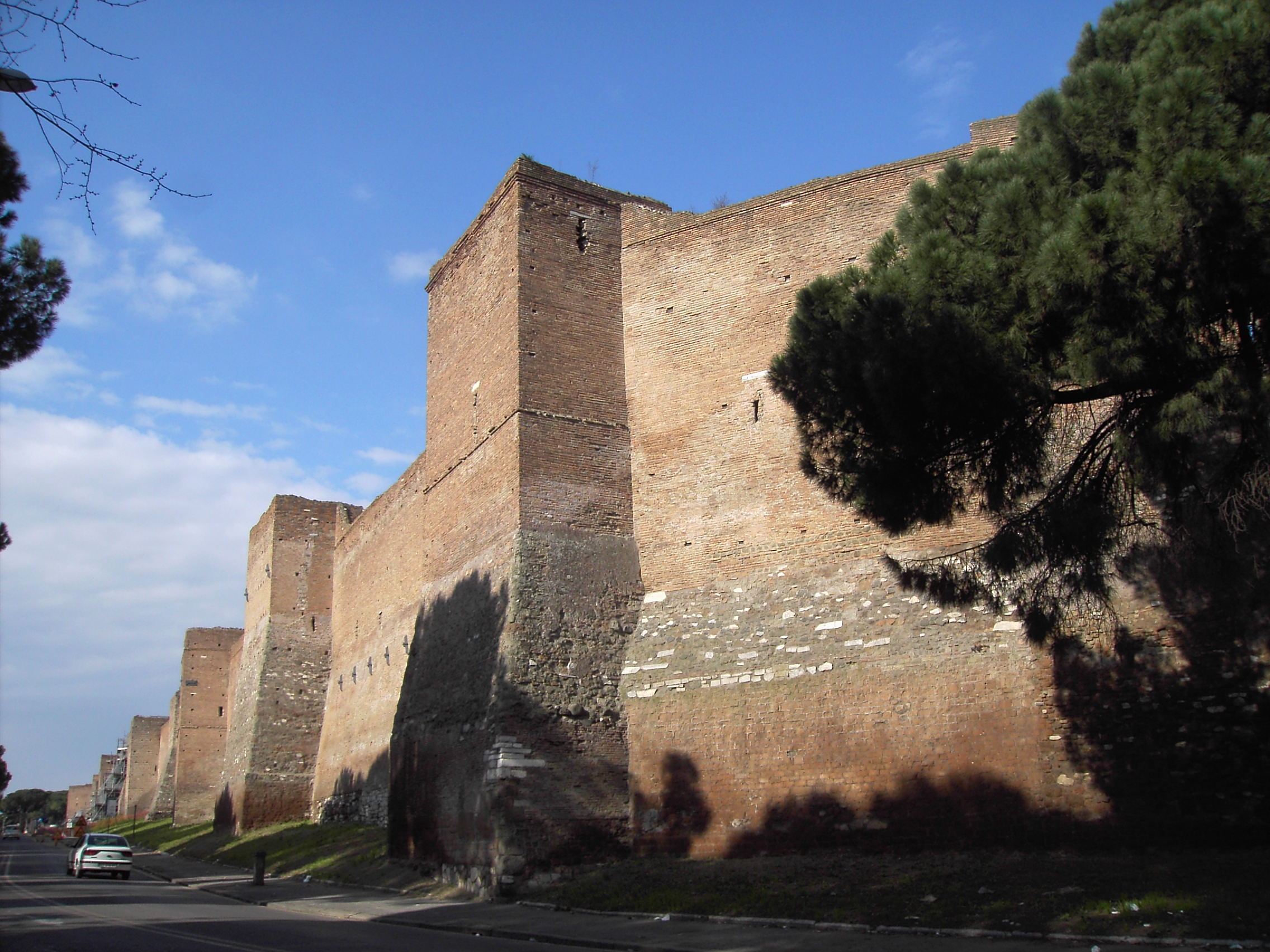
The Aurelian Walls halted the Arab raid against Rome in 846

Throughout the ninth century, Arab ships dominated the Tyrrhenian Sea. Their pirates prowled the Italian coast launching hit and run attacks against the cities of Amalfi, Gaeta, Naples, and Salerno. During this period, as the cities took command of their own defences, the Duchies of Gaeta and Amalfi gained their independence from the Duchy of Naples. The Christian states of the Campania were not yet prepared, however, to ally against the new Saracen threat. Amalfi and Gaeta regularly teamed up with the Saracens and Naples was hardly better, all much to the chagrin of the Papacy. In fact, it was Naples that first brought Saracen troops to the south Italian mainland when Duke Andrew II hired them as mercenaries during his war with Sicard, Prince of Benevento, in 836. Sicard immediately responded with his own Saracen mercenaries and their usage soon became the norm.

In 846 the Duchy of Naples, in alliance with maritime powers of Gaeta, Amalfi and Sorrento, defeated a Saracen fleet near Licosa. Before the battle, the alliance had already recaptured Ponza which had fallen into the possession of the Saracens earlier that year. In response, a large Saracen force landed at Porto and Ostia in 846, annihilating the local Christian garrison. The Arabs struck following the Tiber and the Ostiense and Portuense roads, as the Roman militia hastily retreated to the safety of the Roman walls. At the same time, other Arab forces landed at Centumcellae, marching towards Rome. No contemporary account hints at any Saracen attempt to penetrate the city, but it is possible that the Romans defended the Aurelian Walls, while outside of the city, around St. Peter's Basilica, members of the Vatican scholae (Saxons, Lombards, Frisians and Franks) attempted to resist, but were defeated. In the meantime, an army coming from Spoleto and headed by Lombard Duke Guy, attacked the Arabs, hindered by booty and prisoners, in front of the city walls, pursuing a part of them until Centumcellae, while another group tried to reach Miseno by land. The Saracens were able to embark, but a storm destroyed many ships, bringing on the beaches many corpses adorned with jewels which could be recovered. After that, the Lombard army headed south, reaching the Arabs at Gaeta, where another battle was engaged. On that occasion, only the arrival of Caesar of Naples, son of Sergius, Magister Militum of Naples, decided the battle in favour of the Christians.

Three years later, the same coalition of maritime powers, led by Caesar of Naples and supported by the Papal States, defeated another Arabic fleet near the recently refortified Ostia. The Saracen survivors were made prisoners, enslaved and sent to work in chain gangs building the Leonine Wall which was to encompass the Vatican Hill. Rome would never again be threatened by an Arab army. After the Christian conquest of Bari, an Aghlabid force landed in Calabria and besieged Salerno, but the Emperor Louis forced the raising of the siege. In 877, Pope John VIII, who encouraged a vigorous policy against the Muslim pirates and raiders, led an alliance of Capua, Salerno and Gaeta and defeated a Muslim fleet near Mount Circeo, capturing 18 enemy vessels and freeing 600 Christian slaves. In 880 or 881, John rescinded his grant of Traetto to Docibilis I of Gaeta and gave it instead to Pandenulf of Capua. As Patricia Skinner relates:

[Pandenolf] began to attack Gaeta's territory, and in retaliation against the pope Docibilis unleashed a group of Arabs from Agropoli near Salerno on the area around Fondi. The pope was "filled with shame" and restored Traetto to Docibilis. Their agreement seems to have sparked off a Saracen attack on Gaeta itself, in which many Gaetans were killed or captured. Eventually peace was restored and the Saracens made a permanent settlement on the mouth of the Garigliano river.

In 898 the Abbey of Farfa was sacked by "Saracens", who burned it to the ground. Abbot Peter of Farfa managed to organise the community's escape and salvaged its library and archives. In 905, the monastery was again attacked and destroyed by "Saracens". Other areas of historical Saracen presence in central and southern Italy include, Saracinesco, Ciciliano and Nocera Inferiore.

The Saracen fortress at Minturno (in modern-day Lazio) by the Garigliano River became a perennial thorn in the side for the Papacy and many expeditions sought to get rid of them. In 915, Pope John X organised a vast alliance of southern powers, including Gaeta and Naples, the Lombard princes and the Byzantines; 'though, the Amalfitans stood aloof. The subsequent Battle of the Garigliano was successful, and all Saracens were captured and executed, ending any presence of Arabs in Lazio or Campania permanently. In 999 a last Saracen attempt of conquest of Salerno was thwarted by an alliance of Lombards, led by Prince Guaimar III, and a band of Norman pilgrims returning from Jerusalem.

=== Ottoman invasion of Otranto ===
In 1480, an Ottoman Turkish fleet invaded Otranto, landing nearby the city and capturing it along with its fort. The Otranto population (remaining in the occupied city) was massacred after refusing to convert to Islam.

The Ottoman ambitions in Italy were ended. Had Otranto surrendered to the Turks, the history of Italy might have been very different. But the heroism of the people of Otranto was more than a strategically decisive stand. What made the sacrifice of Otranto so remarkable was the willingness to die for the faith rather than reject Christ.

Pope Sixtus IV called for a crusade, and a massive force was built up by Ferdinand I of Naples, among them notably troops of Hungarian king Matthias Corvinus, despite frequent Italian quarreling at the time. The Neapolitan force met with the Turks in 1481, thoroughly annihilating them and recapturing Otranto.

In 1537, the famous Turkish corsair and Ottoman admiral Barbarossa tried again to conquer Otranto and the Fortress of Castro, but the Turks were eventually repulsed from the city.

Ottoman incursions on the south and west coasts of Italy continued into the 17th century. Pozzuoli and Castellamare in the Bay of Naples were attacked in 1548; Ischia in 1544; Reggio in Calabria in 1594 (cathedral destroyed); and Vieste, Vasto and Manfredonia were raided and sacked in 1554, 1560, and 1620 respectively.

== Sardinia ==
Starting from 705 to 706, the Saracens from the recently conquered North Africa would harass the Sardinians from the coastal towns. Details about the island's political situation in the following centuries are scarce. Because of the Saracen attacks in the 9th century, Tharros was abandoned in favor of Oristano after more than 1,800 years of habitation; Caralis, Porto Torres and numerous other coastal centres suffered the same fate. In 805, the imperial patrician of Sicily Constantine signed a ten-year truce with Ibrahim ibn al-Aghlab, emir of Ifriqiya, but this was not an impediment to the other pirates from North Africa and Muslim Spain to attack repeatedly Sardinia between 806 and 821.

In 1015 and again in 1016 the Emir Mujāhid al-‘Āmirī of Denya (Latinized as Museto) from the taifa of Denia, in the east of Muslim Spain (al-Andalus), attacked Sardinia and attempted to establish political control over it. The twelfth-century Pisan Liber maiolichinus, a history of the 1113–1115 Balearic Islands expedition, records that Mujāhid had managed to take military control of the Sardinian coastal plain; the local Sardinian ruler and judge of Cagliari, Salusius, was in fact killed in the fighting and the Sardinian organised resistance broke down. However, over the course of those very years some joint expeditions from the Italian maritime republics of Pisa and Genoa managed to repulse the invaders and thus preserved Sardinia as a part of Christendom: these Pisan–Genoese expeditions to Sardinia were approved and supported by the Papacy, making them precursors of the Crusades, which began eighty years later. In 1022, some new invasion attempts were made by the Saracens, but a joint alliance between Pisa, Genoa and the Sardinian Judicates was able to prevent them from effectively doing so in 1052. Although the Arab attacks failed to achieve the island's conquest, they caused nonetheless a significant weakening of Sardinia's actual independence, leading to a struggle of the Italian powers for political influence over the island's independent states, with the sole exception of Arborea.

== Islamic and Arabic influence and legacy ==
Only in Sicily can be found some Islamic and Arabic influence and legacy, mainly in the western half of the island. In the other regions of southern Italy there it is nothing, like in the Messina province in northeastern Sicily.

Indeed, Arabic art and science continued to be influential in urban Sicily during the two centuries following the Christian reconquest. Frederick II, Holy Roman Emperor and King of Sicily in the early 13th century, is said to have been able to speak Arabic (as well as Latin, Sicilian, German, French, and Greek) and had several Muslim ministers.

The heritage of the Arabic language can still be found in numerous terms adapted from it and still used in the Sicilian dialect. Another legacy of Muslim rule is the survival of some Sicilian toponyms of Arabic origin, for example "Calata-" or "Calta-" from Arabic qalʿat (قلعة) "fortress or citadel". Indeed, the city of Caltanisetta gets its name from the Saracen name قلعة النساء Qal‘at al-Nisā’ ('Fort of the Women').

== Genetics ==
Monnereau et al. (2024) analyzed burials at the site of Segesta to investigate the interactions between Muslim and Christian communities during the Middle Ages in Sicily. The biomolecular and Isotopic results suggest the Christians remained genetically distinct from the Muslim community at Segesta while following a substantially similar diet. Based on these results, the authours suggest that the two communities at Segesta could have followed endogamy rules.

== See also ==
- History of Islam in Malta
