= 849 =

Calendar year

849 in various calendars
- Gregorian calendar: 849; DCCCXLIX
- Ab urbe condita: 1602
- Armenian calendar: 298; ԹՎ ՄՂԸ
- Assyrian calendar: 5599
- Balinese saka calendar: 770–771
- Bengali calendar: 255–256
- Berber calendar: 1799
- Buddhist calendar: 1393
- Burmese calendar: 211
- Byzantine calendar: 6357–6358
- Chinese calendar: 戊辰年 (Earth Dragon); 3546 or 3339 — to — 己巳年 (Earth Snake); 3547 or 3340
- Coptic calendar: 565–566
- Discordian calendar: 2015
- Ethiopian calendar: 841–842
- Hebrew calendar: 4609–4610
- Hindu calendars
- Vikram Samvat: 905–906
- Shaka Samvat: 770–771
- Kali Yuga: 3949–3950
- Holocene calendar: 10849
- Iranian calendar: 227–228
- Islamic calendar: 234–235
- Japanese calendar: Kashō 2 (嘉祥２年)
- Javanese calendar: 746–747
- Julian calendar: 849; DCCCXLIX
- Korean calendar: 3182
- Minguo calendar: 1063 before ROC 民前1063年
- Nanakshahi calendar: −619
- Seleucid era: 1160/1161 AG
- Thai solar calendar: 1391–1392
- Tibetan calendar: ས་ཕོ་འབྲུག་ལོ་ (male Earth-Dragon); 975 or 594 or −178 — to — ས་མོ་སྦྲུལ་ལོ་ (female Earth-Snake); 976 or 595 or −177

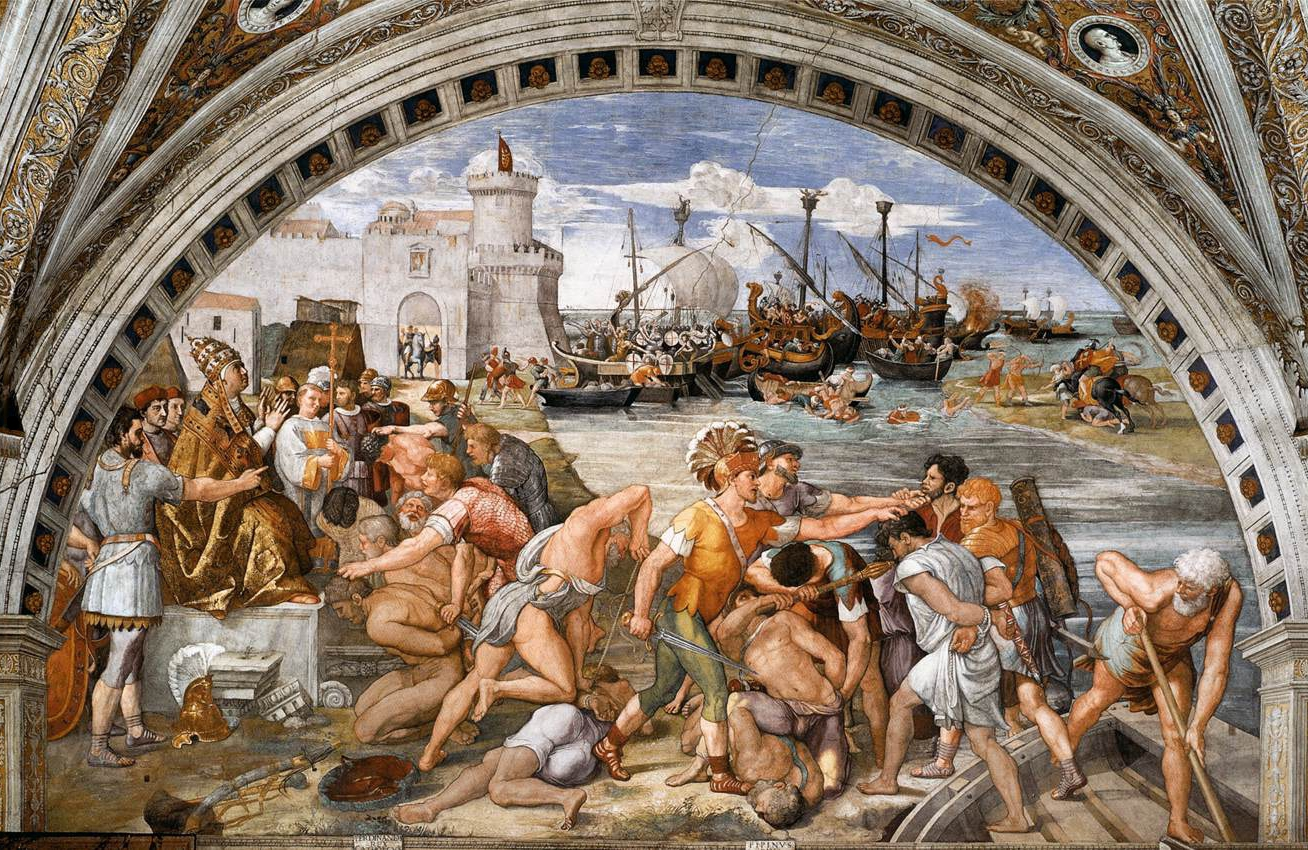
The Battle of Ostia at the Vatican Museum

Year 849 (DCCCXLIX) was a common year starting on Tuesday of the Julian calendar.

== Events ==
=== By place ===
==== Europe ====
- Summer – Battle of Ostia: A Saracen Arab fleet from Sardinia sets sail towards Rome. In response, Pope Leo IV forms a coalition of maritime Italian cities, including Naples, Amalfi and Gaeta, led by Admiral Caesar — which is assembled off the re-fortified port of Ostia — and repels the Saracen marauders. Their navy is scattered, resulting in many sunken vessels. Rome is saved from plunder and the expansion of the Aghlabids.
- Frankish forces under King Charles the Bald invade southern France, and conquer the territory of Toulouse. He appoints Fredelo as count (comté) of Toulouse, who founds the Rouergue dynasty. Aquitaine is submitted to the West Frankish Kingdom.

==== Abbasid Caliphate ====
- The Armenian prince Bagrat II begins a rebellion against Caliph Al-Mutawakkil, of the Abbasid Caliphate.

==== Asia ====
- In the Chinese capital city of Chang'an, an imperial prince is impeached during the Tang Dynasty from his position by officials at court, for erecting a building that obstructs a street in the northwesternmost ward in South Central Chang'an.
- King Pyinbya of Burma founds the city of Bagan, located in the Mandalay Region, and fortifies it with walls.

== Births ==
- May – Isma'il ibn Ahmad, Muslim emir (d. 907)
- Alfred the Great, king of Wessex (d. 899)
- Eric Anundsson, king of Sweden (d. 882)

== Deaths ==
- January 15 – Theophylact, Byzantine co-emperor (b. c.793)
- Ali ibn Muhammad, Idrisid emir of Morocco
- c. February – Harthamah ibn al-Nadr al-Jabali, Muslim governor
- June – Ali ibn al-Madini, Muslim scholar (b. 778)
- c. June? – Ragenar, bishop of Amiens
- December 17 – John IV ("the Peacemaker"), bishop of Naples
- August 18 – Walafrid Strabo, Frankish theological writer
- Conaing mac Flainn, king of Brega (Ireland)
- Connagan, bishop of Clonfert (Ireland)
- Guntbold, archbishop of Rouen
- Itakh (Ītākh al-Khazarī), Muslim general
- Zhang Zhongwu, Chinese general
