= Campanian League =

Early medieval anti-Islamic military coalition

Warships and sailors of the Campanian League at the battle of Ostia in a Raphael's fresco (1514-1515), Papal Rooms, Vatican City

The Campanian League (Latin: Foedus Neapolitanorum, Amalphitanorum, Surrentinorum Caietanorumque; Italian: Lega Campana) was a military alliance of the cities of Naples, Amalfi, Sorrento and Gaeta formed in 846, and supported by Pope Leo IV, to counter the Muslim raids on Tyrrhenian coasts of the Italian Peninsula during the 9th century, in the Early Middle Ages.

The coalition, mainly naval, had its greatest victories at the battles of Licosa (846) and of Ostia (849), when it saved the city of Rome from other Saracen lootings, after the raid that took place in 846.

== History ==
The league included the four so-called Tyrrhenian duchies, the Neapolitan one and the duchies of Amalfi, of Sorrento and of Gaeta, de jure under byzantine authority but de facto autonomous and ruled by local dynasties since the first part of the 9th century. During this period, South Italy was a border area between the Carolingian Empire, the Byzantine Empire and that portion of the Mediterranean basin where the early Islamic conquests took place, with the Langobardia Minor (the remaining Lombard domains) trying to maintain its independence but ready to disassemble in the Benevento, Capua and Salerno principalities.

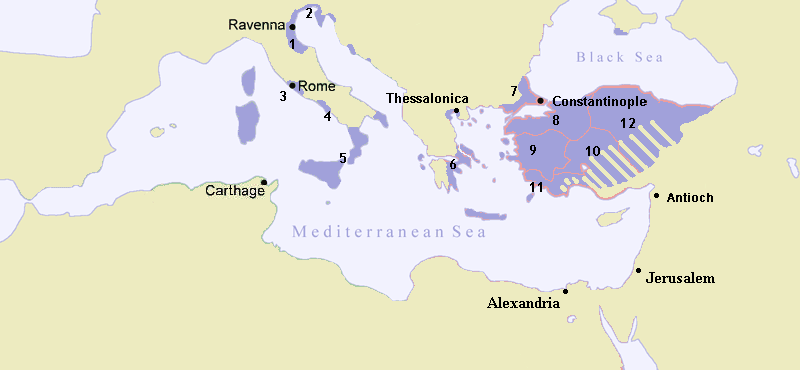
The Byzantine Empire during the 8th century

Following the start of the Islamic conquest of Byzantine Sicily (827), the Saracens began to appear with increasing frequency in the Tyrrhenian Sea, both as raiders and as mercenaries, initially recruited by Duke of Naples Andrew II to fight against Prince of Benevento Sicard.

However, the situation changed and the recruited Muslim mercenaries began to devastate the Neapolitan territories, including Miseno. So, following the Islamic sack of Ponza and Licosa, the cities of Naples, Amalfi, Sorrento and Gaeta joined forces in 846 to form the Campanian League, "a league that was the first to be established by Italian cities in opposition to foreign arrogance", according to historian Michelangelo Schipa.

The commander-in-chief of the coalition was Caesarius, son of Duke of Naples Sergius I, and in that same year (846) he defeated the Saracens at the battle of Licosa. However, in the summer of 846, Rome was also subjected to a sack by troops arriving by sea from Ifriqiya (the Islamic former Roman province of Africa). After defeating an army led by the future Carolingian emperor Louis II, these forces advanced along the Appian Way, devastated the towns of Fondi and Formia, and laid siege to Gaeta: Caesarius and the forces of the Campanian League managed to arrive in time to save the city, defeating the Muslims and causing their withdrawal.

Saracens sacking Old St. Peter's Basilica, Rome, in a Lodovico Pogliaghi's depiction

In 849, news arrived that a new Saracen fleet was approaching to Ostia, with the intention of ascending the Tiber River to strike Rome once again. Caesarius, along with the soldiers and the sailors of the Campanian League, appeared at the Lateran called by Pope Leo IV, who welcomed them and bestowed his blessing, before following them to the mouth of the Tiber River. After that, the battle of Ostia began: the fleet of the Campanian League launched an assault on the Muslim fleet, sinking a portion of it. The remaining Saracen ships were struck by a storm, leaving Caesarius and his men the sole victors of the engagement. Seven centuries later Raphael painted a fresco, called Battle of Ostia and located in Papal Rooms (Vatican City), to commemorate how this military coalition saved Rome from further devastation.

In the second half of the 9th century, the sometimes divergent interests of the cities that formed it led to the dissolution of the Campanian League, coinciding with the disappearance of the very purpose for which the alliance had been created: the relations that Naples, Amalfi and Gaeta maintained with the Muslims, especially the Aghlabids, began to take the form of peaceful commercial exchange, or even military support.

Approximately seventy years later, however, the members of the coalition fought together again to eradicate the Muslim settlement sprung up near the Garigliano River, during the battle of 915, "the most honorable national endeavour accomplished by the Italians in the 10th century", as much as the battle of Ostia "had been their greatest achievement in the 9th century", according to German historian Ferdinand Gregorovius.

Italy's Campania region and the four Tyrrhenian duchies during the first half of the 11th century

During the 12th century, the Tyrrhenian duchies became part of the Kingdom of Sicily ruled by a Norman dynasty, the Hauteville family.

== See also ==
- Battle of Licosa (846)
- Battle of Ostia
- Caesar of Naples
- Duchy of Amalfi
- Duchy of Gaeta
- Duchy of Naples
- Duchy of Sorrento
- Muslim Sicily
- Saracen
