= Duchy of Sorrento =

Principality of the Early Middle Ages centred on Sorrento, Italy

- 9th century–1078
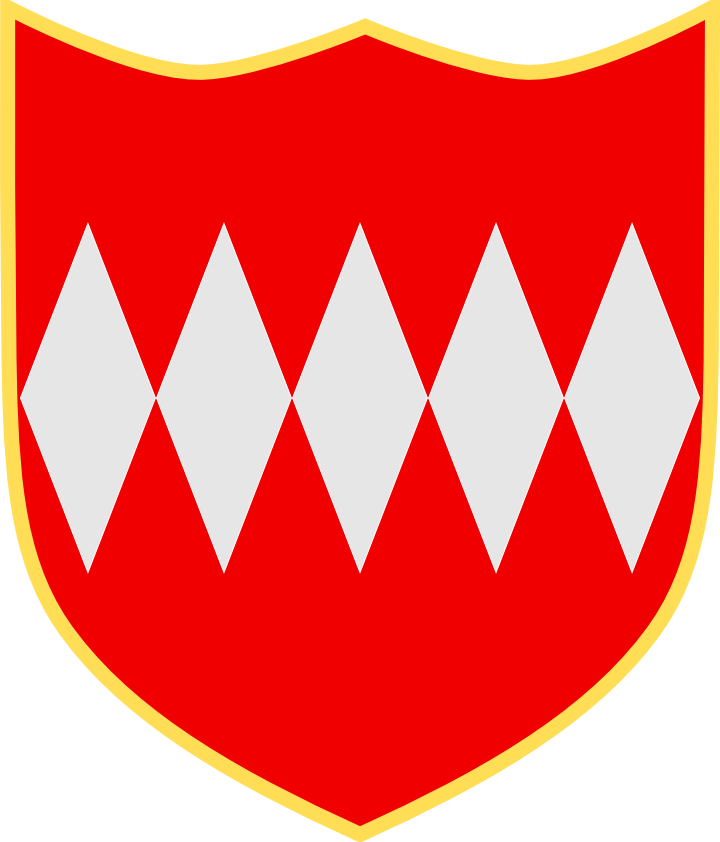
- Coat of arms

- Campania and the Duchy of Sorrento in the 9th century
- Status: Independent state
- Capital: Sorrento
- Common languages: Latin, Greek, and Neapolitan
- Religion: Roman Catholicism
- Government: Elective duchy
- Duke
- Historical era: Early Middle Ages
  - Duke elected: 9th century
  - annexed by the Normans to the Kingdom of Sicily: 1078
Preceded by	Succeeded by
Duchy of Naples	Kingdom of Sicily
- Today part of: Italy

The Duchy of Sorrento was a small peninsular duchy of the Early Middle Ages centred on the Italian city of Sorrento.. It was one of the tyrrhenian duchies along with the duchy of Naples, Amalfi and Gaeta.

Established in the 7th century as a fief of the Duchy of Naples, at the time still part of the Byzantine Empire.

In 839 it resisted, with the help of the Duchy of Naples, under siege by the Lombard prince Sicard of Benevento, who the year before had conquered the Duchy of Amalfi.

Being the smallest and the most exposed, being on a peninsula, of the Campanian duchies, often it had to ally themselves to protect themselves from the ever-growing menace of the Saracens.

In 846, the Duchy of Sorrento joined the Campanian League, promoted and established by Pope Leo IV for the defense of Rome and the Papal States against the Saracens. In the 849 summer, the Campanian League, consisting of a fleet of ships of the duchies of Amalfi, Gaeta, Naples and Sorrento, under the guidance of the consul Cesarius, son of Duke Sergius I of Naples, defeated the Saracens who were preparing to land at Ostia with the intent to carry out the invasion and destruction of Rome and the papacy. The Battle of Ostia was won by the Campanian League also with the help of a storm that completely destroyed the Saracen fleet off the coast of Ostia. The Battle of Ostia was one of the most famous in history of the Papacy of the Early Middle Ages and is celebrated in a famous fresco by Raphael, painted by his assistant Giulio Romano, in particular in the Fire in the Borgo of the Vatican Palace in the Vatican City.

Unlike Gaeta and Amalfi, it remained under formal Neapolitan suzerainty for most of its existence. It only achieved full independence in 1027, when Pandulf IV of Capua occupied Naples. This independence did not last long however, as by 1040 Guaimar IV of Salerno annexed it. He gave to its brother Guy who kept it until its death. The duchy disappeared in 1078 along with the Principality of Salerno, annexed by Robert Guiscard into the norman state, the future Kingdom of Sicily.

== See also ==
- Arab raid against Rome
- History of Islam in southern Italy
- Battle of Ostia
- Battle of Garigliano
