= Athanasius I (bishop of Naples) =

Saint Athanasius of Naples

Confessor and Bishop of Naples
- Born: 830; Naples, Duchy of Naples
- Died: 872; Veroli, Bishopric of Veroli
- Venerated in: Roman Catholic Church
- Canonized: Pre-congregation
- Major shrine: Naples Cathedral, Naples, Italy
- Feast: 15 July
- Patronage: Naples, Italy

Saint Athanasius I (c. 832 – 872) was the bishop of Naples from 850 to his death. This Athanasius should not be confused with his nephew, Athanasius II.

== Biography ==
Athanasius was the second son of Sergius I of Naples and not quite twenty years old when he became Bishop of Naples in 849, at the same time his brother, Gregory, became co-duke. He was consecrated bishop in Rome by Pope Leo IV. Athanasius led a life of austerity and prayer, and was particular concerned with the proper education and training of the clergy in his diocese. He oversaw the restoration of the monastery of the Most Holy Saviour, and established a monastery dedicated to Sts. Januarius and Agrippinus. He also established a hospice for pilgrims, and set up a process for ransoming prisoners captured by the Saracens.

He attended the Lateran Council of 863.

Athanasius was an intimate of both the court of the Western Emperor and that of the Pope. He was a familiaris of emperors Lothair I and Louis II and was made a Papal legate because of his connections with the Roman curia.

Before dying, Sergius bade Gregory to follow the counsel of his brother the bishop. Gregory did, but his son, Sergius II, did not. He persecuted Athanasius, who was opposed to the alliance with the Aghlabids of Sicily, and took possession of the treasures of the cathedral. In 870 Duke Sergius II imprisoned his uncle Caesar, admiral of the Neapolitan fleet, who similarly opposed his closeness to the Aghlabids, Caesar died in prison.

The bishop was exiled to a small island, only to be rescued by Amalfitan ships sent by the Emperor Louis. While travelling to Rome, Athanasius died at Veroli, and was buried at Monte Cassino. His body was afterwards translated to the Cathedral of Naples.

He is regarded among Roman Catholics as the co-patron saint of the city of Naples, and his feast day is 15 July. A vita of Athanasius was written by John the Deacon in 872.

== Sources ==
- Erchempert. Historia Langabardorvm Beneventarnorvm at The Latin Library.
- Dizionario Biografico degli Italiani, LIX. Mario Caravale, ed. Rome: 2002.
