= Siege of Lentini =

Aghlabid siege of Byzantine holding in Sicily

- Part of the Muslim conquest of Sicily
Date	846 or 847
Location	Lentini
Result	Aghlabid victory

Belligerents
Byzantine Empire	Aghlabids

Commanders and leaders
Unknown	Al-Fadl bin Jafar al-Hamadhani

Strength
Unknown	Unknown

Casualties and losses
Few survived	Unknown

The siege of Lentini occurred in 846 or 847 when the Arab Aghlabids attacked and captured the city of Lentini from the Byzantines.

== Siege ==
Following the defeat at the Battle of Butera, the Byzantines suffered heavy casualties. In 846 or 847, Al-Fadl ibn-Gafar the victor at Messina, attacked the important town of Lentini in the eastern part of the island, between Catania and Syracuse. The Byzantine strategos rushed to the aid of the besieged. It was agreed between him and the inhabitants of Leontini that, to signal his approach, a beacon would be lit on one of the mountains near the town. Al Fadl became aware of this and lit a fire on the mountain for three days to fool the garrison. Al Fadl then took the majority of his force to prepare an ambush while he left a few men under Lentini. On the fourth day, under the belief that strategos was very close to the city, the Byzantine garrison led a sortie. The Arabs, pretending to flee, lured them into the arranged ambush, while the city remained almost empty for defense. The Byzantines were caught and most of them were massacred except a few. The inhabitants of the city were forced to surrender in exchange for their lives and properties.

== Sources ==
- Alexander A. Vasiliev, Byzantium and the Arabs. Volume I, The Amorium dynasty (820–867).
- J. B. Bury (2008), History of the Eastern Empire from the Fall of Irene to the Accession of Basil, A. D. 802–867.
- Michele Amari (1854), Storia dei Musulmani di Sicilia, Vol I.
