= Muslim raid on Rome =

846 military incursion

Muslim raid against Rome
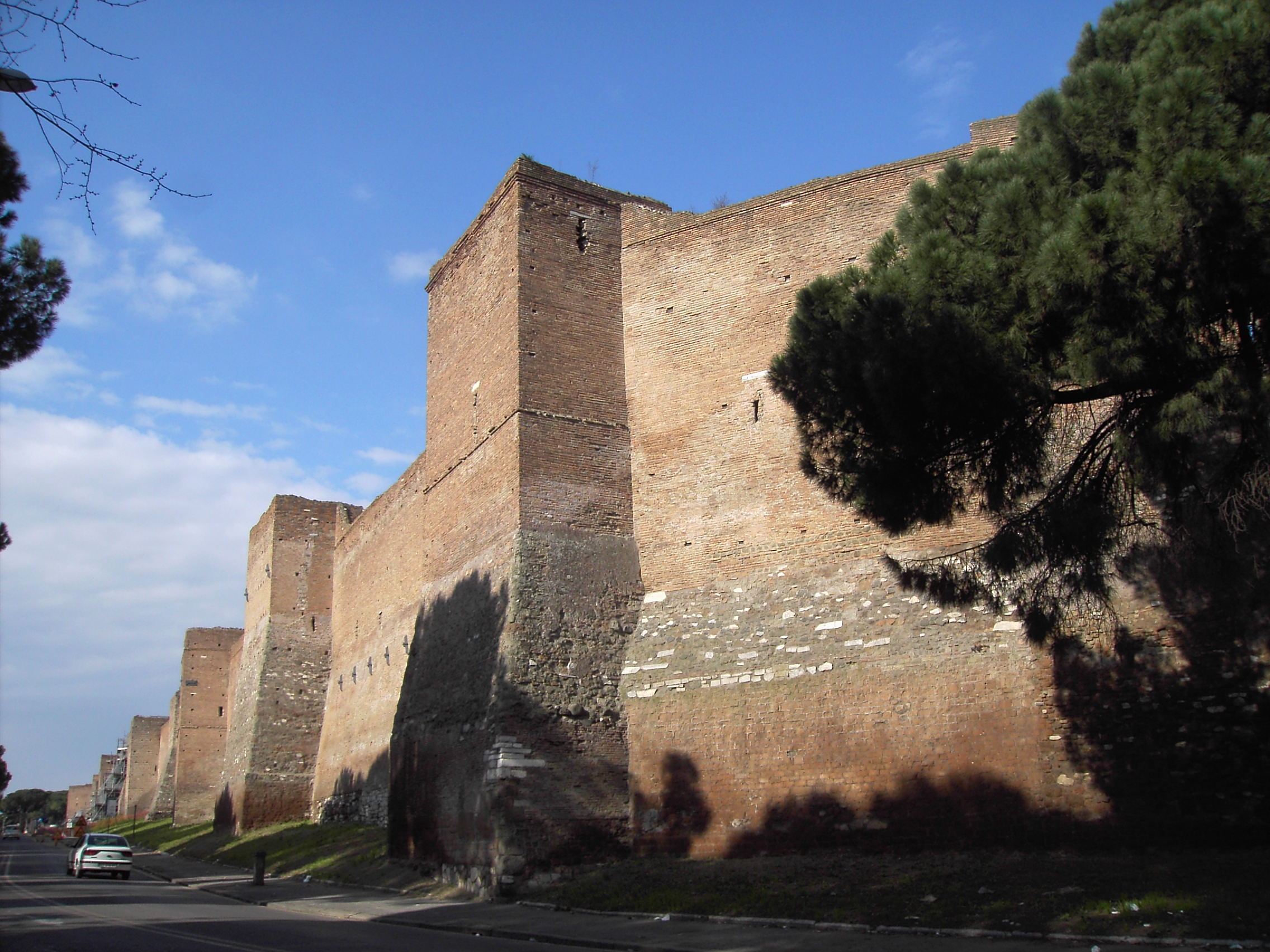
- A section of Aurelian Wall between the Porta Ardeatina and Porta San Sebastiano
Date	846
Location	Rome, Italy
Result	Muslims sack the outskirts of Rome but are prevented from entering the city itself by the Aurelian Walls.

Belligerents
Christian League: Frankish Empire; Duchy of Spoleto; Duchy of Naples; Papal States	Muslim fleet (Note: Likely led by the Arab Aghlabid dynasty. See article for details.)

Commanders and leaders
Guy I of Spoleto; Caesar of Naples; Pope Sergius II	Unknown

Strength
Unknown	Unknown

In 846, Muslim raiders plundered the outskirts of the city of Rome, sacking the basilicas of Old St Peter's and St Paul's-Outside-the-Walls, but were prevented from entering the city itself by the Aurelian Walls.

== Background ==
In the 820s, the Aghlabids of Ifriqiya (known by medieval Italians as the Saracens) began their conquest of Sicily. In 842, Muslim forces under the rule of Muhammad Abul Abbas took Messina, Sicily. Around the same time Radelchis and Siconulf, rivals engaged in civil war over the Principality of Benevento, hired Muslim mercenaries.

There is disagreement among the chroniclers over the origins of the raiders who attacked Rome, although most sources describe them as Saracens. According to the Liber Pontificalis and the Chronicle of Monte Cassino, the raiders were Saracens from Africa who raided Corsica before attacking Rome. The Annals of Fulda, on the other hand, describe the raiders as Moors (Latin: mauri), which generally indicated Muslims from al-Andalus (Spain) or the Maghreb, as opposed to Ifriqiya. The author of the Annals of Xanten was unsure: he called the raiders "either Moors or else Saracens". It is possible that the annals, which are from north of the Alps, were using "Moors" as a synonym for "Saracens". No Italian source describes the raiders of 846 as Moors.

In 842 or thereabouts, according to the Deeds of the Bishops of Naples, Saracens from Sicily occupied the Pontine Islands and the isle of Licosa, but were driven off by Duke Sergius I of Naples and a coalition he had formed with Amalfi, Gaeta and Sorrento. Deprived of their island bases, these Saracens occupied the harbour of Miseno near Naples. From there they launched their attack on Rome the next year. This source can be reconciled with those which give the raiders an African origin since the Muslims then conquering Sicily under the Aghlabids were originally from Africa.

Muslim raids on Sicily began as early as 652 with an attack on Syracuse. In 827, the Aghlabids launched a full-scale invasion of the island, reportedly invited by a disgraced Byzantine governor seeking revenge. Key cities fell in succession—Palermo in 831, Messina in 843, and Syracuse in 878—culminating in the complete conquest of Sicily by 902. The Aghlabids also expanded into mainland Italy, reaching Naples in 837 at the request of its Christian duke, and later establishing a presence in Bari along the Adriatic coast. In 846, they conducted a raid on Rome and its surrounding territories.

== Raid ==
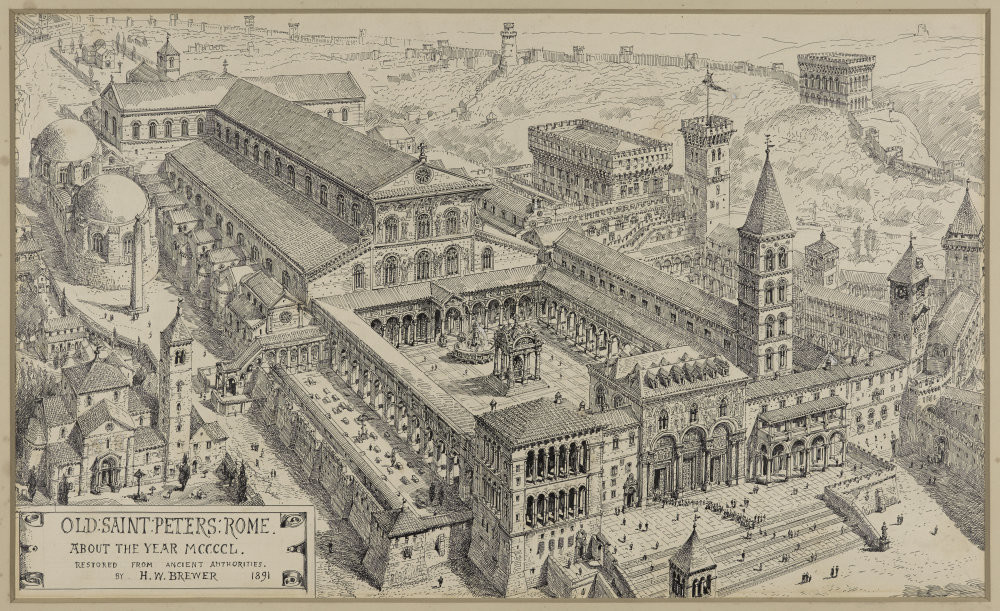
Old St Peter's, 19th-century reconstruction

A large force landed at Porto and Ostia in 846, annihilating the garrison of Nova Ostia. The Muslims struck following the Tiber and the Ostiense and Portuense roads, as the Roman militia hastily retreated to the safety of the Roman walls.

At the same time, other Muslim forces landed at Centumcellae, marching towards Rome.

Some basilicas, such as Old St Peter's and Saint Paul Outside the Walls, were outside the Aurelian Walls, and thus easy targets. They were "filled to overflowing with rich liturgical vessels and with jewelled reliquaries housing all of the relics recently amassed". The most important among them were the golden cross erected above the alleged tomb of Saint Peter, the so-called Pharum Hadriani, and the silver table donated to the church by Charlemagne, and adorned with a representation of Constantinople. As a result, the raiders pillaged the surroundings of the city and desecrated the two holy shrines. Some historians believe the raiders had known exactly where to look for the most valuable treasures.

No contemporary account hints at any attempt to penetrate the city, but it is possible that the Romans defended the walls, while around Saint Peter's, members of the Vatican scholae (Saxons, Lombards, Frisians and Franks) attempted to resist, but were defeated.

In the meantime, a Frankish army coming from Spoleto and headed by Lombard Duke Guy, attacked the Muslims, hindered by booty and prisoners, in front of the city walls, pursuing a part of them until Centumcellae, while another group tried to reach Misenum by land. The Saracens were able to embark, but a storm destroyed many ships, bringing onto the beaches many corpses adorned with jewels which could be recovered. After that, the Lombard army headed south, reaching the Muslims at Gaeta, where another battle was engaged. On that occasion, only the arrival of Cesarius, son of Sergius, Magister Militum of Naples, decided the battle in favour of the Christians.

== Aftermath ==
The Muslim raid of 846 marked the beginning of increased Muslim incursions into the Italian Peninsula. Their expansion into Italy was severely affecting the economy of the Papal States. By the time of Pope John VIII (r. 872–882), the threat had intensified to the point where he reportedly paid tribute to the Muslims to prevent further attacks. Pope John VIII sought assistance from Charles the Bald, the Byzantine Empire, and several southern Italian cities in response to increased Muslim naval raids along the Tyrrhenian Sea coast during the 9th century. Due to lack of support, the pope ultimately paid 25,000 silver mancusi to the Muslims to secure peace for the Church's territories. The threatening Muslim military presence (which he believed was God's punishment against "bad Christians"), coupled with alliances they formed with the local Christians, prompted John to promote "a new and uncompromisingly hostile view of the Saracens." This included a ban on forming alliances with the Muslims. However, his efforts proved unsuccessful.

In the spring of 847 (or possibly late 846), a major council was held in Francia in response to the Muslim raid. Its location is unknown, but it was probably in the south. It was attended by many bishops and by Emperor Lothar I and King Louis II of Italy. It issued a capitulary, which survives. With contingents from Francia, Burgundy and Provence and his own Italian forces, Louis launched a campaign against the Muslims occupying Benevento. The Annals of Saint-Bertin record the campaign as a success.

Shortly after the siege, Pope Leo IV began the Leonine Wall on the right bank of the Tiber, in order to protect the Church of St. Peter. In 849, another Muslim raid against Ostia would be repelled; the Saracen survivors were made prisoners, enslaved and sent to work in chain gangs building the Leonine Wall. The territory enclosed by the wall, defended by Castel Sant'Angelo, was named the Leonine City after the pope, and was considered a separate town with its own administration. It joined the city in the sixteenth century, becoming the fourteenth rione of Rome, Borgo. Rome would never again be threatened by an Muslim army.

== See also ==
- Early Caliphate navy
- History of Islam in southern Italy

== Sources ==
- Gregorovius, Ferdinand (1988). Storia della città di Roma nel Medioevo (in Italian). Vol. 3. Roma: Gherardo Casini Editore. ISBN 9788840381756.
- Kreutz, Barbara (1996). Before the Normans: Southern Italy in the Ninth and Tenth Centuries. University of Pennsylvania Press.
- Lankila, Tommi P. (2013). "The Saracen Raid of Rome in 846: An Example of Maritime Ghazw". In Sylvia Akar; Jaakko Hämeen-Anttila; Inka Nokso-Koivisto (eds.). Travelling through Time: Essays in honour of Kaj Öhrnberg. Studia Orientalia. Vol. 114. Helsinki: Societas Orientalis Fennica. pp. 93–120. ISBN 978-951-9380-84-1. ISSN 0039-3282.
- Naylor, Phillip C. (2009). North Africa: A History from Antiquity to the Present. Princeton University Press. p. 71.
- Partner, Peter (1972). The Lands of St. Peter: The Papal State in the Middle Ages and the Early Renaissance. University of California Press. ISBN 9780520021815.
- Screen, Elina (2020). "Carolingian Fathers and Sons in Italy: Lothar I and Louis II's Successful Partnership". In Clemens Gantner; Walter Pohl (eds.). After Charlemagne: Carolingian Italy and its Rulers. Cambridge University Press. pp. 148–163.
