= Battle of Ostia (painting) =

Workshop of Raphael, Vatican City

The Battle of Ostia
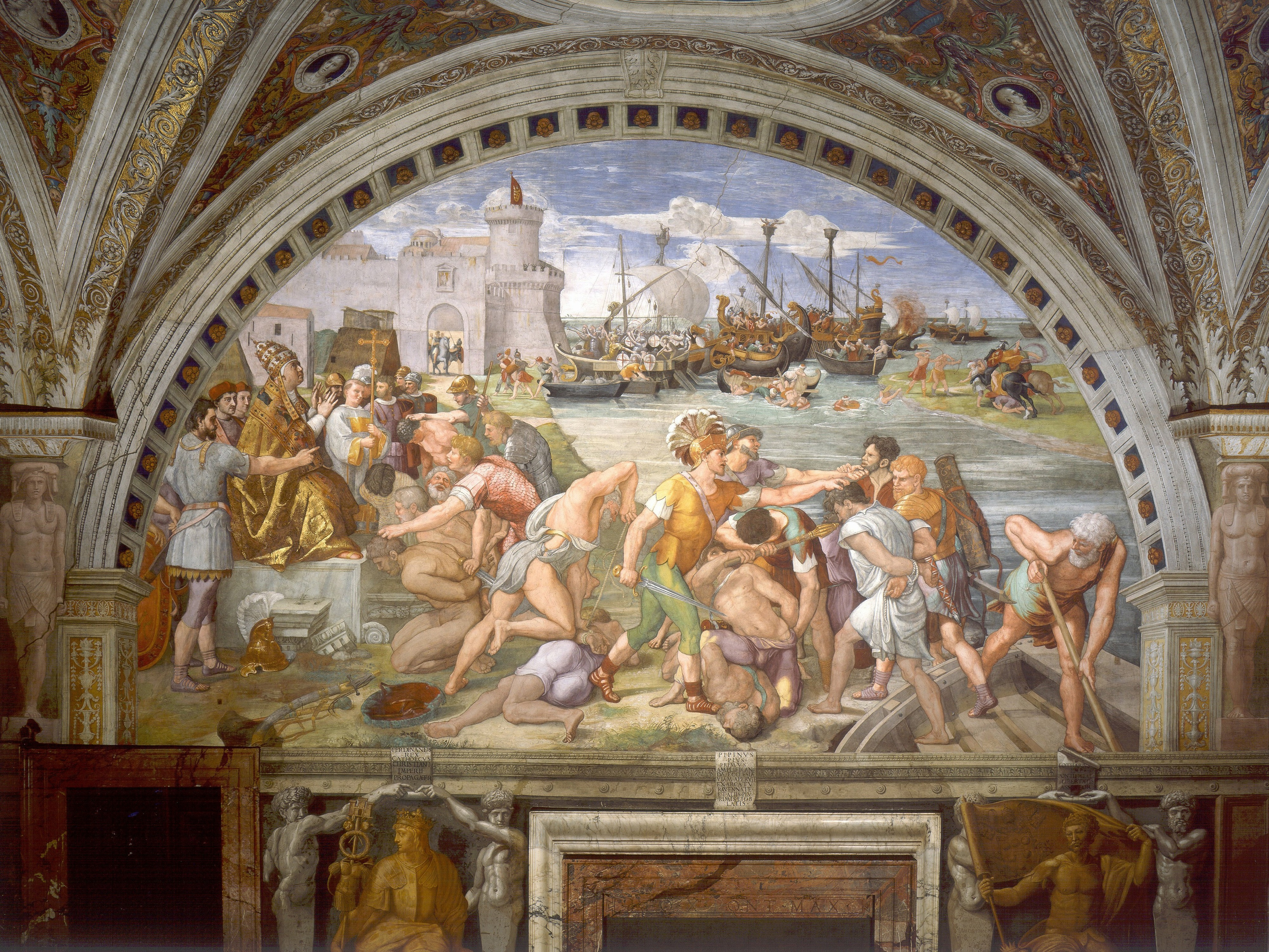
- Artist: Workshop of Raphael
- Year: 1514–1515
- Type: Fresco
- Dimensions: 770 cm (300 in) wide
- Location: Apostolic Palace, Vatican Museums, Vatican City

The Battle of Ostia (Battaglia di Ostia) is a painting by the workshop of the Italian Renaissance artist Raphael. The painting was part of Raphael's commission to decorate the rooms that are now known as the Stanze di Raffaello, in the Apostolic Palace in the Vatican. It is located in the room that was named after The Fire in the Borgo, the Stanza dell'incendio del Borgo and was inspired by the naval battle fought in 849 between the Arab and a Christian League of Papal, Neapolitan and Gaetan ships. In the painting Pope Leo IV, with the features of Pope Leo X, is giving thanks after the Arab ships were destroyed by a storm.
