= Athanasius I =

Athanasius I may refer to:

- Athanasius of Alexandria (c. 293 – 373), also called Pope Athanasius I of Alexandria, Christian theologian
- Athanasius I Gammolo (died 631), Syriac Patriarch of Antioch
- Athanasius I (bishop of Naples) (830–872)
- Athanasius I of Constantinople (1230–1310), Ecumenical Patriarch of Constantinople
