= Gregory III of Naples =

Gregory III (died March 870), eldest son of Sergius I of Naples and Drusa, was the duke of Naples as co-regent with his father from 850 and as successor to his father from his father's death in 864 to his own some six years later. He was recorded as a man of learning, fluent in both Greek and Latin.

During his tenure, his brothers played a significant role. Caesar was his admiral, Athanasius was bishop of the city, and Stephen was bishop of Sorrento. Sergius, their father, allied with Landulf, the gastald of Suessola and Sessa (Note: There are two places called Sessa in Campania, namely Sessa Aurunca and Sessa Cilento. The former is considerably the larger of the two (15 times the population), has a history dating back to pre-Roman times. and is the seat of a bishopric; it seems the more likely place.) and son of Lando I, Count of Capua.

In 859, Gregory received the Byzantine title of magister militum. In May that year, a massive joint expedition of Salerno, Naples, and Amalfi marched on Capua, led by Caesar and Gregory, and their brother-in-law of Suessola. Lando I was in a paralysis at that time and his son Lando II took up arms to defend the city. He defeated the forces sent against them, numbering some 7,000, at the bridge of Teodemondo over the Volturno. Caesar was captured with 800 soldiers and led back to Capua in a triumph. Erchempert places the battle on 8 May, the day of Michael the Archangel, whose cult was popular among the Lombards. It is therefore significant to Erchempert (a Lombard) that the Lombard Lando should defeat a largely Greek army on such a day.

Sergius, before dying, bade his son to follow the counsel of his brother the bishop, who was a familiaris of the Emperor Louis II and a papal legate with connections in the Roman curia. In 866, Gregory personally accompanied Louis against Capua, Salerno, and Amalfi. In the spring of 867, however, he commended himself and his duchy to the Byzantine emperor Basil I and began minting Byzantine coins with Basil's effigy again. Gregory fell seriously ill in January 870 and left the government to his son Sergius II, who was succeeded by his other son, Athanasius II. He died in March.

== Sources ==
- Erchempert. Historia Langabardorvm Beneventarnorvm at The Latin Library.
- Caravale, Mario (ed). Dizionario Biografico degli Italiani: LXIII Labroca – Laterza. Rome, 2004.
- Caravale, Mario (ed). Dizionario Biografico degli Italiani: LIX Graziando – Grossi Gondi. Rome, 2002.

Preceded by Sergius I	Duke of Naples; 864–870	Succeeded by Sergius II
