= Sergius II of Naples =

Sergius II was Duke of Naples from 870 to 877.

He continued the policies of his father, Gregory III, and grandfather, Sergius I. He maintained good relations with the Franks or the Byzantines only as it suited Neapolitan interests.

He was briefly prefect of Amalfi for thirteen days in 866, following the prefect Maurus.

In January 870, his father fell seriously ill and left him the government. Gregory died in March. It is written that Sergius made Naples "into another Palermo, another Africa," by his friendly relations with the Aghlabids. For this, he earned the excommunication of Pope John VIII. He also earned the opposition of his uncle, Bishop Athanasius I and exiled him to an island. Sergius was blinded and deposed by his brother Athanasius II, Bishop of Naples, who delivered him to Rome. His son Gregory IV eventually succeeded to the ducal throne.

== Sources ==
- Naples in the Dark Ages by David Taylor and Jeff Matthews.
- Chalandon, Ferdinand (1907). Histoire de la domination normande en Italie et en Sicilie. Paris.

| Preceded by Gregory III | Duke of Naples; 870 – 877 | Succeeded by Athanasius |
