= Siege of Messina (842–843) =

842 – 843 Aghlabid siege against the Byzantine city of Messina

- Part of the Muslim conquest of Sicily
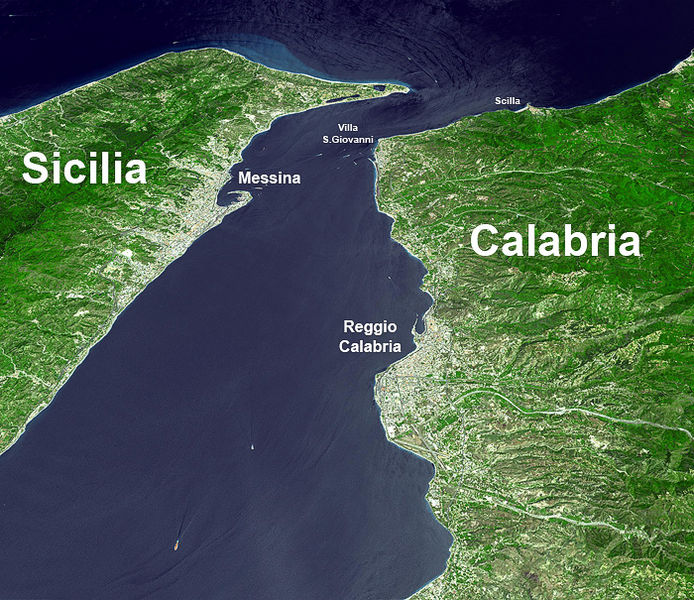
- Strait of Messina, which the Aghlabids gained control after the capture of Messina
Date	10 October 842 – 29 September 843
Location	Messina
Result	Aghlabid–Neapolitan victory

Belligerents
Byzantine Empire	Aghlabids; Duchy of Naples

Commanders and leaders
Unknown	Al-Fadl bin Jafar al-Hamadhani

Strength
Unknown	Unknown

Casualties and losses
Unknown	Unknown

The siege of Messina was launched by the Aghlabids, allied with the Neapolitans, against the Byzantine city of Messina from 842 to 843. The Allied forces managed to capture the city after a long siege.

== Siege ==
The Arabs began transferring their military operations to the far east of the island of Sicily and set out to besiege the city of Messina. The Aghlabids were allied with the Neapolitans and besieged the city from land and sea. The Aghlabids were led by Fadl bin Jafar al-Hamadhani. The city fiercely resisted the Arabs, repelling all of their assaults. Al-Fadl made a plan; he secretly sent part of his force to the mountains behind the city of Messina. Al-Fadl then launched a vigorous assault from the sea. While the Byzantine garrison concentrated on repelling the assaults, the Aghlabid force marched down from the mountains and scaled the walls behind the Byzantines. Seeing this, the Byzantine garrison soon capitulated, and Messina was taken. The siege lasted from October 10, 842, to September 29, 843.

The victory at Messina allowed the Aghlabids to control the crucial strait of Messina, and there the Aghlabids launched their raids into southern Italy.

== Sources ==
- Alexander A. Vasiliev, Byzantium and the Arabs. Volume I, The Amorium dynasty (820–867).
- John Bagnell Bury, A history of the Eastern Roman empire.
- Fulvio Mazza, Messina storia, cultura, economia.
- David Abulafia, The Mediterranean in History.
