= Battle of Butera =

Battle between the Aghlabids and Byzantine Empire

- Part of the Muslim conquest of Sicily
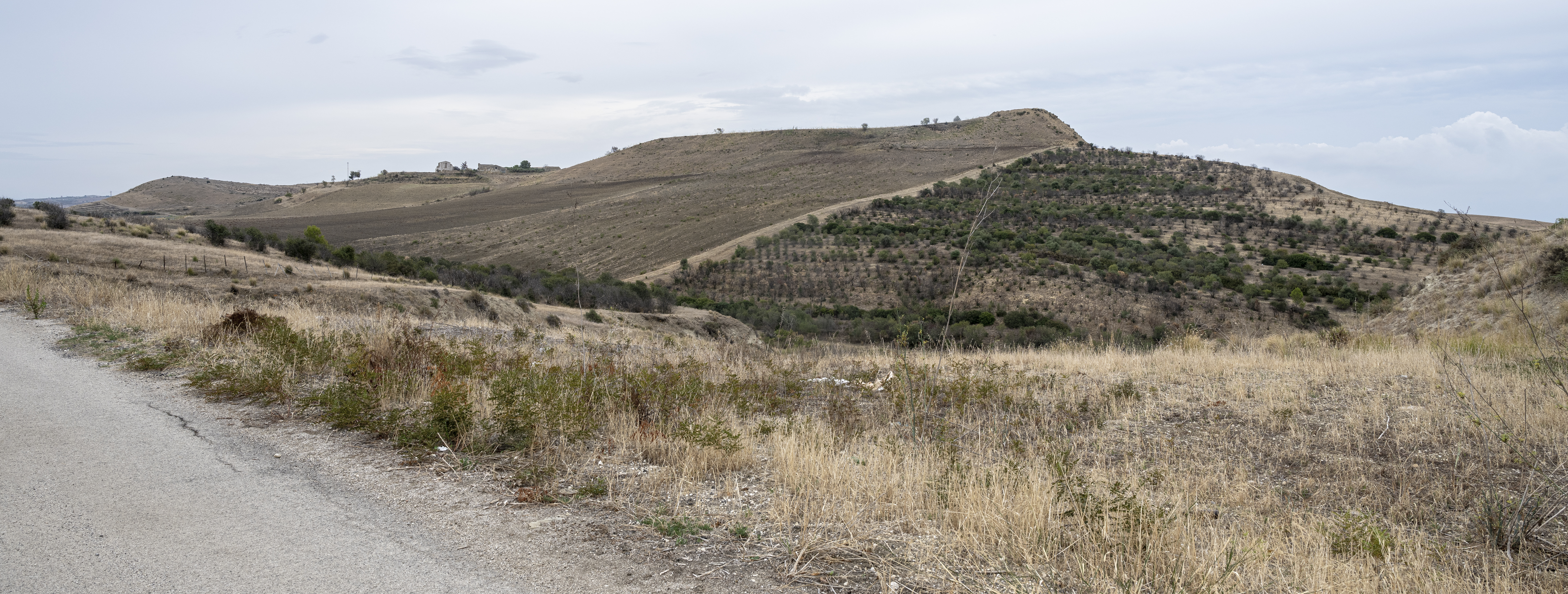
- Fields of Butera
Date	Late 845 or early 846
Location	Butera
Result	Aghlabid victory

Belligerents
Byzantine Empire	Aghlabids

Commanders and leaders
Unknown	Al-Abbas ibn al-Fadl

Strength
10,000 men	Unknown

Casualties and losses
9,000–10,000 killed (exaggeration)	3 killed

The Battle of Butera happened in late 845 or early 846 between the Aghlabid army and the Byzantine army at Butera, south of Sicily. The Aghlabids achieved a resounding success against the Byzantines.

== Background ==
In 842, with the death of Emperor Theophilos, the Sicilian people welcomed with relief the end of iconoclasm and the consequent restoration of the cult of images, desired and encouraged by the Byzantine empress, Theodora. In this context, and with a local population favorable to Byzantine rule, the empire seized the opportunity to attempt to deliver a decisive blow against the military advance of the Muslims in eastern Sicily.

In 845, the Byzantines and the Abbasids made a peace treaty. Empress Theodora, wanting to take advantage of the peace treaty, dispatched an army to re-establish Byzantine control of Sicily. The Byzantine army was mostly recruited from the theme of Charsianon.

== Battle ==
The Byzantine numbers were substantial, and they were equipped and ready to fight. The Byzantine general, however, was not ready. Both sides met at plains of Butera, and the Aghlabid general, Al-Abbas ibn al-Fadl, defeated the Byzantines, killing 9,000 to 10,000 of their troops while fleeing, according to Arab sources, which is probably an exaggeration. The Aghlabid casualties were three killed, as stated by Arab sources. The battle happened either in late 845 or early 846.

== Aftermath ==
Following this defeat, the Byzantines suffered several setbacks in quick succession. In 846, the Arabs annexed Lentini and destroyed Ragusa in 848. For his victory at Butera, Al-Abbas became the governor of Sicily in 851.

== Sources ==
- Andrew Holt & Florin Curta (2016), Great Events in Religion, An Encyclopedia of Pivotal Events in Religious History.
- Michele Amari (1854), Storia dei Musulmani di Sicilia, Vol I (in Italian).
- Alexander A. Vasiliev (1935), Byzantium and the Arabs. Volume I, The Amorium dynasty (820–867) (in French).
