= Battle of Ostia =

Mediterranean naval battle of 849

Coordinates: 41.75°N 12.2833°E

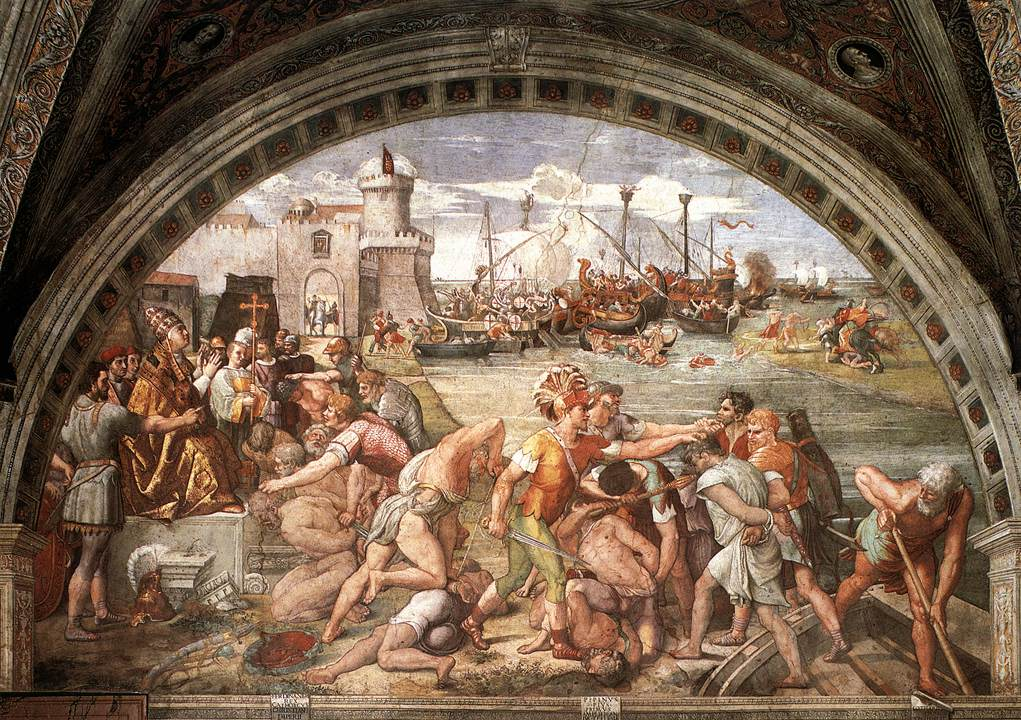
- Raphael's fresco The Battle of Ostia, an indication of the battle's legendary fame
Date	Summer 849
Location	Ostia, Italy
Result	Christian League victory

Belligerents
Christian League: Papal States; Byzantine Empire; Duchy of Gaeta; Duchy of Amalfi; Duchy of Naples	Muslim fleet (Note: Likely led by the Arab Aghlabid dynasty. See article for details.)

Commanders and leaders
Caesar of Naples; Pope Leo IV	Unknown

Strength
Unknown	Unknown

Casualties and losses
Minimal	Heavy

The naval Battle of Ostia took place in 849 in the Tyrrhenian Sea between a Muslim fleet and an Italian league of Papal, Neapolitan, Amalfitan, and Gaetan ships. The battle ended in favor of the Italian league, as they defeated the Muslims. It is one of the few events to occur in southern Italy during the ninth century that is still commemorated today, largely through the walls named after Leo and for the Renaissance painting Battaglia di Ostia by Raphael.

== Background ==
Starting in 827, Muslim forces began the conquest of Sicily and from 835, the Aghlabids began campaigning on the Italian mainland. Their invasions of Calabria and Apulia, as well as their attacks on other central Mediterranean islands, were probably undertaken as an extension of their conquest of Sicily, aiming to aid the conquest by attacking Byzantine positions in the region. The outskirts of Rome were raided by a Muslim force in 846, although it is not certain that the raiders came from Aghlabid territory. Another attack towards Rome took place in 849, leading to the Battle of Ostia.

== Battle ==
News of a massing of Muslim ships off Sardinia reached Rome early in 849. A Christian armada, commanded by Caesar, son of Sergius I of Naples, was assembled off recently refortified Ostia, and Pope Leo IV came out to bless it and offer a mass to the troops. After the Muslim ships appeared, battle was joined with the Neapolitan, Amalfitan, and Gaetan galleys, reunited in the Campanian League. Midway through the engagement, a storm divided the Muslims and the Christian ships managed to return to port. The Muslims, however, were scattered far and wide, with many ships lost and others sent ashore. When the storm died down, the remnants of the Muslim fleet were easily picked off, with many prisoners taken.

== Aftermath ==
In the aftermath of the battle, much flotsam and jetsam washed ashore and was pillaged by the locals, per jus naufragii. The prisoners taken in battle were forced to work in chain gangs building the Leonine Wall which was to encompass the Vatican Hill. Rome would never again be approached by a Muslim army.

== See also ==
- Papal Navy
- Muslim raid on Rome
- Campanian League

== Sources ==
- Llewellyn, Peter (1970). Rome in the Dark Ages. London: Faber and Faber.
