= Caesar of Naples =

Byzantine admiral

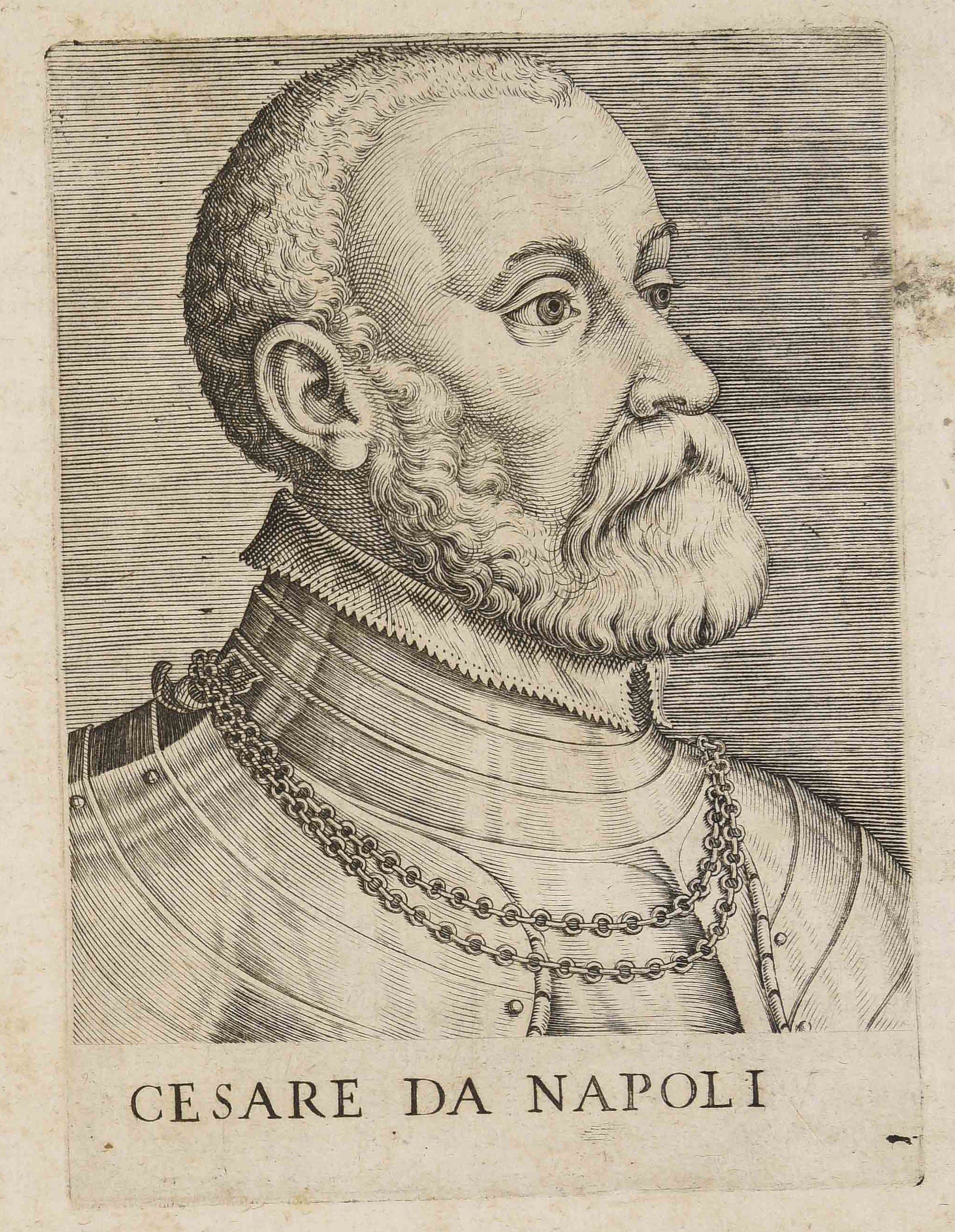
- Cesare da Napoli, engraving by Aliprando Caprioli
- Born: 9th century
- Died: 870 (aged 69–70)
- Relatives: Sergius I of Naples (father); Gregory III of Naples (brother)
- Military career
- Allegiance: Duchy of Naples
- Branch: Navy
- Rank: Admiral
- Conflicts: Battle of Licosa; Battle of Ostia; Battle of Gaeta; Battle at Volturno

Caesar the Brave (Caesarius, Italian: Cesario il Valoroso) was the admiral of the fleet of the Duchy of Naples during the reigns (840 – 870 AD) of his father, Sergius I, and brother, Gregory III.

In 846, he commanded the Neapolitan contingent in the Christian victory over the Saracens at Gaeta. In 849, he commanded the Neapolitans and the Campanian League at the Battle of Ostia.

In May 859, a massive joint expedition of Salerno, Naples, Amalfi, and Suessola marched on Capua. Count Lando I was in paralysis at that time and his son Lando II took up arms to defend the city. He defeated the forces sent against them, led by Caesar and Gregory, at the bridge of Teodemondo over the Volturno. Caesar was captured with 800 soldiers and led back to Capua in chains. Erchempert places the battle on 8 May, the day of Michael the Archangel, whose cult was popular among the Lombards. It is therefore significant to Erchempert (a Lombard) that the Lombard Lando should defeat a largely Greek army on such a day.

In 870 Caesar was imprisoned by his nephew, Sergius II, having opposed his closeness to the Aghlabids, and he died in prison.

== Sources ==
- Kreutz, Barbara M. (1996). Before the Normans: Southern Italy in the Ninth and Tenth Centuries. University of Pennsylvania Press. ISBN 978-0-8122-1587-8.
- Llewellyn, Peter (1970). Rome in the Dark Ages. London: Faber and Faber.
