= Duchy of Amalfi =

Independent state centered on the Southern Italian city of Amalfi

Coordinates: 40°38′N 14°36′E

Duchy of Amalfi Ducatus Amalphitanus
- 958–1137
- Flag Coat of arms

- Italy, and the Duchy of Amalfi (a small state in bright yellow), at the close of the tenth century.
- Status: Independent state
- Capital: Amalfi
- Common languages: Latin, Greek, and Neapolitan
- Religion: Roman Catholicism, Judaism, Eastern Orthodox Church
- Government: Elective duchy
- Duke
  - 957–958: Mastalus II (first)
  - 1096–c.1100: Marinus Sebastus (last)
- Historical era: Middle Ages
  - Duke elected: 958
  - Sacked by Pisa: 1137

Population
  - 1131: 70,000
- Currency: Solidus; Tarì
Preceded by	Succeeded by
Duchy of Naples	Kingdom of Sicily
- Today part of: Italy

The Duchy of Amalfi (Latin: Ducatus Amalphitanus) or the Republic of Amalfi was a de facto independent state centered on the Southern European city of Amalfi during the 10th and 11th centuries. The city and its territory were originally part of the larger Duchy of Naples, governed by a patrician, but it extracted itself from Byzantine vassalage and first elected a duke (or doge) in 958.

During the 10th and 11th centuries Amalfi was estimated to have a population of 50,000–70,000 people. It rose to become an economic powerhouse, a commercial center whose merchants dominated Mediterranean and Italian trade in the ninth and tenth centuries, before being surpassed and superseded by the other maritime republics of the North and the Centre: Pisa, Venice, Genoa, Ancona and Gaeta. In 1073, Amalfi lost its independence, falling to Norman invasion and subsequently to Pisa in 1137.

== History ==
The city of Amalfi was founded as a trading post in 339. Its first bishop was appointed in 596. In 838, the city was captured by Sicard of Benevento with help from traitors within the city, who led him in through the waterward defenses. Many of the Amalfitans in Salerno sacked that city and left. In 839, Amalfi freed itself from Lombard domination and elected a prefect. Nearby Atrani participated in these early prefectural elections. Subsequently, Amalfi helped to free Siconulf to oppose the ruling Prince of Benevento. In 897, the self-governing republic, still nominally tied to the Byzantine Empire, was defeated in a war with Sorrento, supported by Naples, in which her prefect was captured, later ransomed. In 914, the prefect Mastalus I was appointed first judge. In 903 the Amalfitans joined forces with Naples to attack the Arabs that had established themselves on the banks of the Garigliano river. However the combined forces of Amalfi and the Naples were driven back by the Arabs and their allies, the Italian city state of Gaeta. In 915 Amalfi did not join the Battle of Garigliano to fight against the Arabs. This was most likely because since 909 Amalfi had been heavily trading with the Fatimid Caliphate and did not want to jeopardize relations with this powerful trade partner. In 958, Mastalus II was assassinated and Sergius I was elected first duke (or doge). From 981 to 983, Amalfi ruled the Principality of Salerno. In 987, the Amalfitan bishopric was raised to archiepiscopal status.

From 1034, Amalfi came under the control of the Principality of Capua and, in 1039, that of Salerno. In 1073, Robert Guiscard conquered the city and took the title dux Amalfitanorum "duke of the Amalfitans". In 1096, Amalfi revolted, but this was put down in 1101. It revolted again in 1130 and was finally subdued in 1131, when the Emir John marched on Amalfi by land and George of Antioch blockaded the town by sea and set up a base on Capri. In 1135 and 1137, Pisa sacked the city and the glory of Amalfi was past.

The Arab traveller Ibn Hawqal, writing in 977 during the great reign of Manso I, described Amalfi as:

... la più prospera città di Longobardia, la più nobile, la più illustre per le sue condizioni, la più agiata ed opulenta. Il territorio di Amalfi confina con quello di Napoli; la quale è bella città, ma meno importante di Amalfi.

... the most prosperous Lombard city, the most noble, the most illustrious for its conditions, the most wealthy and opulent. The territory of Amalfi borders that of Naples; a beautiful city, but less important than Amalfi.

The title "Duke of Amalfi" was revived in the later 14th century as a title used within the Kingdom of Naples.

== Importance ==
After the Amalfitans broke free of Lombard control they did not return to Neapolitan control but instead stated their independence. After 839 Amalfi was an independent entity and created a strong maritime presence. Amalfi had strong economic ties with both the Byzantine Empire and the Fatimid Caliphate. The Amalfitans had a permanent and important presence in Constantinople during the 10th and 11th centuries. Amalfitans also created Latin Christian outposts in the Levant around 1040 and hostels for Christian pilgrims in Jerusalem and Antioch. During the 10th and 11th centuries Amalfi was dominating trade and commerce with North Africa and the Levant, and one of the major exports from Amalfi during the Middle Ages was the chestnut.

== Legacy ==
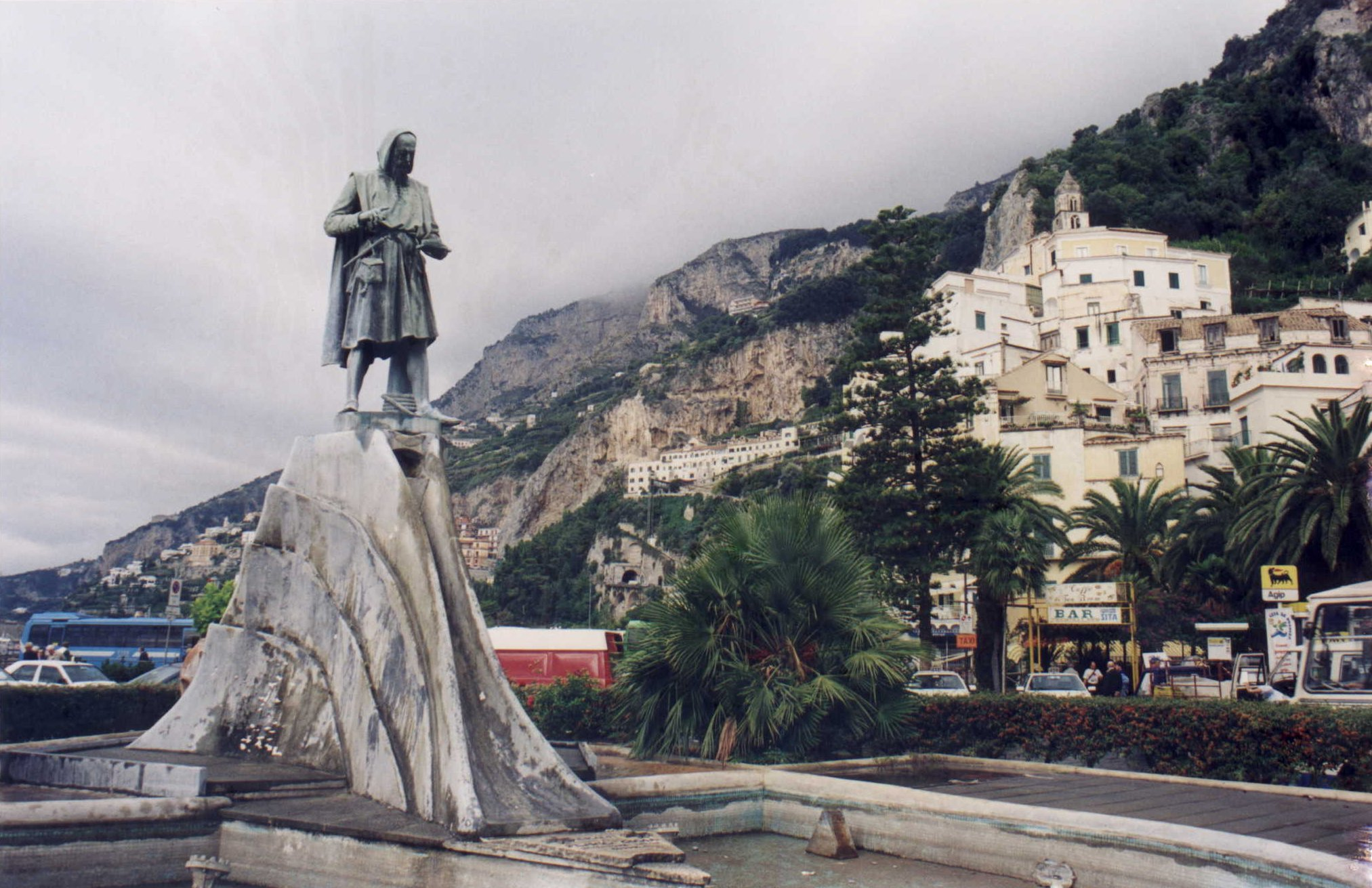
Statute of Flavio Gioia in Amalfi by Alfonso Balzico, 1900

While the Duchy of Amalfi never regained its independence after 1137, the city of Amalfi was still important to maritime trade for the next 200 years, until 1343, when an earthquake and a storm destroyed most of its harbor. The most important contribution Amalfi made during those 200 years was probably the perfection of the modern-day box compass. Between 1295 and 1302, Flavio Gioia converted the compass from a needle floating in water to what we use today, a round box with a compass card that rotates 360 degrees attached to a magnetic element.

The Knights Hospitaller, a Catholic military order that was active during and after the Crusades, was founded by Benedictine monks from Amalfi and used the duchy's eight-pointed cross as one of its symbols. It is believed that the symbol originated in the Byzantine Empire in the 6th century before being used in Amalfi. When the Knights Hospitaller moved to Malta in the 16th century it became known as the Maltese cross, and is still used today by the Sovereign Military Order of Malta.

== See also ==
- Dukes of Amalfi
- Amalfi Coast
- Maritime republics

== Bibliography ==
- Pavan, Massimiliano (1960). Dizionario Biografico degli Italiani. Istituto della Enciclopedia italiana.
- Skinner, Patricia (1995). Family Power in Southern Italy: The Duchy of Gaeta and Its Neighbours, 850–1139. London: Cambridge University Press. ISBN 0-521-52205-6.
- Norwich, John Julius (1967). The Normans in the South, 1016-1130. London: Longman.
- Norwich, John Julius (1970). The Normans in the South 1016–1130. London: Longman.
- Curtis, Edmund (1912). Roger of Sicily and the Normans in Lower Italy, 1016–1154. New York: G. P. Putnam's Sons.
- Donald, Matthew (1992). The Norman kingdom of Sicily. London: Cambridge University Press. ISBN 0-521-26911-3.
- Houben, Hubert (2002). Roger II of Sicily: a ruler between East and West. London: Cambridge University Press. ISBN 0-521-65573-0.
- Chalandon, Ferdinand (1907). Histoire de la domination normande en Italie et en Sicile (in French). Paris: Librairie A. Picard et fils.
