= Sergius I of Naples =

Duke of Naples (died 864)

Sergius I (died 864) was the first duke of Naples of his dynasty, often dubbed the "Sergi," which ruled over Naples for almost three centuries from his accession in 840 until the death of his namesake Sergius VII in 1137.

Sergius was originally the dux of Cumae, a Neapolitan dependency. In 840, with the Franks trying to take the city, the people elected Sergius as duke (or magister militum) of Naples. This was a move towards complete independence from the Byzantine Empire, which was incapable of defending the Ducatus Neapolitanus from the Lombards. Sergius continued the beneficial alliance the Neapolitans had made with the Saracens of Palermo earlier. He aided them in taking Bari from the Byzantines in 841 and Messina in 842. By turning away from the Byzantines and towards the papacy and the Franks, he opened the way for the expulsion of the Muslims from the Campania.

The Saracens soon became too dangerous to keep as friends and Naples was forced to ally in the Campanian League with Amalfi, Gaeta, and Sorrento, its practically independent underlings, and make war on the Muslims. The Christians forced them out of Ponza and defended Rome in 846, though the Vatican was sacked. In 849 the son of Sergius, Caesarius, led his fleet alongside those of Gaeta, Amalfi, Sorrento and the Papal forces in the successful Battle of Ostia.

Sergius allied himself, furthermore, with the Emperors Lothair I and Louis II. In 847, Sergius was charged, along with Guy I of Spoleto, with establishing peace between the Lombard princes Siconulf of Salerno and Radelchis I of Benevento. In 850, Sergius attempted (successfully) to make the duchy hereditary when he appointed his eldest son, Gregory, as co-duke. He began to mint his own coins with his own effigy on them.

In 859, Sergius made war with Capua. He married his daughter to Landulf, gastald of Suessola, son of Lando I of Capua. With the gastald, he sent his sons Gregory and Caesarius to sack New Capua. They failed. Sergius' other sons, Athanasius and Stephen, also played an important role in Neapolitan politics. The former became bishop of Naples, an imperial familiaris, and a papal legate and intimate of the Roman curia. Stephen held the bishopric of Sorrento. Before dying, Sergius bade Gregory to follow the counsel of his brother the bishop. Gregory did succeed on Sergius' death and the hereditary, independent dukedom was born.

== See also ==
- History of Naples

== Sources ==
- Naples in the Dark Ages by David Taylor and Jeff Matthews.
- Erchempert. Historia Langabardorvm Beneventarnorvm at The Latin Library.
- Caravale, Mario (ed). Dizionario Biografico degli Italiani: LIX Graziando – Grossi Gondi. Rome, 2002.
- Chalandon, Ferdinand. Histoire de la domination normande en Italie et en Sicilie. Paris, 1907.

Preceded by Contardus	Duke of Naples; 840–864	Succeeded by Gregory III
