= San Gennaro dei Poveri =

Church in Naples, Italy

Coordinates: 40.861740°N 14.246547°E

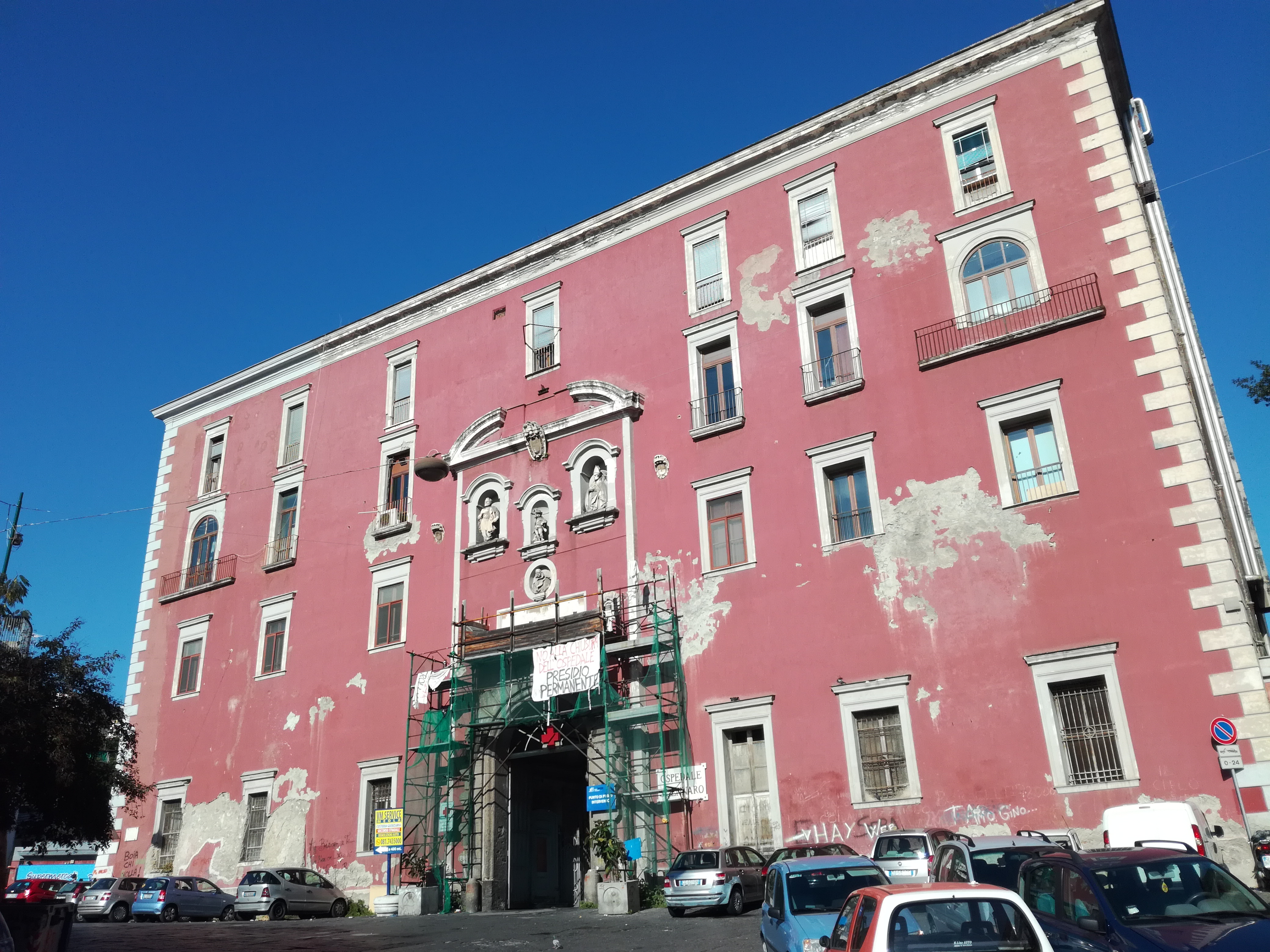
San Gennaro dei Poveri in Naples.

San Gennaro dei Poveri is a former monastery and church complex, later converted into a hospital for indigent located on Via San Gennaro dei Poveri #25 in the Rione Sanità, of the city of Naples, Italy. The elongated complex rises towards Capodimonte, lying just south of the domed Basilica dell'Incoronata Madre del Buon Consiglio.

== History ==
Originally, the site housed a paleo-Christian church, putatively erected at the site of an ancient Roman temple dedicated to Vulcan. Supposedly the then Bishop of Naples, later St Severus of Naples (died 409), transferred the venerated relics of St Januarius, to a church of San Gennaro extra Moenia (San Gennaro outside the walls) located on the northernmost corner of the complex. Over the following centuries, these relics were divided and moved till they were putatively collected in the Cathedral of San Gennaro in central Naples.

By the early 9th century, a Benedictine monastery with an attached hospital was founded here under the government of Archbishop Athanasius I. The late 9th-century Archbishop and Duke of Naples, Athanasius of Naples, moved the body of his uncle and namesake from the Abbey of Montecassino to this church. By the 15th century, dissensions within the monastery led to its dissolution, and in 1468 the Cardinal Oliviero Carafa formulated the building into a hospital funded by various neighborhoods. After the plague of 1656, the hospital was expanded and by 1669 the viceroy Pietro Antonio of Aragon, seeking to move much of the indigent handicapped individuals (arcattoni) out of the city center, converted the hospital into a hospice for the poor.

As such, San Gennaro dei Poveri was the first hospice for the poor in Naples, and remained the major such site until the 1750s, when the much more ambitious project of the Royal Hospice for the Poor was built. San Gennaro still functions as a hospital.

== Architecture ==
The narrow four story façade, rising across from the Parco di San Gennaro, with statue filled niches above a large rounded portal leads into an elongated courtyard flanked by parallel wings. The façade statues, including those of St Peter and St Januarius by Cosimo Fanzago. At the north end of the courtyard is the former church of San Gennaro extra Moenia. The former church is used now for exhibitions.
