= 305 =

305 in various calendars
Gregorian calendar	305; CCCV
Ab urbe condita	1058
Assyrian calendar	5055
Balinese saka calendar	226–227
Bengali calendar	−289 – −288
Berber calendar	1255
Buddhist calendar	849
Burmese calendar	−333
Byzantine calendar	5813–5814
Chinese calendar	甲子年 (Wood Rat); 3002 or 2795 — to — 乙丑年 (Wood Ox); 3003 or 2796
Coptic calendar	21–22
Discordian calendar	1471
Ethiopian calendar	297–298
Hebrew calendar	4065–4066
- Hindu calendars
Vikram Samvat	361–362
Shaka Samvat	226–227
Kali Yuga	3405–3406
Holocene calendar	10305
Iranian calendar	317 BP – 316 BP
Islamic calendar	327 BH – 326 BH
Javanese calendar	185–186
Julian calendar	305; CCCV
Korean calendar	2638
Minguo calendar	1607 before ROC 民前1607年
Nanakshahi calendar	−1163
Seleucid era	616/617 AG
Thai solar calendar	847–848
Tibetan calendar	ཤིང་ཕོ་བྱི་བ་ལོ་ (male Wood-Rat); 431 or 50 or −722 — to — ཤིང་མོ་གླང་ལོ་ (female Wood-Ox); 432 or 51 or −721

Year 305 (CCCV) was a common year starting on Monday of the Julian calendar. At the time, it was known as the Year of the Consulship of Constantius and Valerius (or, less frequently, year 1058 Ab urbe condita). The denomination 305 for this year has been used since the early medieval period, when the Anno Domini calendar era became the prevalent method in Europe for naming years.

== Events ==
=== By place ===
==== Roman Empire ====
- May 1 – Emperor Diocletian abdicates and retires to his palace at Salona (modern Split) on the Adriatic coast, after a reign of nearly 21 years, in which the last vestiges of republican government have disappeared.
- Maximian retires from office, and leaves for Campania or Lucania (southern Italy), to live a life of ease in his luxury villas.
- Constantius I and Galerius are declared Augusti; Flavius Valerius Severus and Maximinus Daza are appointed Caesars.
- Constantius requests leave for his son Constantine I to join him in the west, who has been living at the courts of Diocletian and Galerius as a hostage. Galerius allows Constantine to return.
- Summer – Constantine joins his father at Bononia (Boulogne) in Gaul; they cross the Channel to Britain and make their way to Eboracum (York), capital of Britannia Secunda and home to a large military base. They campaign with success against the Picts.
- Galerius begins a series of campaigns against the Sarmatians, winning his first victory before the end of the year.
- Maximinus Daza persecutes the Christians of Egypt, many of whom take refuge in the desert. In time, this refuge leads to the monastic life. In these monasteries, Coptic writing develops, supporting the propagation of Christian texts.
- Patron of Pozzuoli, Saint Proculus, and patron of Naples, Saint Januarius are thrown to wild beasts in Pozzuoli's Flavian Amphitheater, then beheaded at Solfatara.
- In this or the following year, the Baths of Diocletian are dedicated; the thermae become the largest imperial baths in Rome.

==== Asia ====
- The Daysan River floods Edessa.

=== By topic ===
==== Commerce ====
- Landowners dominate the Roman Empire, and enjoy the title of senator, which exempts them from the crushing taxes imposed on the rest of the population. The Senate has lost all its power and the landowners almost never attend Senate sessions. Members of municipal senates (curiales or decuriones) are charged with the responsibility of collecting taxes and paying arrears; smaller landowners are held responsible for providing recruits for the Roman army, and with keeping wastelands under cultivation.

==== Religion ====
- Catherine makes a public confession of the Christian gospel at a sacrificial feast ordered by Maximinus Daza at Alexandria. A virgin of royal descent, she is tortured on a spiked wheel (later called the "Catherine Wheel") and beheaded; her remains are spirited to Mount Sinai.
- The Council of Illiberis decrees that priests must be celibate. Additionally, it condemns visiting the homes of Jews and prohibits Christian women from marrying Jews, unless they have converted.

== Births ==
- Yu Yi (or Zhigong), Chinese calligrapher and general (d. 345)

== Deaths ==
- Januarius I of Benevento, Roman bishop and martyr
- Catherine of Alexandria, Christian martyr and virgin
- Porphyry of Tyre, Neoplatonist philosopher and writer
- Proculus of Pozzuoli (or Proclus), Christian martyr
- Sossianus Hierocles, Roman proconsul and aristocrat
- Tuoba Yituo, Chinese chieftain of the Tuoba clan
- Vincent, Orontius, and Victor, Christian martyrs
- Wang Rong (or Junchong), Chinese politician (b. 234)
- Zuo Si (or Taichong), Chinese poet and writer (b. 250)
