= Agrippinus of Naples =

Italian Roman Catholic saint

Saint Agrippinus of Naples

Bishop
- Died: end of the 3rd century
- Venerated in: Roman Catholic Church
- Major shrine: cathedral of Naples
- Feast: November 9
- Patronage: Naples (co-patron)

Saint Agrippinus (Arpinus) of Naples (Italian: Sant'Agrippino di Napoli, Sant'Arpino) (3rd century) was a bishop of Naples and is venerated in that city as a saint. According to tradition, Agrippinus was the sixth bishop of Naples. He lived at the end of the 3rd century, and seems not to have been a martyr.

== Burial and veneration ==
At one point, Agrippinus seems to have been as popular as the more celebrated Saint Januarius (San Gennaro).

The foundation of the church of San Gennaro extra Moenia in Naples is connected with the Catacombs of San Gennaro, the largest Christian catacomb complex in southern Italy. The first structure was probably the result of the fusion of two ancient burial sites, one from the 2nd century CE that contained the remains of Saint Agrippinus, and the site from the 4th century that contained the remains of Januarius.

In 1744, Cardinal Giuseppe Spinelli, archbishop of Naples, conducted a search for Agrippinus' relics. He found a marble vase with the following words written: "Indeterminate relics that are believed to be the body of Saint Agrippinus."

His relics are enshrined under the high altar of the cathedral of Naples with the bodies of Saints Eutychius and Acutius, who were companions of Saint Januarius.

Stefano Pozzi painted an oil painting called SS Januarius and Agrippino Driving out the Saracens.
