= Sossius =

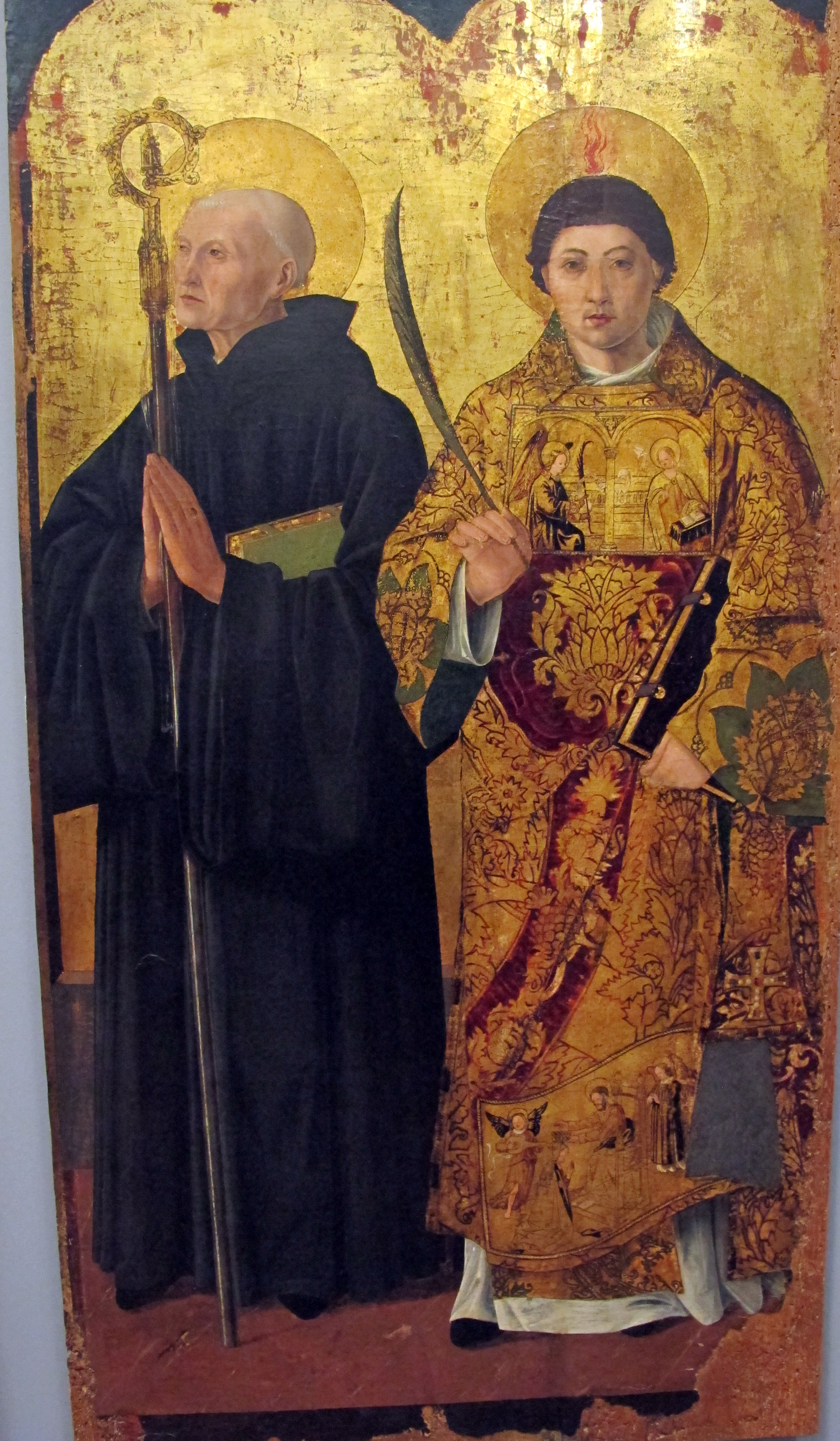
- Saint Sossius (right) with Saint Severinus, altar painting from the eponymous Church of Santi Severino e Sossio in Naples, late 15th century
- Born: 275; Misenum, Italy
- Died: 19 September 305; Pozzuoli, Italy
- Major shrine: Basilica di San Sossio, Frattamaggiore
- Feast: 23 September
- Patronage: Frattamaggiore, San Sossio Baronia

Saint Sossius or Sosius (Italian: Sosso, Sossio or Sosio; 275 – 305 AD) was Deacon of Misenum, an important naval base of the Roman Empire in the Bay of Naples. He was martyred along with Saint Januarius at Pozzuoli during the Diocletian Persecutions. His feast day is September 23, the date, three days after his death, on which his corpse was translated to Misenum.

== Legend ==
The legend conserved in the Atti Bolognesi states that during the Diocletian persecutions, Januarius, bishop of Benevento, escaped from his see and traveled to Pozzuoli "incognito." However, his presence became known to Christians in the area, and Januarius maintained contact with Sossius, who was a deacon of Miseno, as well as the deacon Festus and the lector Desiderius.

Legend says Januarius, with whom he studied to become a priest, predicted the martyrdom of Sossius when he saw a luminous red light and a dove hover over his head while he read the gospel at mass.

Sossius was soon discovered to be a Christian by the local authorities and he was condemned by the judge Dragontius, who condemned him to be killed by wild bears in the local amphitheatre. Januarius, Festus, and Desiderius, on hearing of Sossius’ arrest, took a risk and visited him in prison at the sulphur mines of Pozzuoli, near the volcano of Solfatara.

The authorities discovered that these men were also Christians and they were thrown to the wild beasts as well, but as one modern account states, "...when the animals came near the Saints, they fell affectionately at their feet and refused to harm them.". They were then condemned to be beheaded, along with Sossius.

The deacon Proculus of Pozzuoli and the laymen Eutyches and Acutius protested this sentence while the other men were being led to their execution. As a result, these three were also decapitated with the others near the Solfatara, on September 19, 305.

== Veneration ==
His remains were first preserved at Misenum (today Miseno). After the destruction of the town by the Saracens, its population transferred to the newly founded town of Frattamaggiore. They brought the saint's cult with them, making Sossius patron saint of the town; his relics, however, they left behind. The Benedictines recovered the relics from Miseno and preserved them at the convent of Santi Severino e Sossio, Naples in 910. John the Deacon wrote a history of St. Januarius and his companions, in which as an eyewitness he describes the aforesaid transfer.

From here his veneration spread through various parts of Campania and Lazio, and even to Africa. Following the Napoleonic suppression of the convent, the remains were translated to Frattamaggiore where they are still preserved in the basilica dedicated to him.

A village in the province of Avellino was established in his name as San Sossio Baronia.
