= Quodvultdeus =

Italian-Tunisian saint

Saint Quodvultdeus
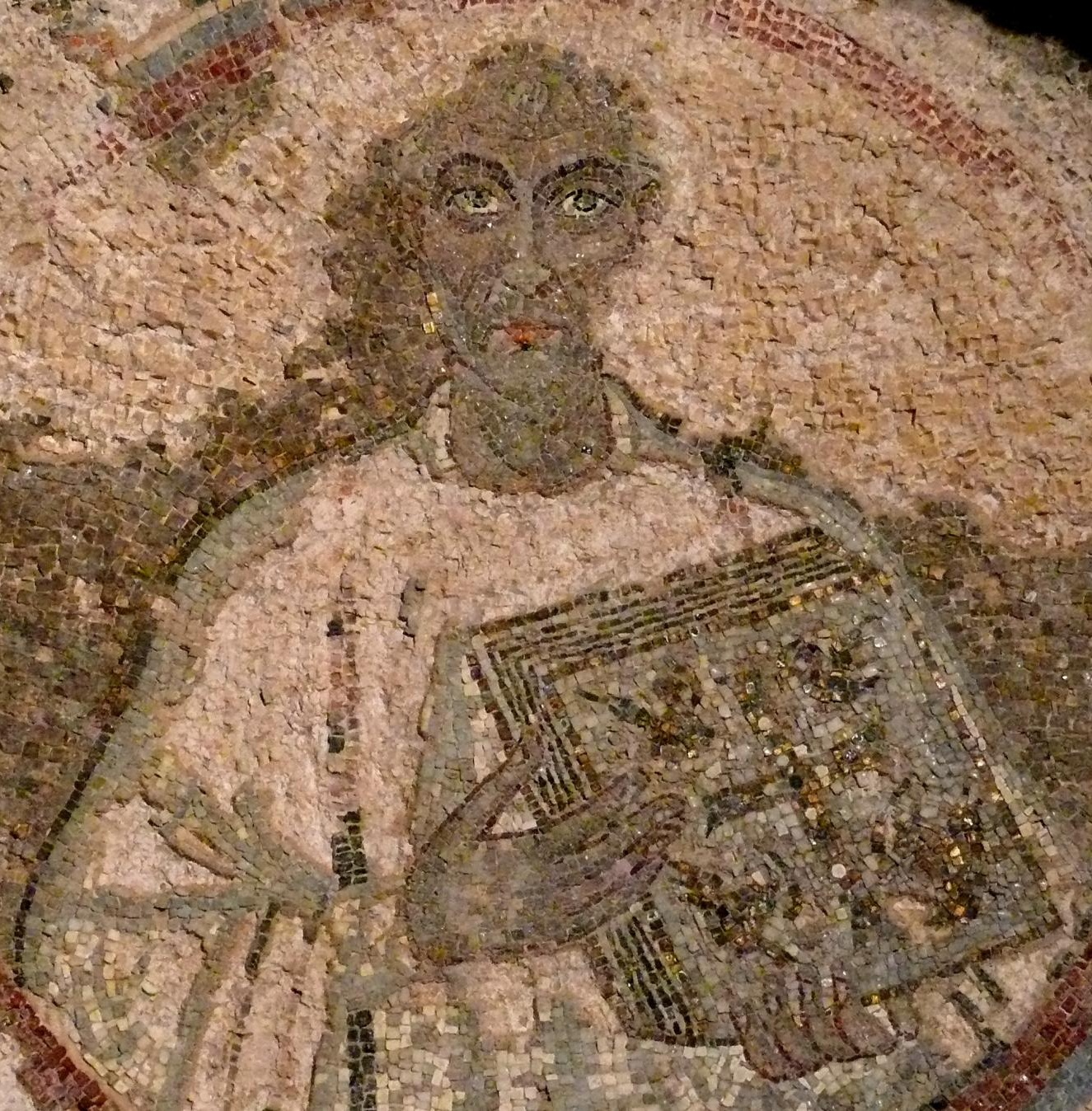
- Portrait of Quodvultdeus, 5th-century mosaic, Catacombs of San Gennaro

Church Father and Bishop of Carthage
- Died: ~450 AD; Neapolis, Western Roman Empire
- Venerated in: Roman Catholic Church; Eastern Orthodox Church
- Feast: 26 October (Roman calendar); 8 January (calendar of Carthage); 19 February (calendar of Naples, Eastern Orthodox)

Quodvultdeus (Latin for "what God wills", died c. 450 AD) was a fifth-century Church Father and Bishop of Carthage who was exiled to Naples. He was known to have been living in Carthage around 407 and became a deacon in 421 AD. He corresponded with Augustine of Hippo, who served as Quodvultdeus' spiritual teacher. Augustine also dedicated some of his writings to Quodvultdeus.

Quodvultdeus was exiled when Carthage was captured by the Vandals led by King Gaiseric, who followed Arianism. Tradition states that he and other churchmen (such as Gaudiosus of Naples) were loaded onto leaky ships that landed at Naples around 439 AD and Quodvultdeus established himself in Italy. He would go on to convert dozens of Arian Goths to the Catholic Christian faith during his lifetime.

One of the mosaic burial portraits in the Galleria dei Vescovi in the Catacombs of San Gennaro depicts Quodvultdeus.

== Writings ==
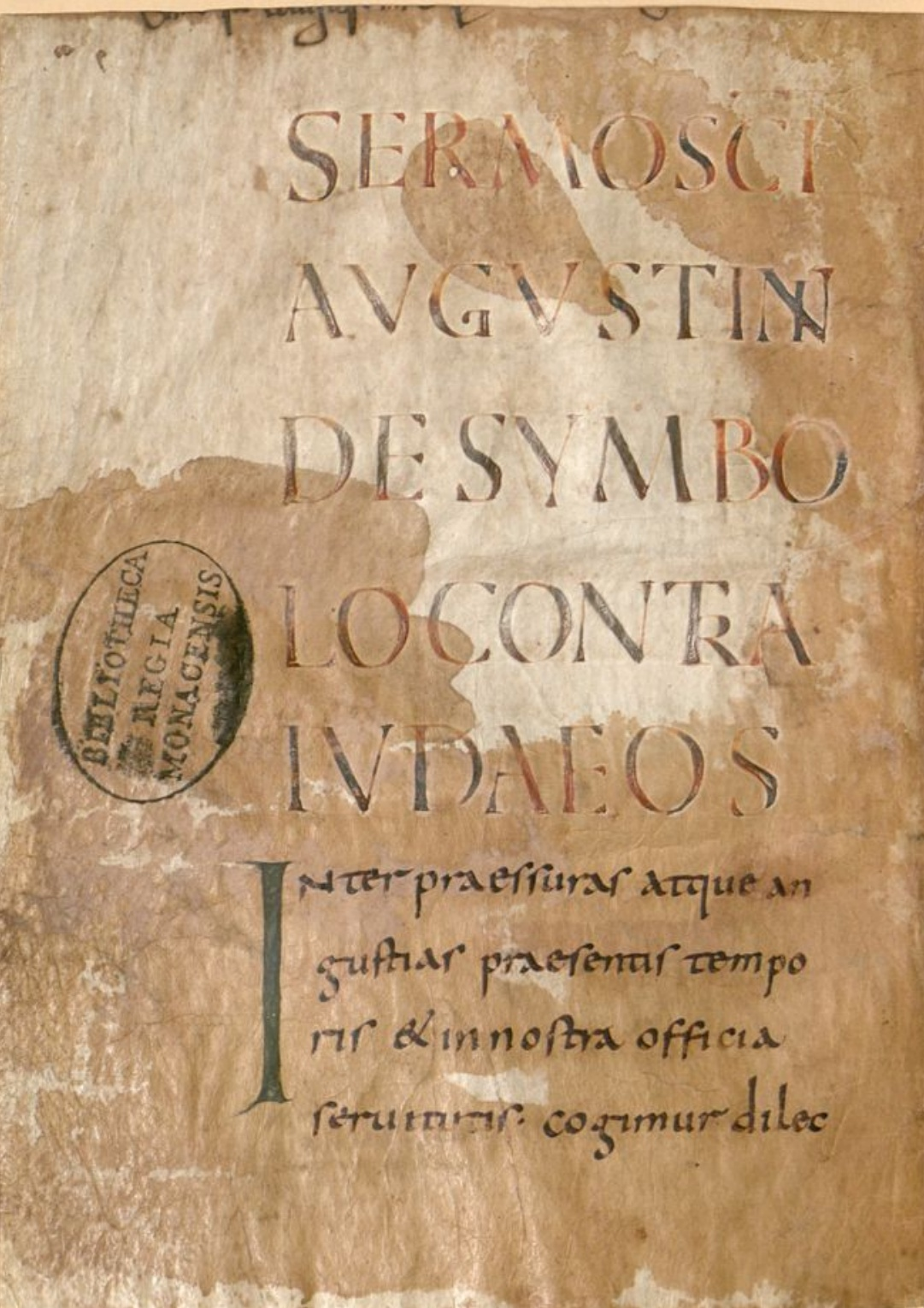
Opening page of a 9th-century manuscript of the Sermon against Jews, Pagans and Arians by Quodvultdeus, erroneously attributed to Augustine of Hippo (Bavarian State Library Clm 14098, f. 61v)

None of the surviving writings by Quodvultdeus were transmitted under his name. While Liber promissionum et praedicatorum Dei was attributed to Prosper of Aquitaine already in the 6th century, Quodvultdeus's sermons are known through Augustinian collections. In 1914 Germain Morin was the first to suppose that 12 sermons by Pseudo-Augustine were actually written by Quodvultdeus. In 1920 Desiderius Franses showed this hypothesis to be highly plausible.

=== List of writings ===
- Liber promissionum et praedicatorum Dei ("Book of promises and predictions of God")
- Thirteen sermons:
1. Contra iudaeos, paganos et arrianos ("Against Jews, Pagans and Arians")
2. Adversus quinque haereses ("On five heresies")
3. De symbolo I ("On the creed I")
4. De symbolo II ("On the creed II")
5. De symbolo III ("On the creed III")
6. De quattuor virtutibus caritatis ("On the four virtues of love")
7. De cantico novo ("On the new song")
8. De ultima quarta feria ("On the last Wednesday")
9. De cataclismo ("On the cataclysm")
10. De tempore barbarico I ("On barbaric times I")
11. De accedentibus ad gratiam I ("On the approach to grace I")
12. De accedentibus ad gratiam II ("On the approach to grace II")
13. De tempore barbarico II ("On barbaric times II")
- Two letters to Augustine (Ep. CCXXI and CCXXIII)

== Editions and Translations ==
- René Braun: Opera Quodvultdeo Carthagiensi Episcopo Tributa (CCSL 60). Brepols, Turnhout 1976.
- René Braun: Quodvultdeus. Livre des promesses et des prédictions de Dieu (SC 101-102). Éditions du Cerf, Paris 1964.
- Quodvultdeus of Carthage. The Creedal Homilies, translation and commentary by Thomas Macy Finn, 2004 (ACW 60). ISBN 9780809105724

== Bibliography ==
- Quodvultdeus of Carthage : The Creedal Homilies : conversion in fifth-century North Africa, Thomas Macy Finn (translation and commentary), New York : Newman Press, 2004, p. 137.
