= San Gennaro extra Moenia =

Church in Naples, Italy

Basilica of San Gennaro Beyond the Walls Basilica di San Gennaro extra Moenia (in Italian)
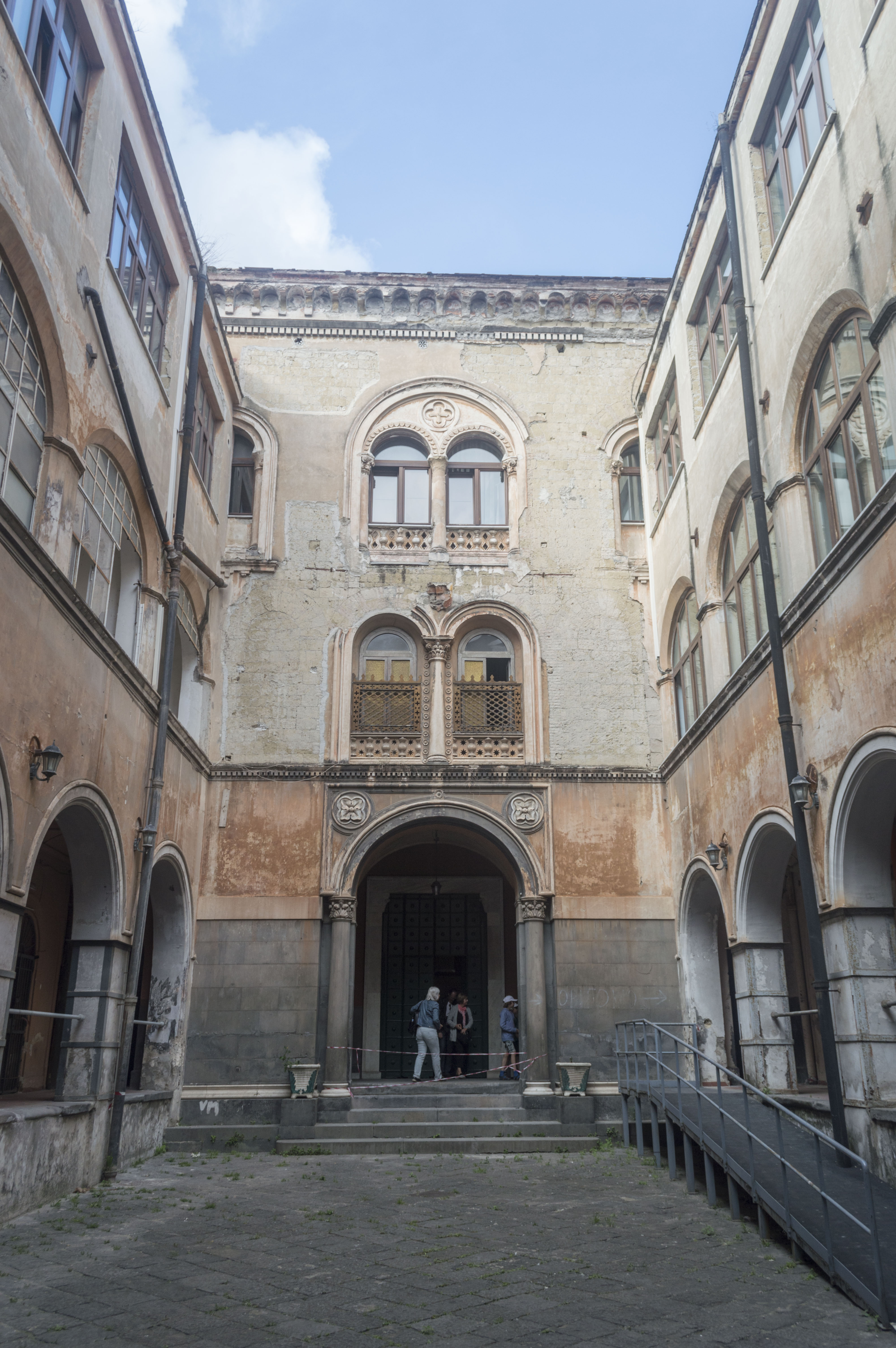
- Part of façade of San Gennaro extra Moenia.

Religion
- Affiliation: Roman Catholic
- Diocese: Archdiocese of Naples
- Ecclesiastical or organizational status: Minor basilica

Location
- Location: Naples, Campania, Italy
- Interactive map of Basilica of San Gennaro Beyond the Walls; Basilica di San Gennaro extra Moenia (in Italian)
- Coordinates: 40.86392°N 14.246425°E

Architecture
- Type: Church

San Gennaro extra Moenia ("San Gennaro Beyond the Walls") is a church in Naples, Italy. It is located in the Rione Sanita on the large road that leads up to the Capodimonte museum and is an example of so-called paleo-Christian architecture in the city.

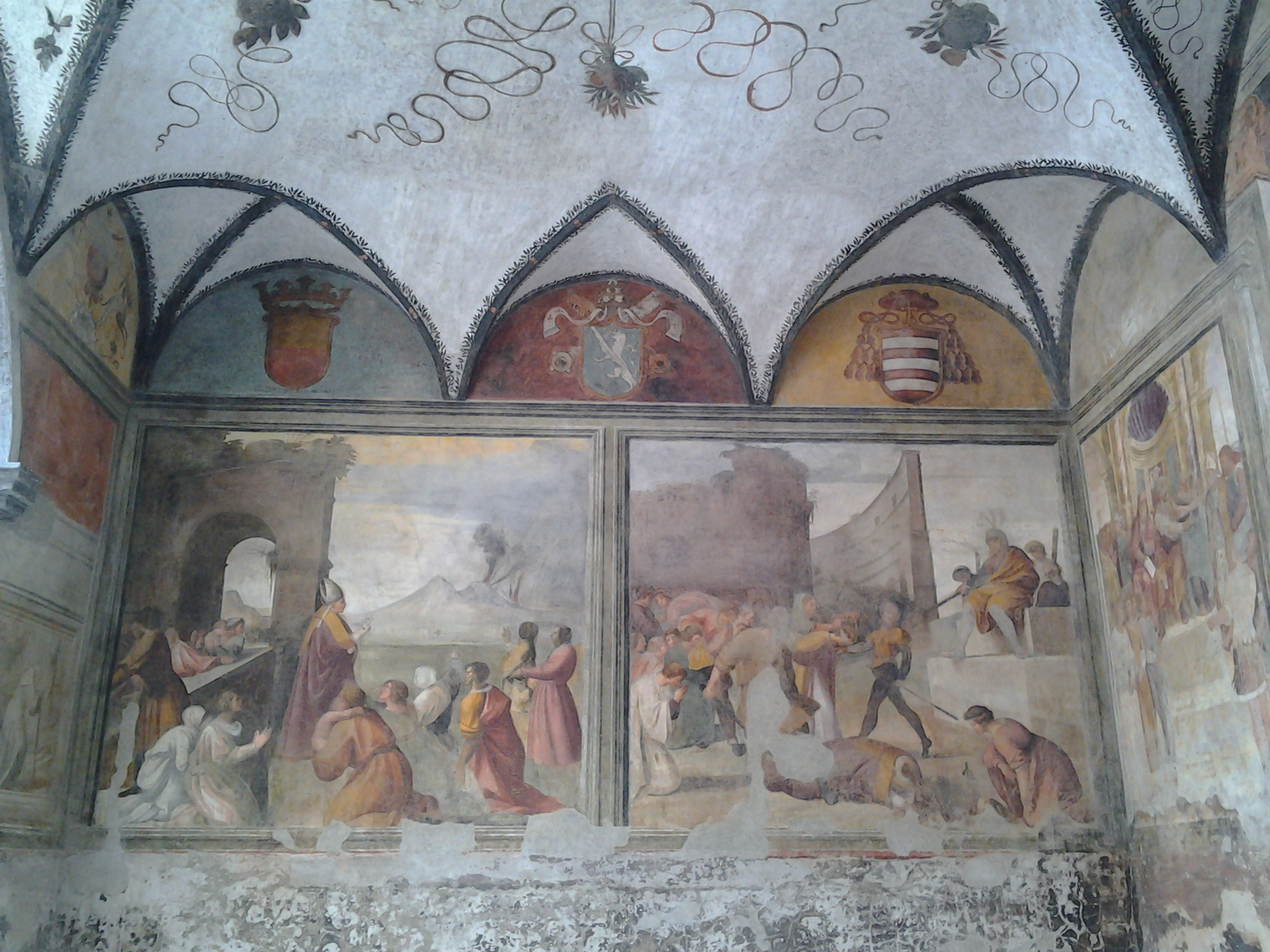
Frescoes in the entrance to atrium

The foundation of the church is connected with the Catacombs of San Gennaro, the largest Christian catacomb complex in southern Italy. The first structure was probably the result of the fusion of two ancient burial sites, one from the 2nd century CE that contained the remains of Saint Agrippinus of Naples, the first patron saint of Naples, and the site from the 4th century CE that contained the remains of San Gennaro, the now traditional patron saint of the city.

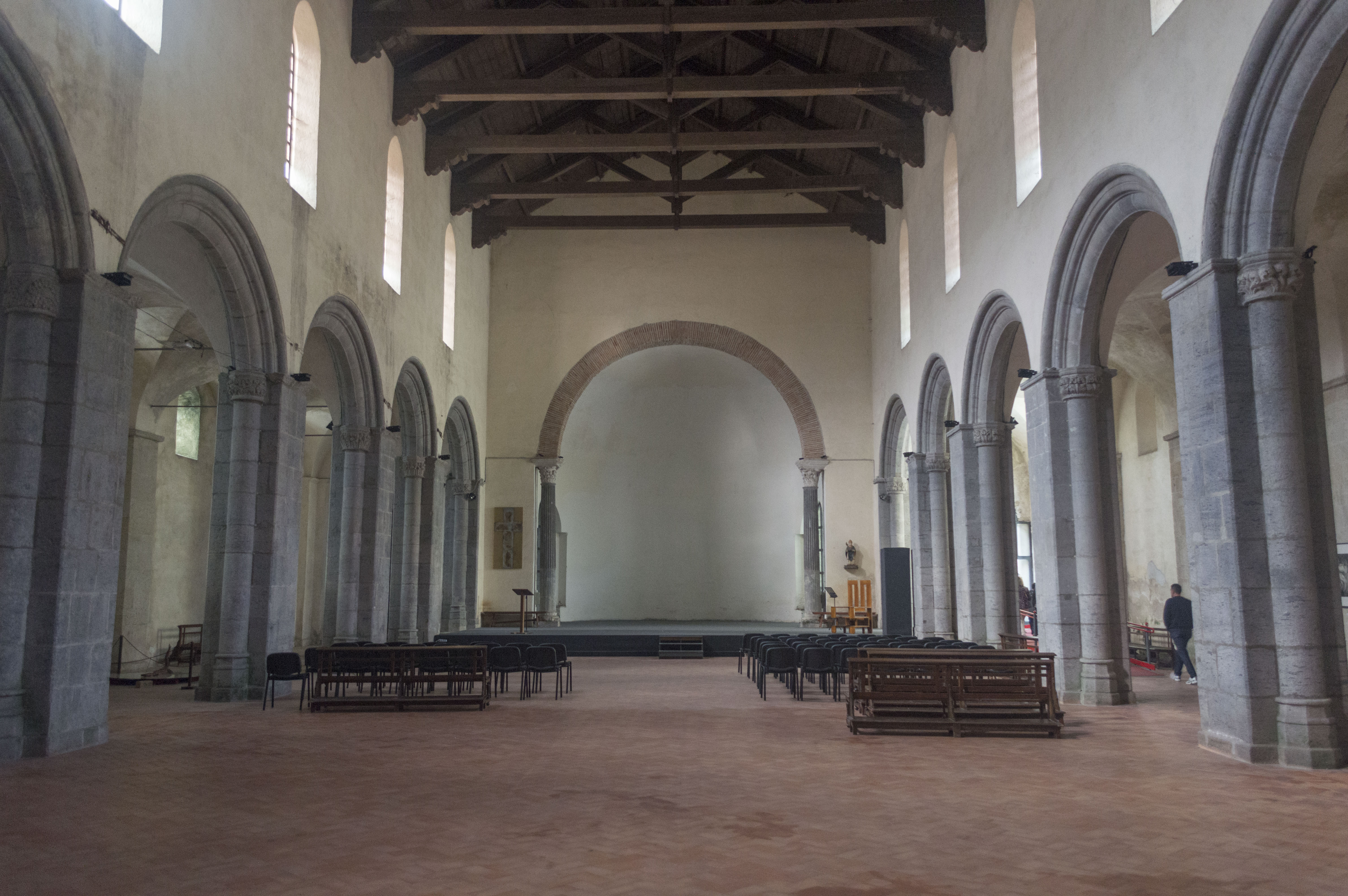
Interior

This ancient basilica was then reformed in the fourth century AD and expanded between the 11th and 15th centuries. The church became a hospital in 1648. The church is still contained within the complex of the larger hospital structure. The premises provide access to the extensive catacombs themselves.
