= Proculus of Pozzuoli =

Christian martyr

Saint Proculus of Pozzuoli
- Died: c. 305 AD; Solfatara
- Venerated in: Roman Catholic Church; Eastern Orthodox Church
- Feast: October 18 (Proculus, Eutyches, Acutius), November 16 (Proculus) (both feast days Roman Catholic Church); April 21; September 19 (both feast days Eastern Orthodox Church)

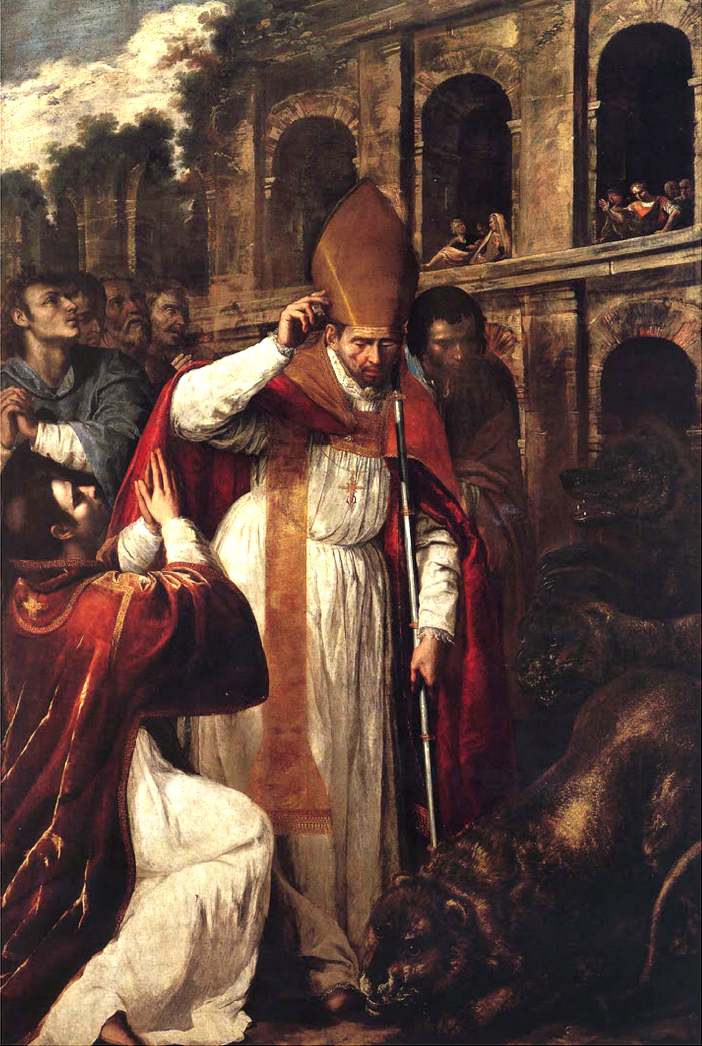
The Martyrdom of St Januarius in the Amphitheatre at Pozzuoli.jpg

Saint Proculus (Proclus) of Pozzuoli (Italian: San Procolo) was martyred around 305 AD, according to Christian tradition, at the same time as Saint Januarius.

He was martyred with:

- Sossius or Sosius, deacon of Miseno (Italian: Sosso, Sossio)
- Festus, lector (Italian: Festo)
- Desiderius, lector (Italian: Desiderio)
- Acutius (Italian: Acuzio)
- Eutyches (Eutychius) (Italian: Eutiche)

These seven martyrs are first mentioned in relation to the life of Saint Januarius. The martyrs' relics were translated at various times and to various destinations. Early documents, including the Atti Puteolani and the Acta s. Proculi were kept at the Archivio della Curia of Pozzuoli before being published for the first time in 1867 in Paris by the Jesuit Bollandist Stilting.

In addition, the Atti Bolognesi, conserved in a codex dating from 1180, also provides information about these martyrs; this codex was kept at the Celestine monastery of Santo Stefano in Bologna. The codex contains the legend of Proculus, based on earlier accounts dating from at least the seventh century.

== Legend ==
The legend conserved in the Atti Bolognesi states that during the Diocletianic Persecution, Januarius, bishop of Benevento, escaped from his see and traveled to Pozzuoli "incognito." However, his presence became known to Christians in the area, and Januarius maintained contact with a deacon of Miseno, Sossius, as well as the deacon Festus and the lector Desiderius.

Sossius was soon discovered to be a Christian by the local authorities and he was condemned by the judge Dragontius, who condemned him to be killed by wild bears in the local amphitheater. Januarius, Festus, and Desiderius, on hearing of Sossius’ arrest, took a risk and visited him in prison at the sulphur mines of Pozzuoli, near the volcano of Solfatara.

The authorities discovered that these men were also Christians and they were thrown to the wild beasts as well, but as one modern account states, "[...] when the animals came near the Saints, they fell affectionately at their feet and refused to harm them." They were then condemned to be beheaded, along with Sossius.

The deacon Proculus and the laymen Eutyches and Acutius protested this sentence while the other men were being led to their execution. As a result, these three were also decapitated with the others near the Solfatara, on September 19, 305.

== Veneration ==
The relics of Proculus were first buried in the Calpurnian temple, which was later converted into the cathedral of Pozzuoli.

The bodies of Festus and Desiderius were buried outside Benevento, then translated to the cathedral of that city before being buried in the abbey of Montevergine.

The relics of Sossius were buried in Miseno. When Miseno was destroyed in the 9th century, his relics were moved to Naples and then in 1807 taken to the city of Frattamaggiore, and became a patron saint of that city. There is a church dedicated to him in Miseno. Saint-Sozy, in France, takes its name from Sossius.

The relics of Eutyches and Acutius were kept at the praetorium Falcidii near the Paleochristian basilica of Santo Stefano in Puzzuoli. In the second half of the eighth century, they were placed in Naples Cathedral, under the high altar of the cathedral in Naples with the relics of Agrippinus, a bishop of Naples.

According to a ninth-century document believed by one scholar to be a fictitious account, the bodies of Januarius, Proculus, Eutyches, and Acutius were transported in 871 to Reichenau Island by a Swabian knight. The relics were subject to various inspections throughout the centuries, and in 1964, the bones at Reichenau were determined to be fake and not associated with these Italian martyrs.

Desiderius and Acutius are depicted in a 9th-century fresco in the Catacombs of San Gennaro, in Naples.

== Feast days ==
Ancient dates in the Roman Martyrology are as follows: the feast day for the whole group was formerly September 19, the same feast day as for Januarius; Festus and Desiderius were celebrated on September 7; Sossius on September 23; Proculus, Eutyches, and Acutius, on October 18. November 16 was the official feast day for Saint Proculus in Pozzuoli. St. Proculus was affectionately nicknamed 'o pisciasotto ("the pants-pisser") because November 16 was often a day of rain. The townspeople also celebrated his feast on the second Sunday in May.
