= Gaudiosus of Naples =

Bishop of Abitina

Saint Gaudiosus of Naples
- Died: ~455 AD
- Venerated in: Roman Catholic Church; Eastern Orthodox Church
- Feast: 27 October

Gaudiosus of Naples or Gaudiosus the African (Latin: Sanctus Gaudiosus Africanus) was a bishop of Abitina, a village near Carthage in present-day western Tunisia, in the Roman Africa Province.

Born Septimius Celius Gaudiosus, he fled North Africa during the persecutions of Genseric, king of the Vandals, by boat and arrived at Naples with other exiled churchmen, including the bishop of Carthage, who was named Quodvultdeus. Arriving around 439 AD, he established himself on the acropolis of Naples.

The introduction of the Augustinian Rule into Naples is attributed to him as well as the introduction of some relics, including those of Restituta.

Gaudiosus' relics were later buried in the Catacombs of San Gennaro in the 6th century. One of the cemeteries of these catacombs, San Gaudioso, refers to Gaudiosus.
