= Museo del Tesoro di San Gennaro =

Museum in Naples

Museum of the Treasure of San Gennaro
- Museo del Tesoro di San Gennaro
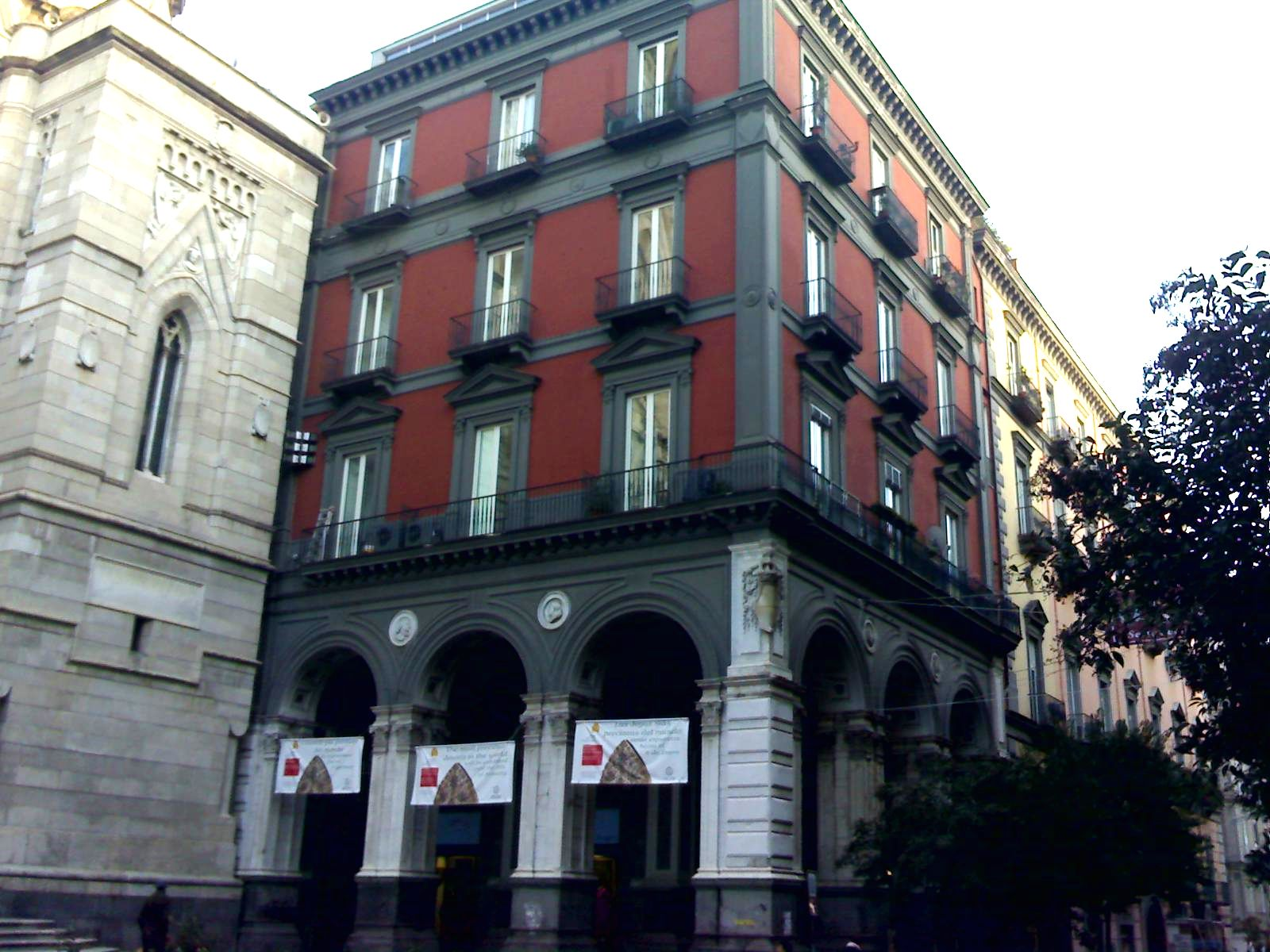
- Main entrance
- Established: 2003
- Location: Via Duomo, 149, Naples, Italy
- Coordinates: 40°51′08″N 14°15′34″E
- Type: religious artifacts
- Website: museosangennaro.it

The Museo del Tesoro di San Gennaro is a museum of religious relics in Naples, in Campania in southern Italy.

It was opened in December 2003.

The collection includes a large number of ex votos as well as silver and gold objects, paintings, bronze busts and an eighteenth-century gilded litter which was formerly used to carry the effigy of St. Januarius in processions.

== See also ==
- Royal Chapel of the Treasure of St. Januarius
