= Severus of Naples =

Saint Severus of Naples
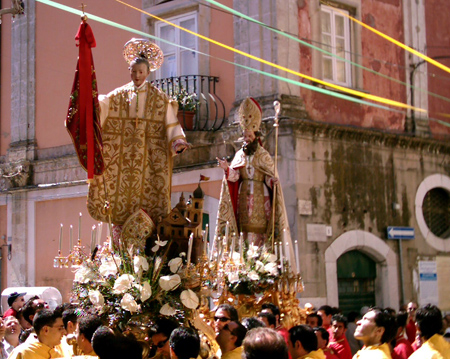
- Statues of Saint Severinus and Saint Severus (right), carried during a procession at San Severo.

Bishop
- Died: April 29, 409; Naples
- Venerated in: Roman Catholic Church, Eastern Orthodox Church
- Feast: April 29
- Patronage: San Severo (Foggia)

Saint Severus (Italian: San Severo di Napoli) (died 409) was a bishop of Naples during the 4th and 5th centuries. He is considered the eleventh legitimate Catholic bishop of Naples, and the twelfth overall, succeeding Maximus. His episcopate ran from February 363 to April 29, 409, the traditional date of his death. Between the episcopates of Maximus and Severus, Zosimus, an Arian was established as Bishop, who was condemned as heretical by the Catholic Church.

Severus was a friend of Saint Ambrose, whom he met at council at Capua in 392.

To Severus is attributed the construction of the Battistero di San Giovanni in Fonte, associated with the basilica of Santa Restituta.

Severus also built outside of the city walls the Basilica of San Fortunato, to which he translated the relics of his predecessor Maximus.

To Severus is also attributed the first translation of the body of St. Januarius from Pozzuoli to Naples, which occurred in 367. According to an early hagiography, Januarius' relics were transferred by order of Severus to the Neapolitan catacombs extra moenia.

== Veneration ==
His relics were translated from the Battistero di Napoli to the district known as Rione Sanità in the 9th century, to what became known as the Catacombs of San Severo. In 1310, Archbishop Umberto d’Ormont (Uberto d'Ormont), who had served as abbot of the Basilica of San Severo, placed Severus' relics in the main altar of San Severo, and had built a marble ciborium, which has been attributed to Tino da Camaino.

The Marble Calendar of Naples, sculpted in the ninth century and preserved in the Cathedral of Naples, lists Severus under the feast day of April 29 –the date that appears in the Roman Martyrology.

A legendary Vita, written in the eleventh century, states that Severus brought a dead man back to life after the man's widow and children had been left destitute. The facts are these: a man of Naples one day went to a bathing establishment and forgot to take with him the usual fee for the proprietor: an egg (Sabine Baring-Gould writes: “Or perhaps a piece of money which from its form may have been commonly called an egg, or ovum.”). The man promised to pay the bath-keeper back. Unfortunately, he died a few days later and the bath-keeper then demanded from the widow a large amount of money that he pretended the deceased man had owed him. A judge ordered that the woman and her children be sold into slavery since she could not pay. The widow appealed to Saint Severus for assistance. Severus declared, “The dead man himself shall give evidence.” The town was gathered together at the man's tomb and Severus asked the dead man to answer truthfully about how much he owed the bath-keeper. The corpse opened his eyes, and stood up, and said “I owe but one egg.” Then he fell back again. The crowd immediately attacked the bath-keeper, but Severus protected the man from further harm.
