= Catacombs of San Gennaro =

Underground burial and worship sites in Naples, Italy

Coordinates: 40°51′51″N 14°14′51″E

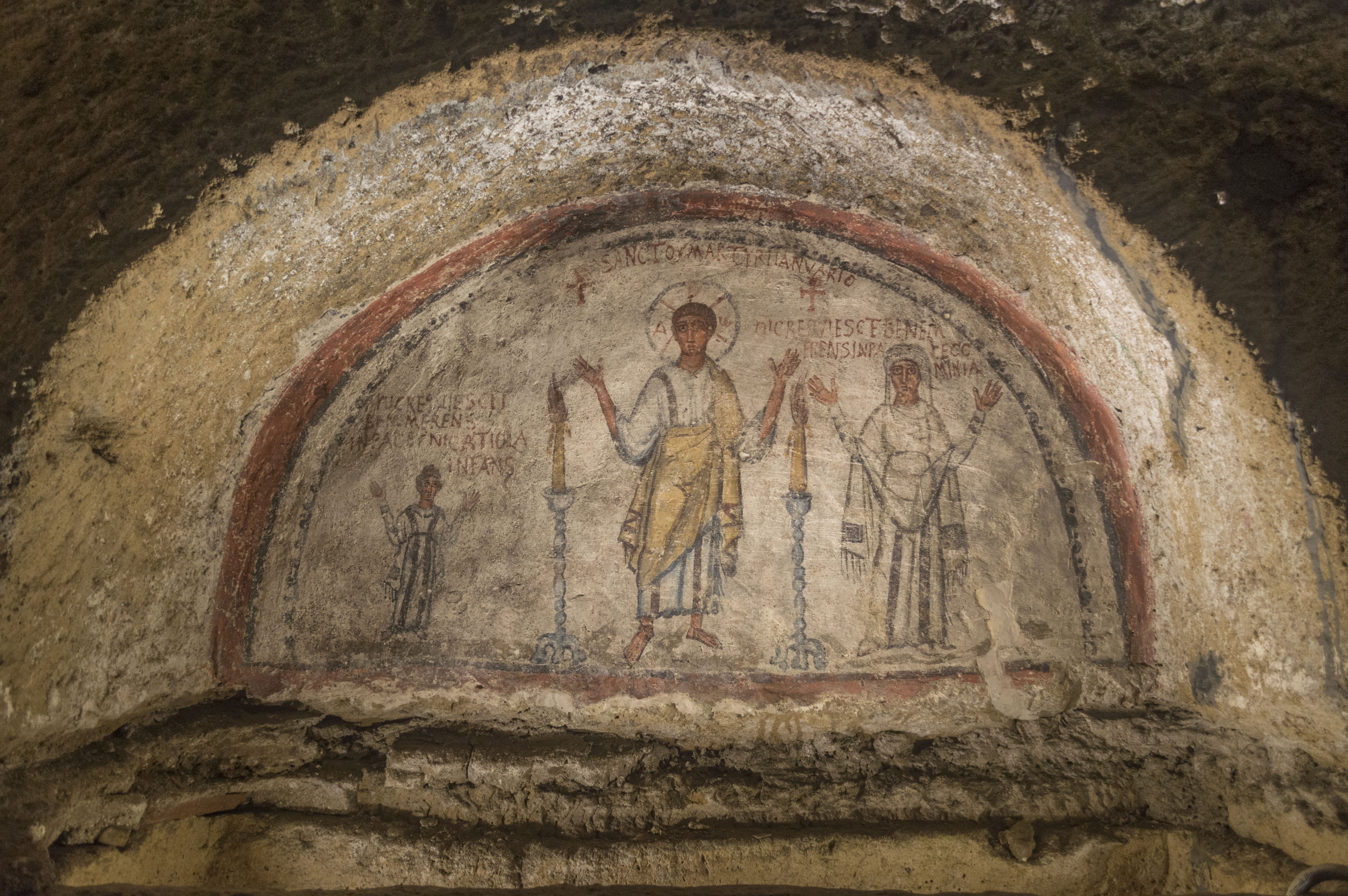
- Fresco with the portrait of San Gennaro
- Interactive map of Catacombs of San Gennaro

Details
- Established: 1985
- Location: Naples
- Country: Italy

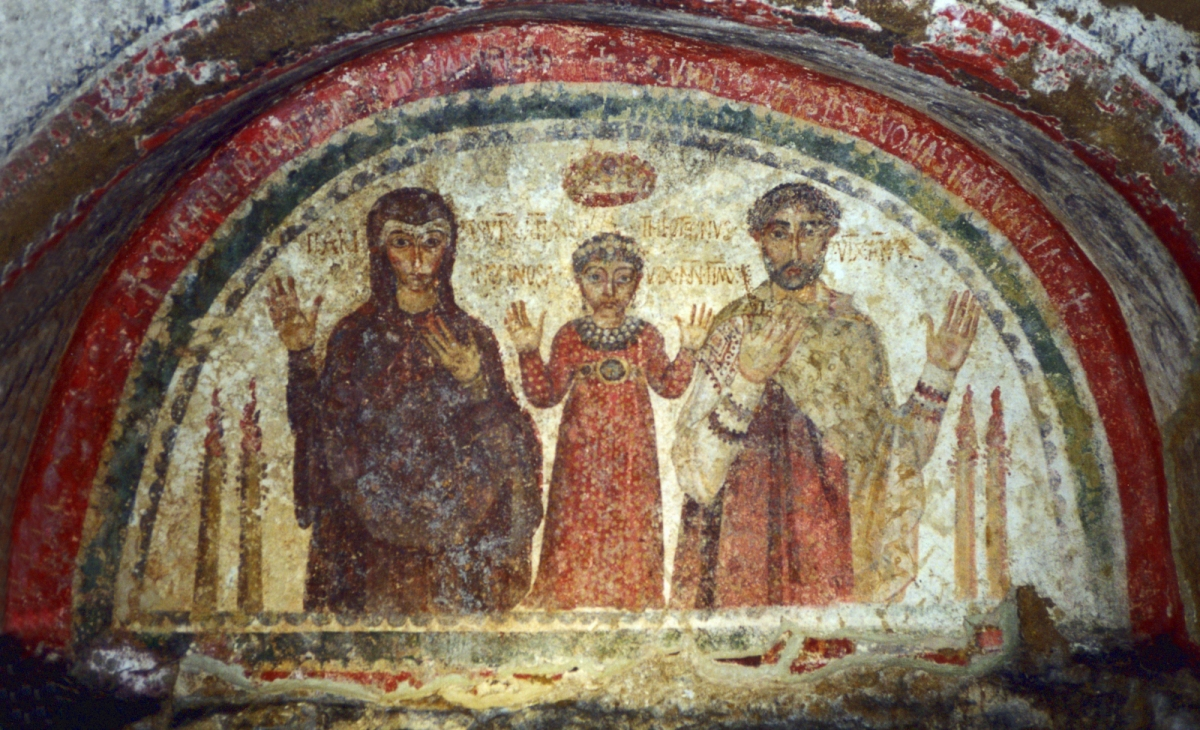
Fresco in the catacombs of San Gennaro

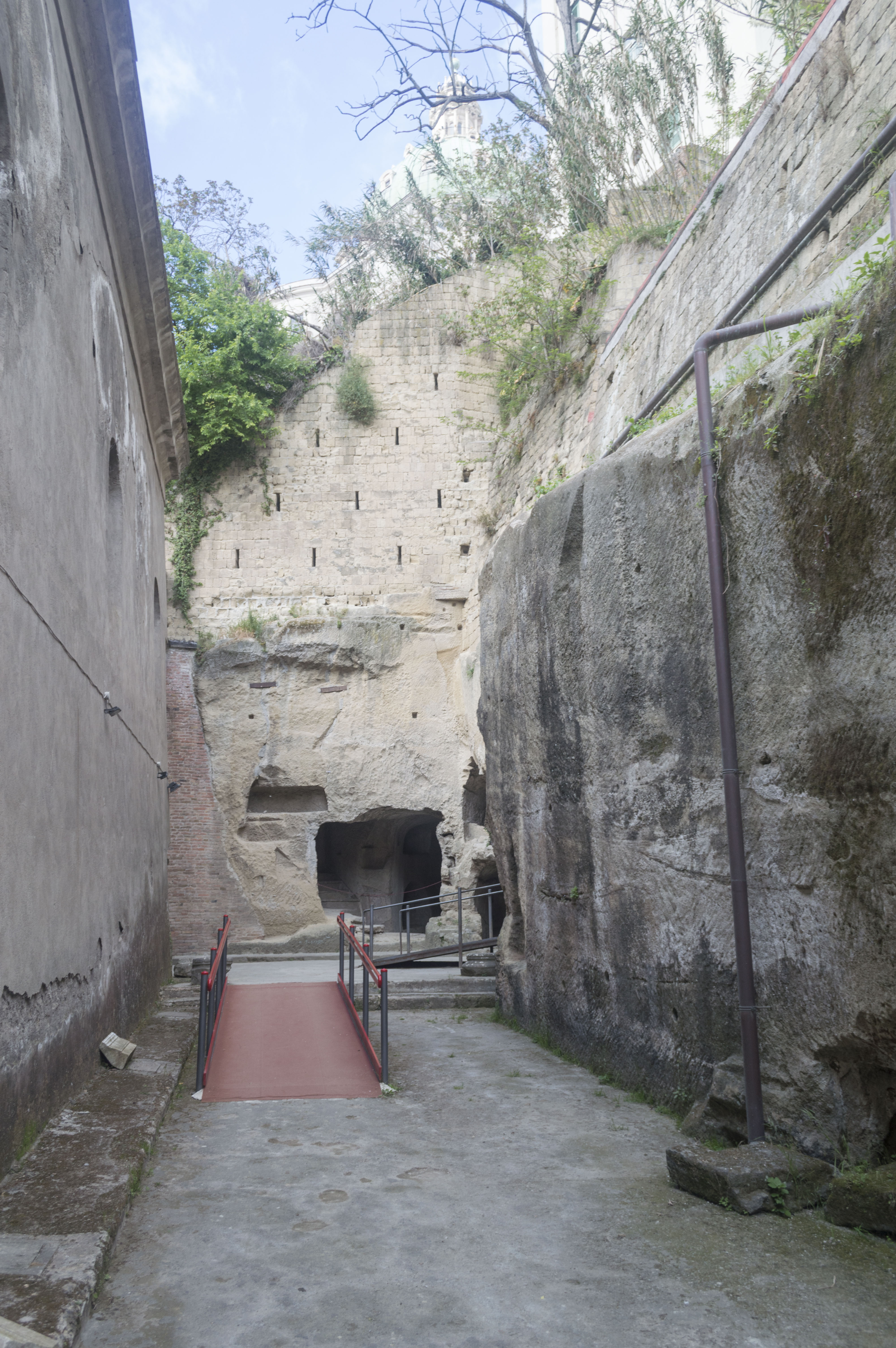
Entrance to Catacombs of San Gennaro

The Catacombs of San Gennaro are underground paleo-Christian burial and worship sites in Naples, Italy, carved out of tuff, a porous stone. They are situated in the northern part of the city, on the slope leading up to Capodimonte, consisting of two levels, San Gennaro Superiore, and San Gennaro Inferiore. The catacombs lie under the Rione Sanità neighborhood of Naples, sometimes called the "Valley of the Dead". The site is now easily identified by the large church of Madre del Buon Consiglio.

== History ==
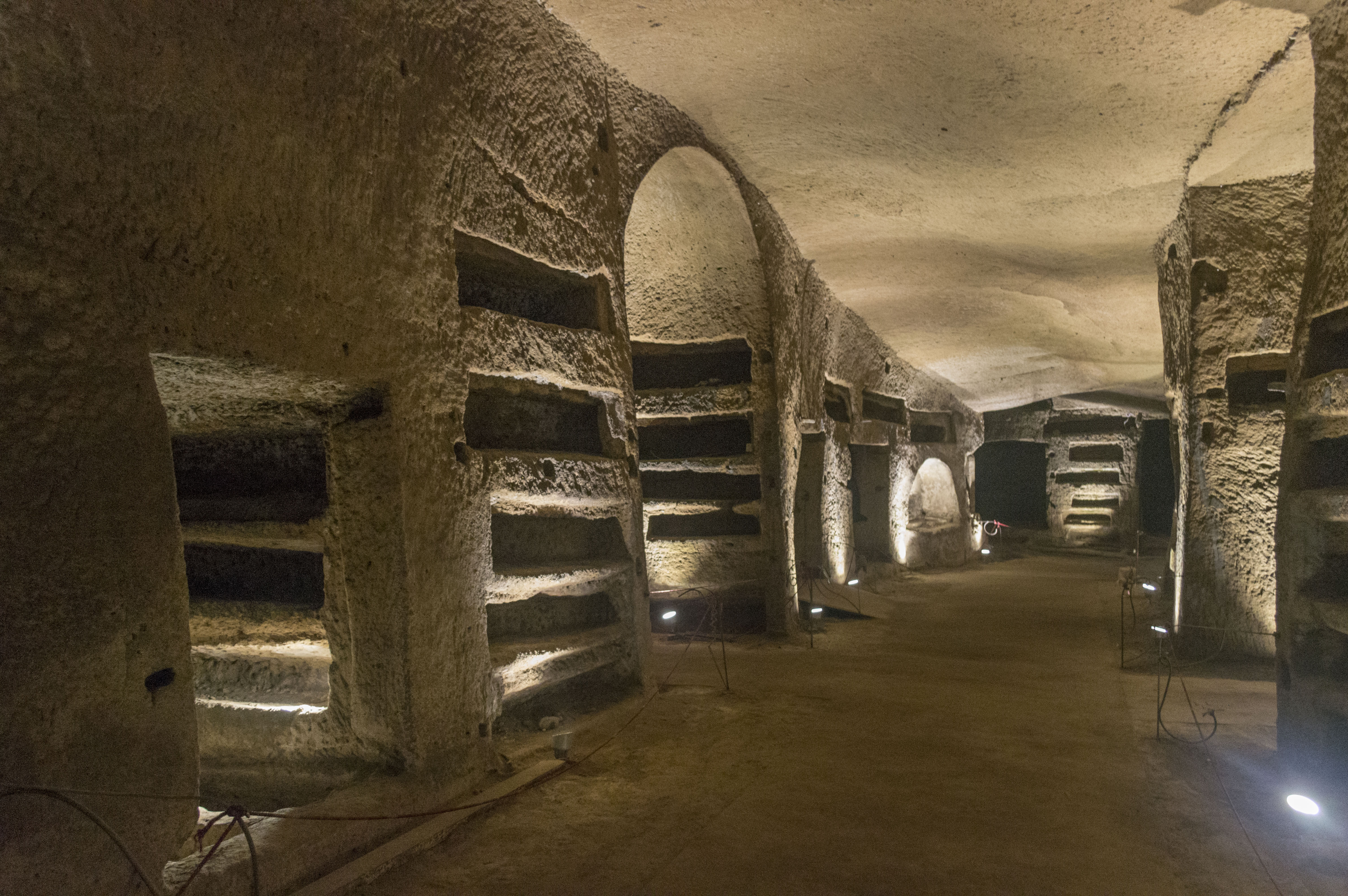
One of the halls with carved loculi.

Originally, there were three separate cemeteries, dedicated, respectively, to Saint Gaudiosus (San Gaudioso), Saint Severus (San Severo) and St. Januarius (San Gennaro). These catacombs in Naples are different from their Roman counterparts in that they have more spacious passageways along two levels. The lower level is the oldest, going back to the 3rd-4th century and may actually be the site of an earlier pre-Christian cemetery later ceded to the new sect. It apparently became an important religious burial site only after the entombment there of Bishop Agrippinus. The second level was the one expanded so as to encompass the other two adjacent cemeteries.

The foundation of San Gennaro extra Moenia is connected with the Catacombs of San Gennaro, the largest Christian catacomb complex in southern Italy. The first structure was probably the result of the fusion of two ancient burial sites, one from the 2nd century CE that contained the remains of Saint Agrippinus of Naples, the first patron saint of Naples, and the site from the 4th century CE that contained the remains of St. Januarius, the patron saint of the city.

The site was consecrated to Gennaro (Januarius) in the fifth century on the occasion of the entombment there of his remains, which were later removed to the Cathedral of Naples by Bishop John IV (842-849) in the 9th century. As the burial areas grew around the remains of Gennaro so did underground places of worship for the growing Christian faith. An early example of religious use of the catacombs is the Basilica of Agrippinus dating to the fourth century. An altar and chair are carved from the tuff creating a meeting place for worshipers. Other ritual spaces included a confessional, baptismal font, a carved tuff table used as a seat for a consignatorium (area for confirmation), or “oleorum” table for holy oils, and possibly, monastic and hermit cells.

Until the eleventh century the catacombs were the burial site of Neapolitan bishops, including Quodvoltdeus, the exiled bishop of Carthage who died in 450 AD. Between the 13th and 18th century, the catacombs were the victim of severe looting. Restoration of the catacombs was made possible only after the transfer of skeletal remains to another cemetery. During WWII the catacombs were used by the local population as a place of shelter. The Catacombs were reopened in 1969 by the Archbishop of Naples and modern excavations started in 1971.

== Types of burials ==
The types of tombs include loculi, arcosoli, pits dug in the ground, and less often, sarcophagi made of tuff, or recycled marble and stone from older graves. The loculi are aligned vertically and the most simple style of burial found in the catacombs but not indicative of the status of the deceased. Arcosoli, made for family funeral areas, are built into the walls of the galleries and cubicles and are more sophisticated than the loculi. Sometimes decorated with mosaics or frescoes, the burials may be stacked horizontally. This type of burial is often found in Sicilian catacombs as well, and can be described as a “Siracusa” burial and is often found in Greek areas of catacombs. Occasionally child burials are found in the bottom wall of the lunette, another example of the efficient use of space in the catacombs.

== Oil lamps ==
Approximately 200 oil lamps dating from late antiquity to the Middle Ages have been found in the catacombs. Included in the findings are 54 African red slip lamps. The oldest oil lamps found date back to the second half of the third century and were made in Naples.

== See also ==
- Catacombs of Rome
