= Flavian Amphitheater (Pozzuoli) =

Ancient Roman amphitheater in Pozzuoli, Italy

Coordinates: 40°49′33.13″N 14°7′30.28″E

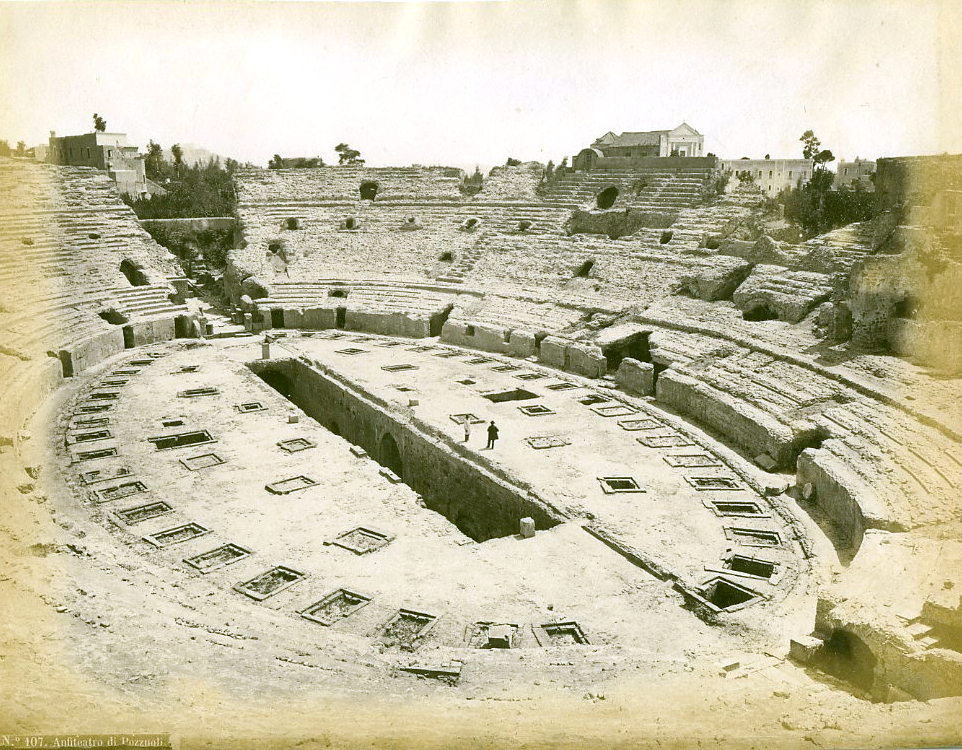
A late 19th-century photo of the Flavian Amphitheater

The Flavian Amphitheater (Italian: Anfiteatro Flavio Puteolano Italian pronunciation: [aɱfiteˈaːtro 'flaːvjo puteoˈlaːno]), located in Pozzuoli, is the third-largest Roman amphitheater in Italy. Only the Roman Colosseum and the Amphitheatre of Capua are larger. It was likely built by the same architects who previously constructed the Roman Colosseum. The name "Flavian Amphitheater" is primarily associated with the Roman Colosseum.

== History ==
It was begun under the reign of the emperor Vespasian and probably finished under the reign of his son Titus. The elliptical structure measures 147 by 117 meters (482 ft × 384 ft), with the arena floor measuring 72.22 by 42.33 meters (236.9 ft × 138.9 ft). The arena can hold up to 50,000 spectators. The interior is mostly intact and one can still see parts of gears, which were used to lift cages up to the arena floor. In 305, the arena was the setting for the persecutions of the patron saint of Pozzuoli, Saint Proculus, and the patron saint of Naples, Saint Januarius. After surviving being thrown to the wild beasts in the arena, the two were beheaded at the nearby Solfatara.

The Flavian Amphitheater is the second of two Roman amphitheaters built in Pozzuoli. The smaller and older amphitheater (Anfiteatro minore) has been almost totally destroyed by the construction of the Rome to Naples railway line. Only a dozen arches of this earlier work still exist. This lesser amphitheater measured 130 by 95 meters (427 ft × 312 ft).

The site of the structure was chosen at the nearby crossing of roads from Naples, Capua, and Cumae. It was abandoned when it was partially buried by eruptions from the Solfatara volcano. During the Middle Ages, the marble used on the exterior was stripped, but the interior was left alone and is perfectly preserved. Excavations of the site were performed 1839 to 1845, 1880 to 1882, and finally in 1947.

== Gallery ==
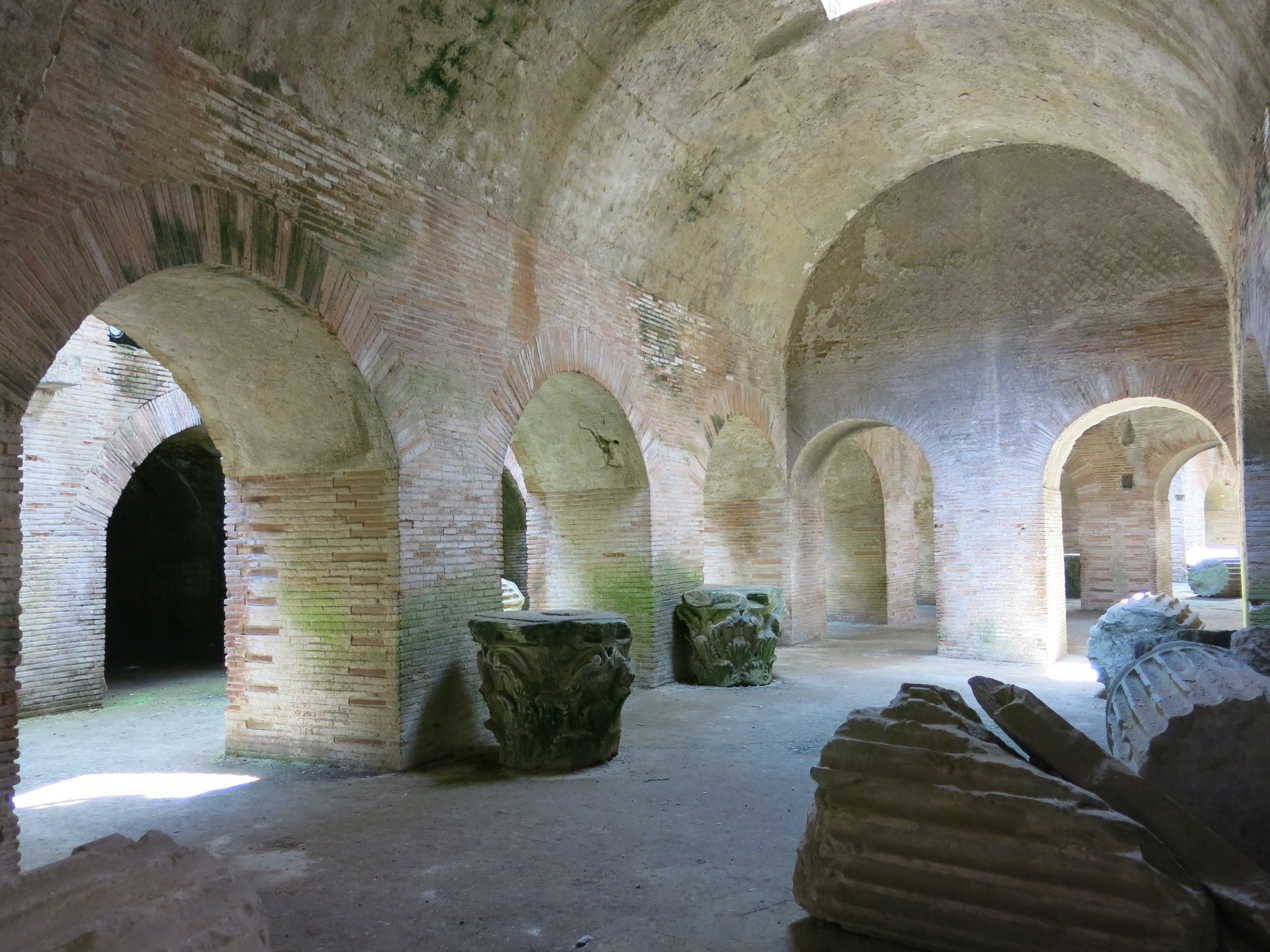

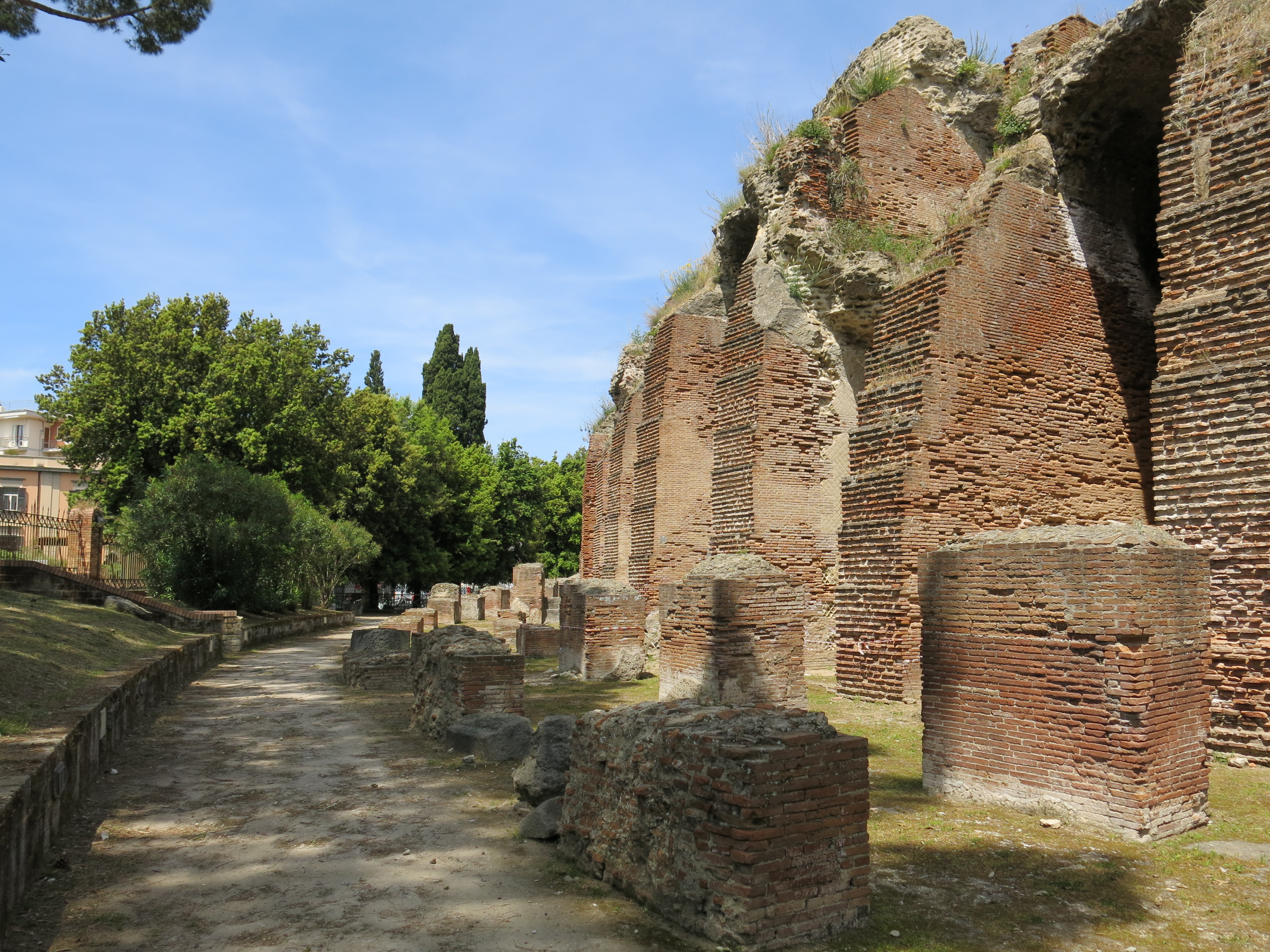

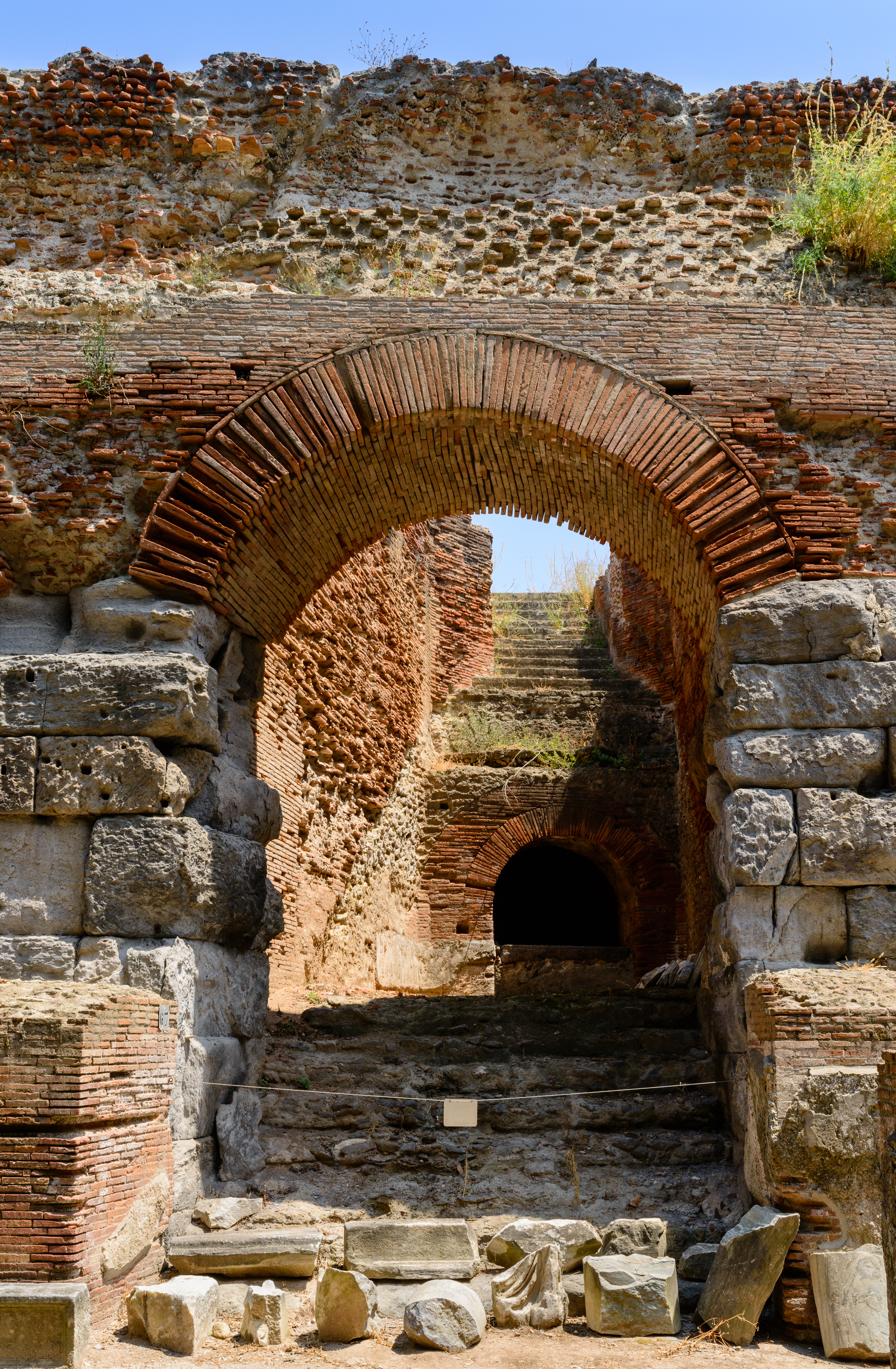

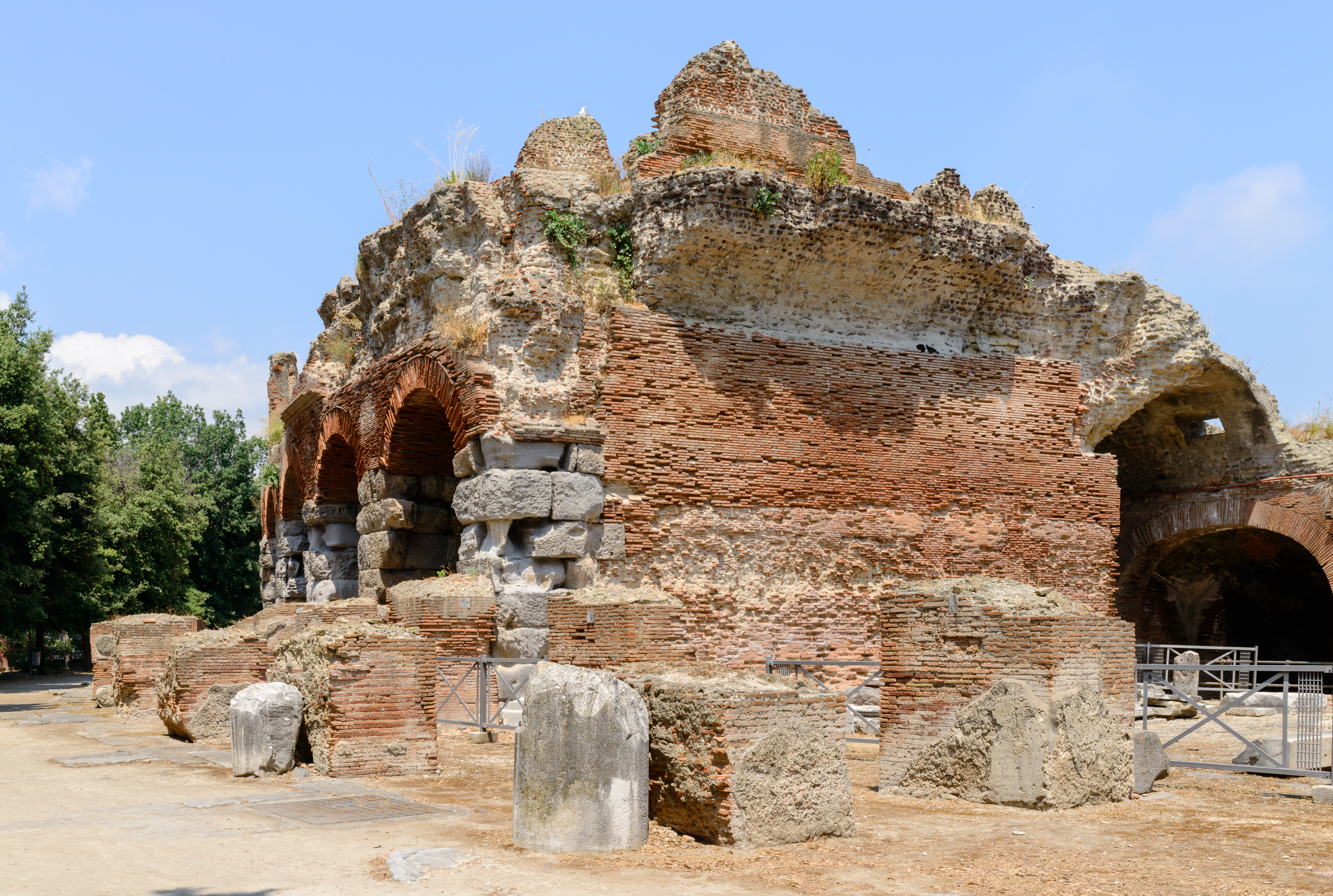

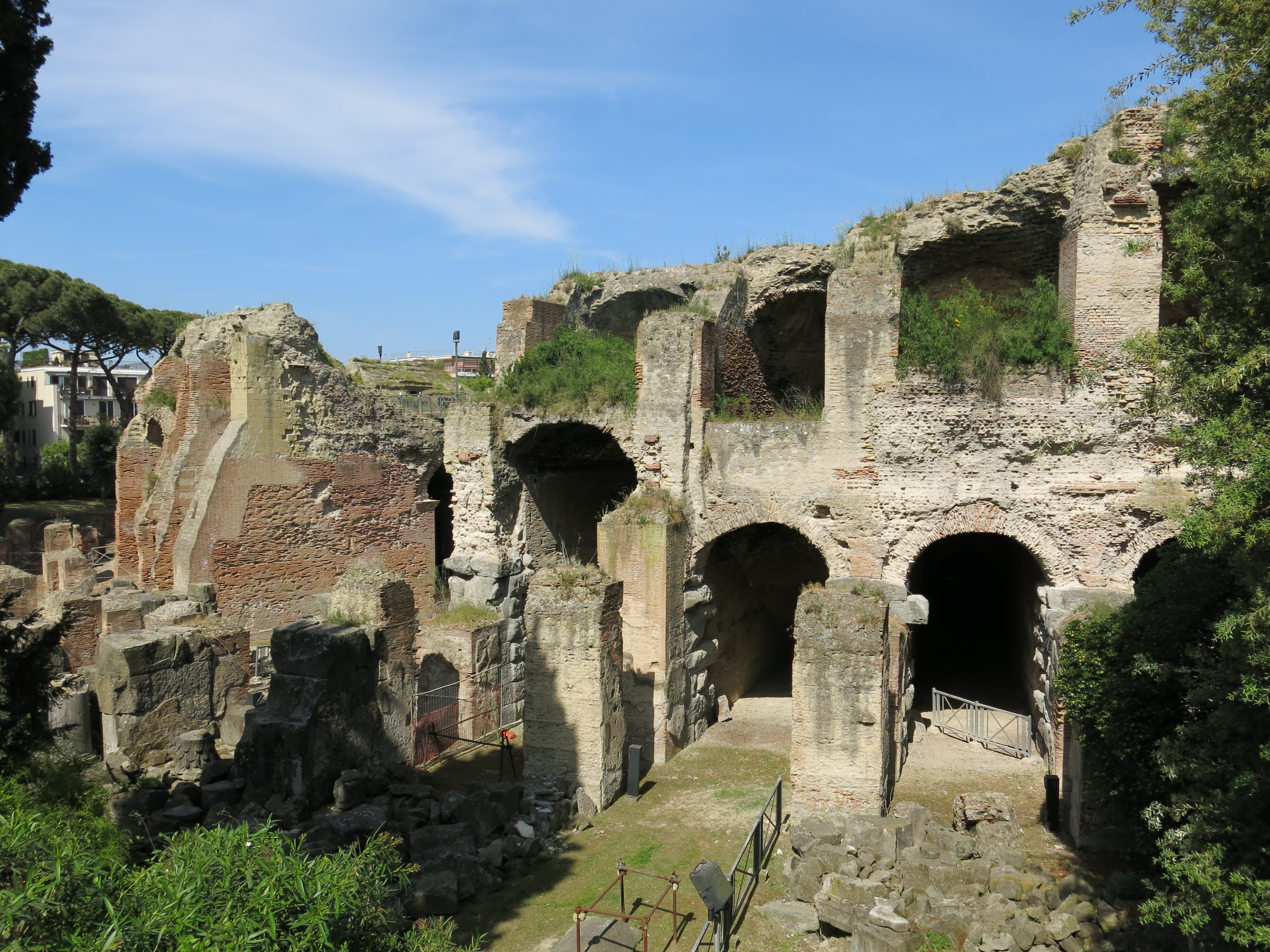

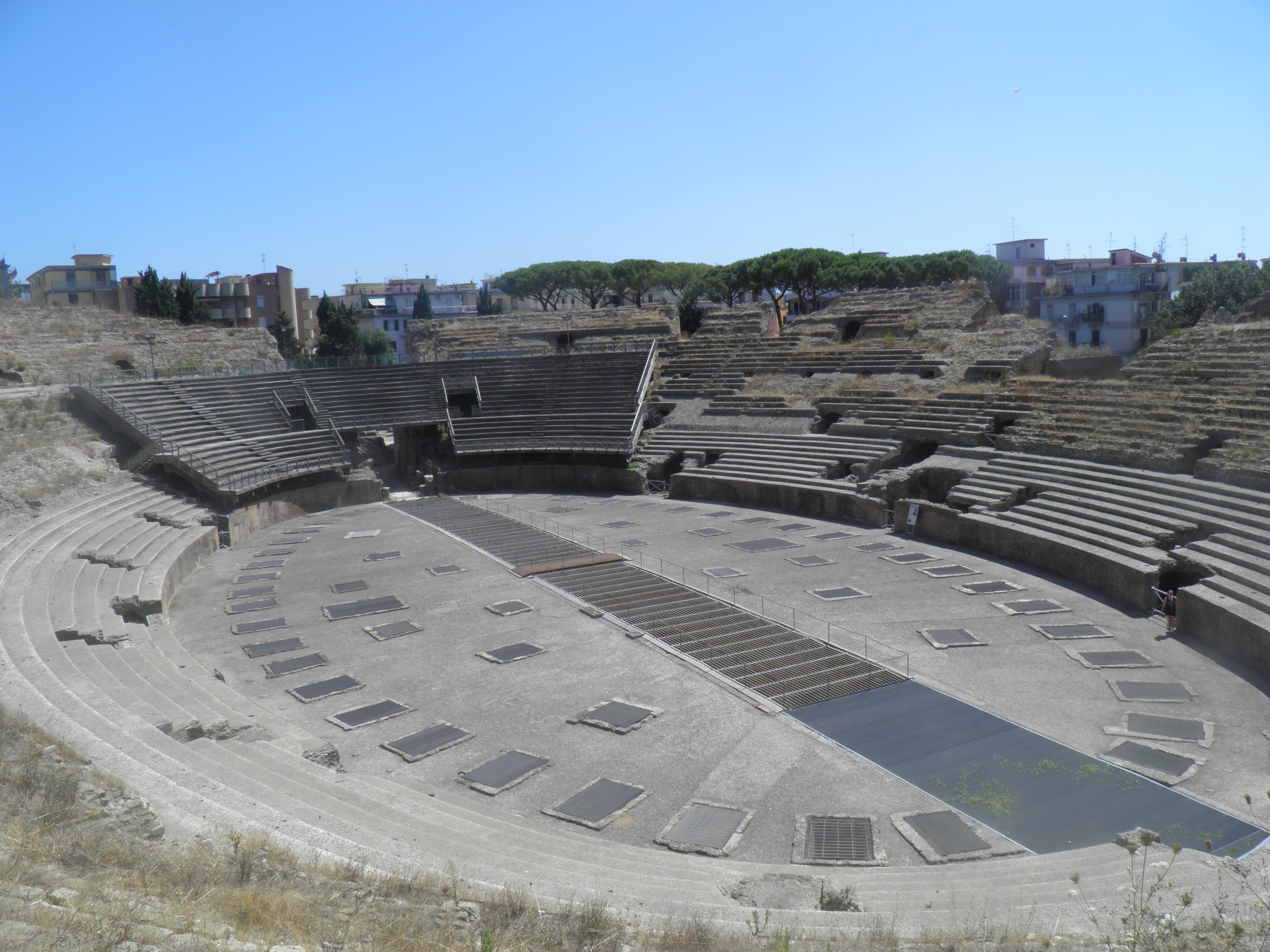

== See also ==
- List of Roman amphitheatres

== Sources ==
- Crimaco, Luigi et al. Da Puteoli a Pozzuoli : scavi e ricerche sulla rocca del Rione Terra, Naples : Electa Napoli, 2003. (OCLC 249530060)
- De Caro, Stefano and Greco, Angela. Campania, Rome-Bari : G. Laterza, 1983, pp. 37–53. (OCLC 34163741)
- Maiuri, Amedeo. Studi e ricerche sull'Anfiteatro Flavio Puteolano. Napoli : G. Macchiaroli, 1955. (OCLC 2078742)
- Maiuri, Amedeo. I Campi Flegrei, Rome : Istituto poligrafico dello stato, 1958, pp. 19–61. (OCLC 3744533)
- Maiuri, Amedeo. L’anfiteatro flavio puteolano, in Memorie dell’Accademia di Lettere, Archeologia e Belle Arti di Napoli, Naples : G. Macchiaroli, 1955. (OCLC 79380459)
- Sirpettino, Mario. I campi flegrei. Guida storica, Naples : Edizioni scientifiche italiane, 1999. (OCLC 42942285)
- Puteoli. Studi di storia antica, vols.I-II, Pozzuoli : Azienda autonoma di soggiorno, cura e turismo di Pozzuoli, 1977–1978. (OCLC 5699428)
- I Campi Flegrei. Un itinerario archeologico. Venice : Marsilio, 1990. (OCLC 24577091)
