= Januarius =

Bishop of Benevento and saint

Saint Januarius
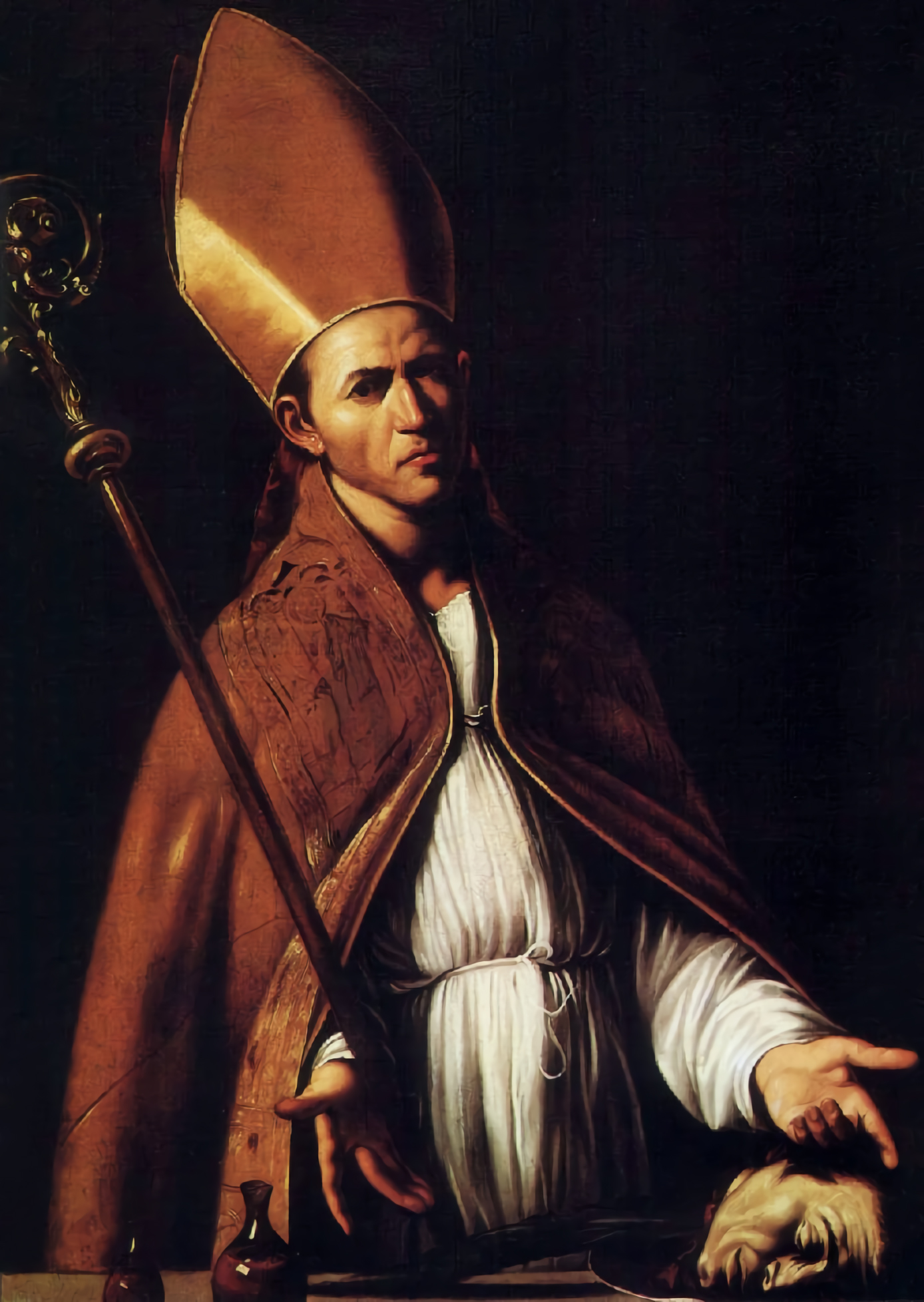
- Copy taken from a portrait of Saint Januarius by Caravaggio

Bishop and Martyr
- Born: 3rd century (c. 21 April 232); Benevento or Naples, Campania, Roman Empire
- Died: c. 19 September 305; Pozzuoli, Campania
- Venerated in: Catholic Church, Eastern Orthodox Church, and Armenian Apostolic Church
- Major shrine: Naples Cathedral, Italy and the Church of the Most Precious Blood, Little Italy, Manhattan, New York City.
- Feast: 19 September, Feast of San Gennaro (Catholic Church); 21 April (Eastern Christianity); Monday after second Sunday of Advent (Armenian Apostolic Church)
- Attributes: vials of blood, palms, Mount Vesuvius
- Patronage: blood banks; Naples; volcanic eruptions

Januarius (/ˌdʒæn.juˈɛəriəs/ JAN-yoo-AIR-ee-əs; Latin: Ianuarius; Neapolitan and Italian: Gennaro), also known as Januarius I of Benevento, was Bishop of Benevento and is a martyr and saint of the Catholic Church. While no contemporary sources on his life are preserved, later sources and legends say he died during the Great Persecution, which ended with Diocletian's retirement in 305.

Januarius is the patron saint of Naples, where the faithful gather three times a year in Naples Cathedral to witness the liquefaction of what is claimed to be a sample of his blood kept in a sealed ampoule.

== Life ==
Little is known of Januarius' life. What follows mostly derives from later Christian sources, such as the Acta Bononensia (BHL 4132, not earlier than 6th century) and the Acta Vaticana (BHL 4115, 9th century), and later folk traditions.

=== Legend ===
According to various hagiographies, Januarius was born in Benevento to a rich patrician family that traced its descent to the Caudini tribe of the Samnites. At age 15, he became local priest of his parish in Benevento, which at the time had only a small Christian community. When Januarius was 20, he became Bishop of Naples and befriended Juliana of Nicomedia and Sossius, whom he met during his studies for the priesthood. During Emperor Diocletian's 1 1/2-year-long persecution of Christians, Januarius hid some of his fellow Christians and prevented them from being caught. But while visiting Sossius in jail, he too was arrested. He and his colleagues were condemned to be thrown to wild bears in the Flavian Amphitheater at Pozzuoli, but the sentence was changed due to fear of public disturbance, and they were instead beheaded at the Solfatara crater near Pozzuoli. (Note: For further details on these locations, see the Catholic Encyclopedia's article on "Saint Januarius".) Other legends say either that the wild beasts refused to eat him or that he was thrown into a furnace but came out unscathed.

=== History ===
The earliest historical reference to Januarius is in a letter by Uranius, bishop of Nola, dated 432, on the death of his mentor Paulinus of Nola. The letter says the ghosts of Januarius and Martin of Tours appeared to Paulinus three days before his death in 431. Of Januarius, the letter says only that he was "bishop as well as martyr, an illustrious member of the Neapolitan church". (Note: Latin: Ianuarius, episcopus simul et martyr, Neapolitanae urbis illustrat ecclesiam.) The Acta Bononensia says, "At Pozzuoli in Campania [is honored the memory] of the holy martyrs Januarius, Bishop of Beneventum, Festus his deacon, and Desiderius lector, together with Sossius deacon of the church of Misenum, Proculus, deacon of Pozzuoli, Eutyches, and Acutius, who after chains and imprisonment were beheaded under the emperor Diocletian".

Paintings depicting Saint Januarius

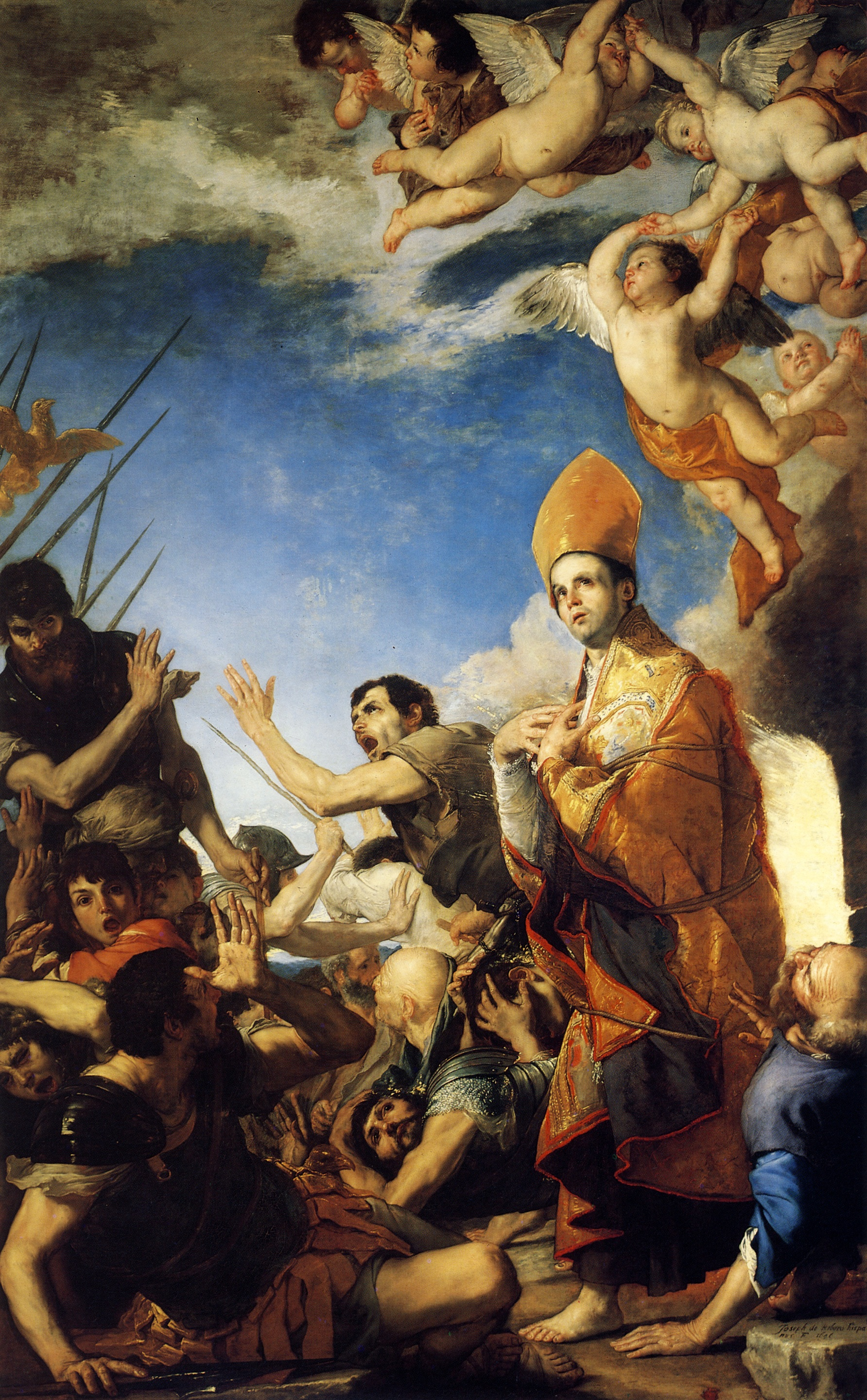
Ribera, Saint Januarius Emerges Unscathed from the Furnace, Naples Cathedral

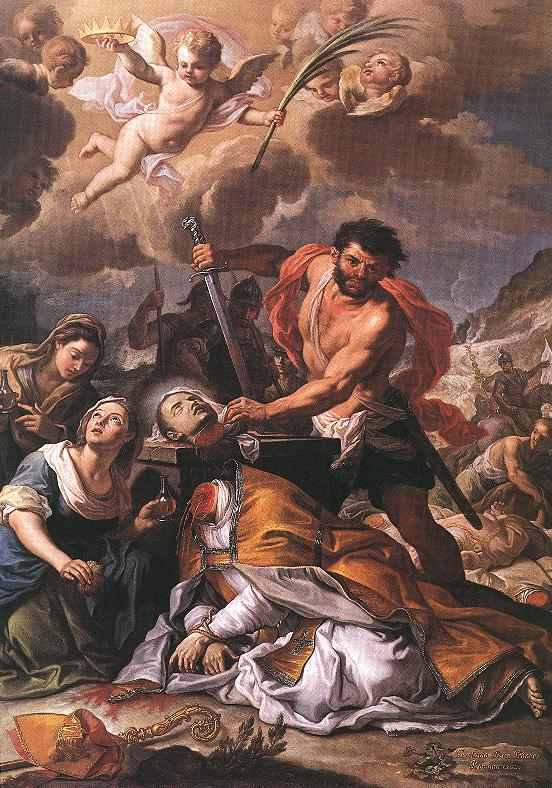
Martyrdom of Saint Januarius by Girolamo Pesce

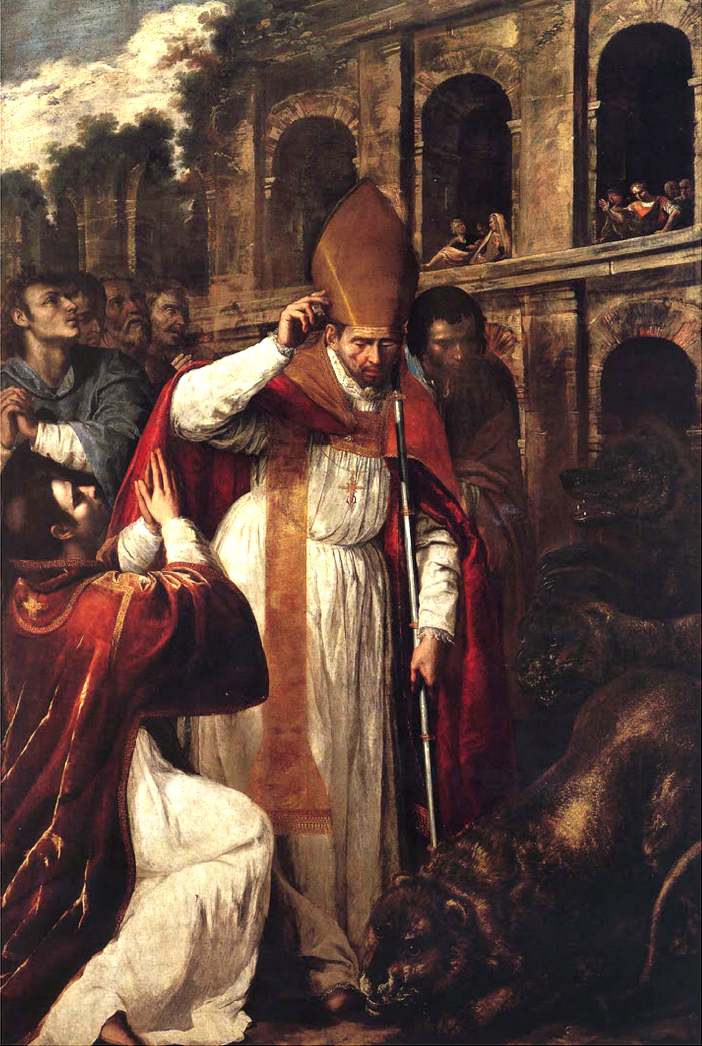
The Martyrdom of St Januarius, by Artemisia Gentileschi (1636)

== Legacy ==
=== Celebrations ===
The Feast of San Gennaro is celebrated on 19 September in the General Roman Calendar of the Catholic Church. (Note: In the 1498 Roman martyrology, his martyrdom took place on the thirteenth day before the kalends of October or 19 September.) In the Eastern Church, it is celebrated on 21 April. The city of Naples has more than 50 official patron saints, but its principal patron is Saint Januarius. Januarius has been traditionally invoked by the people of Naples on several occasions, e.g. to ask for help, healing and special favors; memorably, he was called on to stop the 1631 eruption of Mount Vesuvius, and the lava – that was about to destroy the towns around it – slowed down.

In the United States, the Feast of San Gennaro is also a highlight of the year for New York's Little Italy, with the saint's polychrome statue carried through the middle of a street fair. A fictionalized version of the event is depicted in The Godfather Part II.

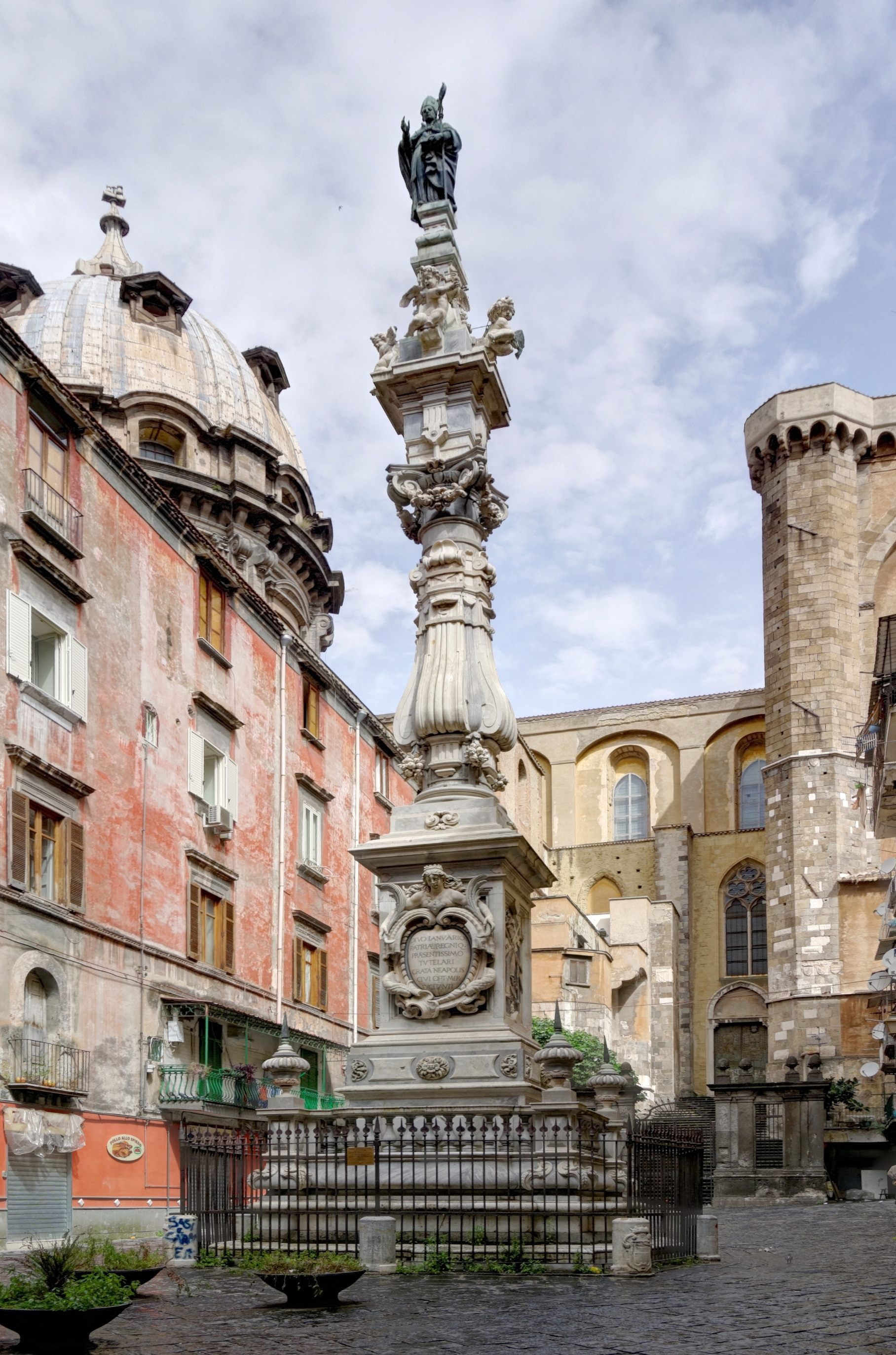
The spire of the Cattedrale di San Gennaro (Naples Cathedral), erected in Janurius after the 1631 eruption of Mount Vesuvius

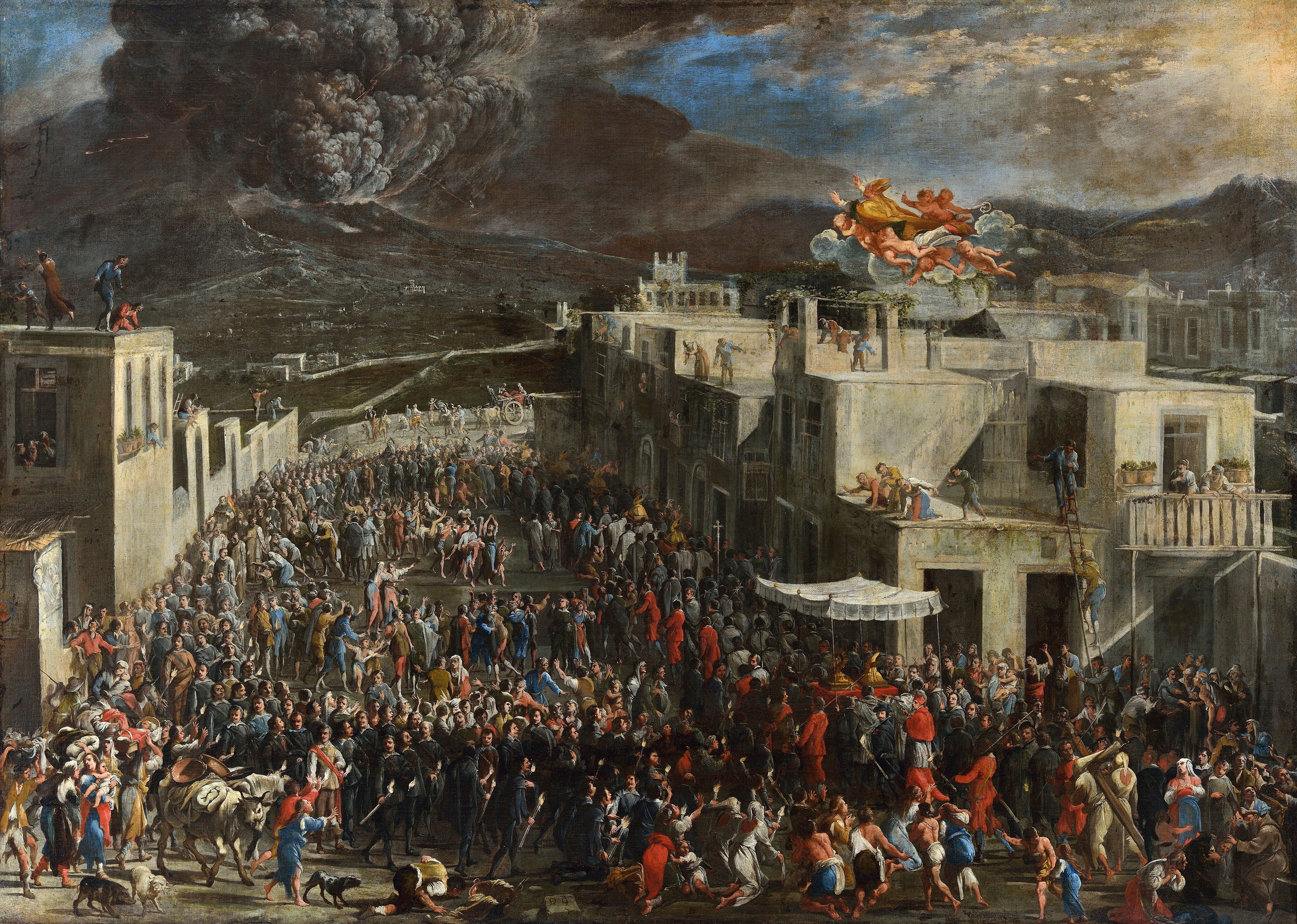
Procession to Invoke Saint Januarius during the Eruption of Vesuvius in 1631 (c. 1656 – c. 1660) by Domenico Gargiulo

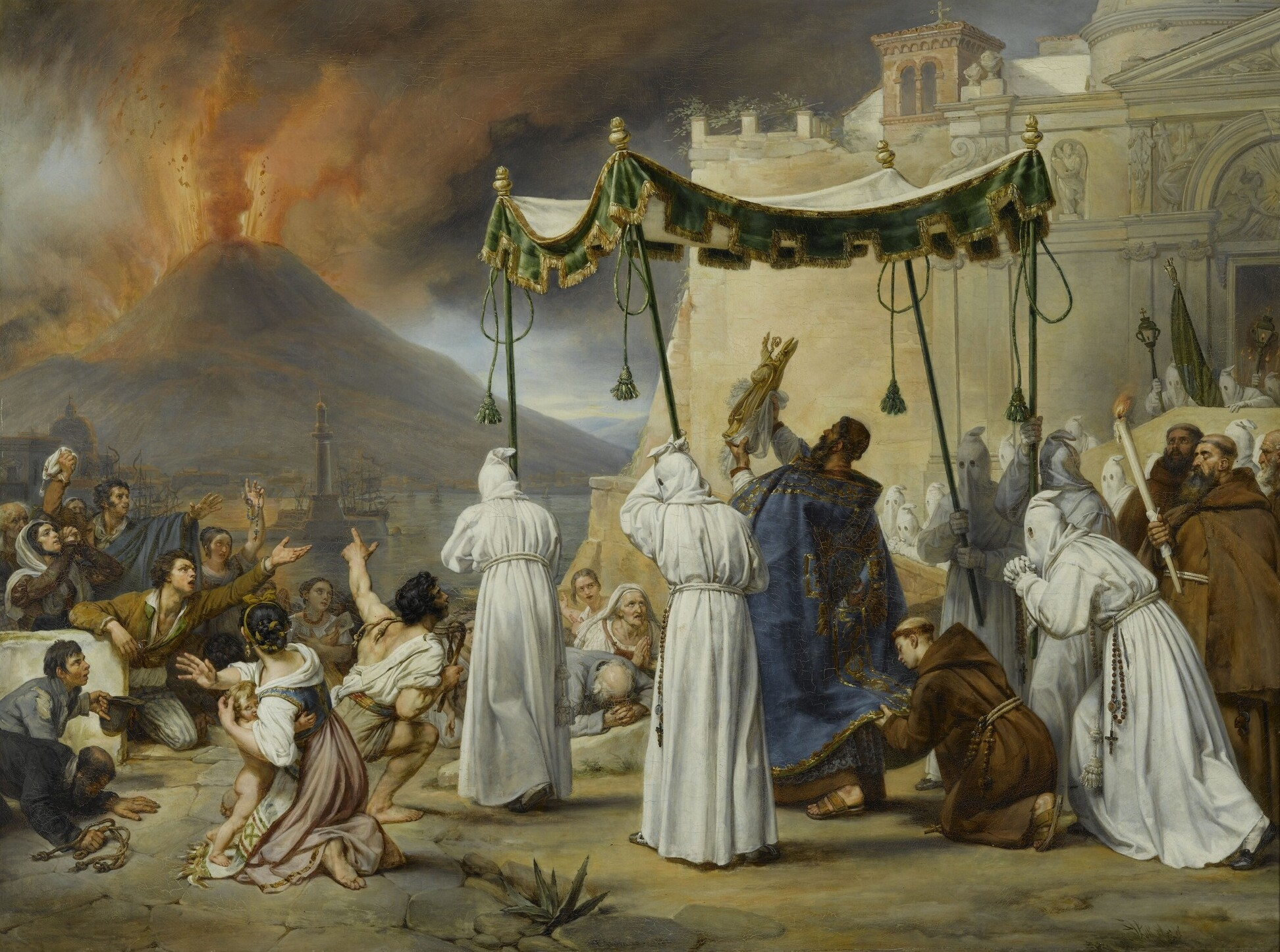
Procession of Saint Januarius During an Eruption of Vesuvius by Antoine Jean-Baptiste Thomas, 1822

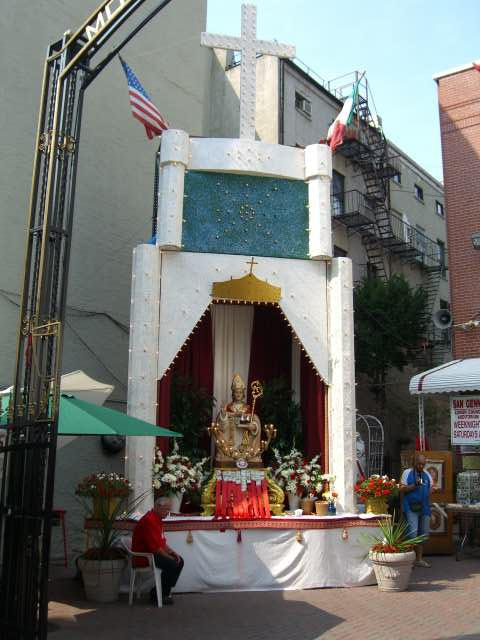
A shrine to San Gennaro at the Church of the Most Precious Blood in Little Italy, Manhattan.

=== Relics ===
According to an early hagiography, (Note: Hagiographies of St Januarius are compiled in the 6th volume of the Acta Sanctorum Septembris.) Januarius' relics were transferred by order of Severus, Bishop of Naples, to the Neapolitan catacombs "outside the walls" (extra moenia). (Note: A condensed account of the removals of the relics is given by Norman.) In the early ninth century the body was moved to Beneventum by Sico, prince of Benevento, with the head remaining in Naples. Subsequently, during the turmoil at the time of Frederick Barbarossa, his body was moved again, to the Territorial Abbey of Montevergine, where it was rediscovered in 1480.

In 1497, at the instigation of Cardinal Oliviero Carafa, the body was transferred to Naples, where he is the city's patron saint. Carafa commissioned a richly decorated crypt, the Succorpo, beneath the cathedral to house the reunited body and head. The Succorpo was finished in 1506 and is considered one of the city's prominent monuments of the High Renaissance.

==== Blood ====
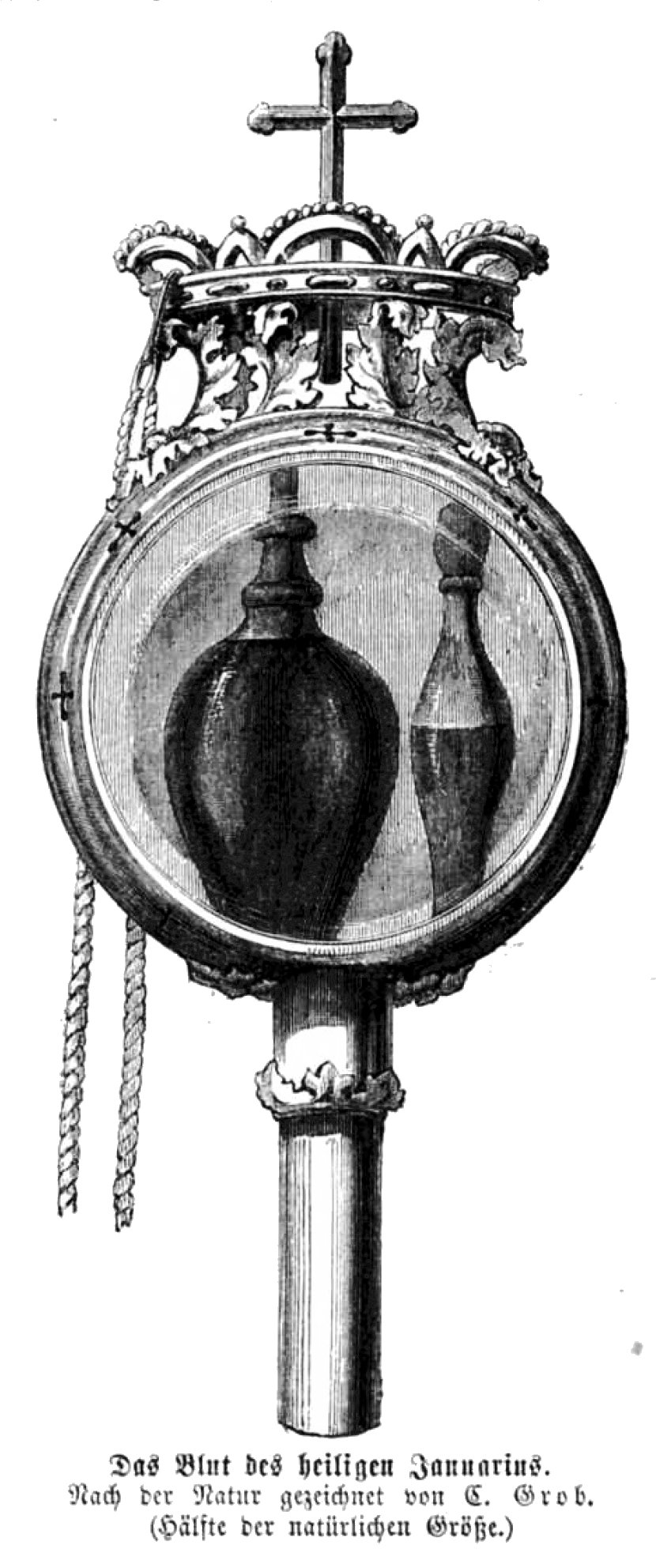
Drawing of the reliquary containing the two ampoules said to hold Januarius' blood, c. 1860

Januarius is famous for the annual liquefaction of his blood, which, according to legend, was saved by a woman named Eusebia just after his death. A chronicle of Naples written in 1382 describes the cult of Saint Januarius in detail, but mentions neither the relic nor the miracle. The first certain date is 1389, when it was found to have melted. Over the next two and a half centuries official reports began to appear declaring that the blood spontaneously melted, at first once a year, then twice, and finally three times a year. While the report of the first incidence of liquefaction made no explicit reference to the saint's skull, soon afterward assertions began to appear that this relic was activating the melting process, as if the blood, recognizing a part of the body to which it belonged, "were impatient while waiting for its resurrection". This explanation was definitively abandoned only in the 18th century.

Thousands of people assemble to witness this event in Naples Cathedral three times a year: on 19 September (Saint Januarius' Day, commemorating his martyrdom), 16 December (celebrating his patronage of Naples and its archdiocese), and the Saturday before the first Sunday of May (commemorating the reunification of his relics).

The blood is also said to spontaneously liquefy at certain other times, such as papal visits. It supposedly liquefied in the presence of Pope Pius IX in 1848, but not that of John Paul II in 1979 or Benedict XVI in 2007. On March 21, 2015, Pope Francis venerated the dried blood during a visit to Naples Cathedral, saying the Lord's Prayer over it and kissing it. Archbishop Sepe then said, "The blood has half liquefied, which shows that Saint Januarius loves our pope and Naples."

When the blood fails to liquefy it is said to be a bad omen, some people even correlate some of the years when the miracle did not happen with wars or pandemics. Times where the blood did not liquefy include: September 1939, September 1940, September 1943, September 1973, September 1980, December 2016 and December 2020. The blood usually takes anywhere from 2 minutes to one hour to fully liquify but it can take days.

==== Ritual liquefaction ====
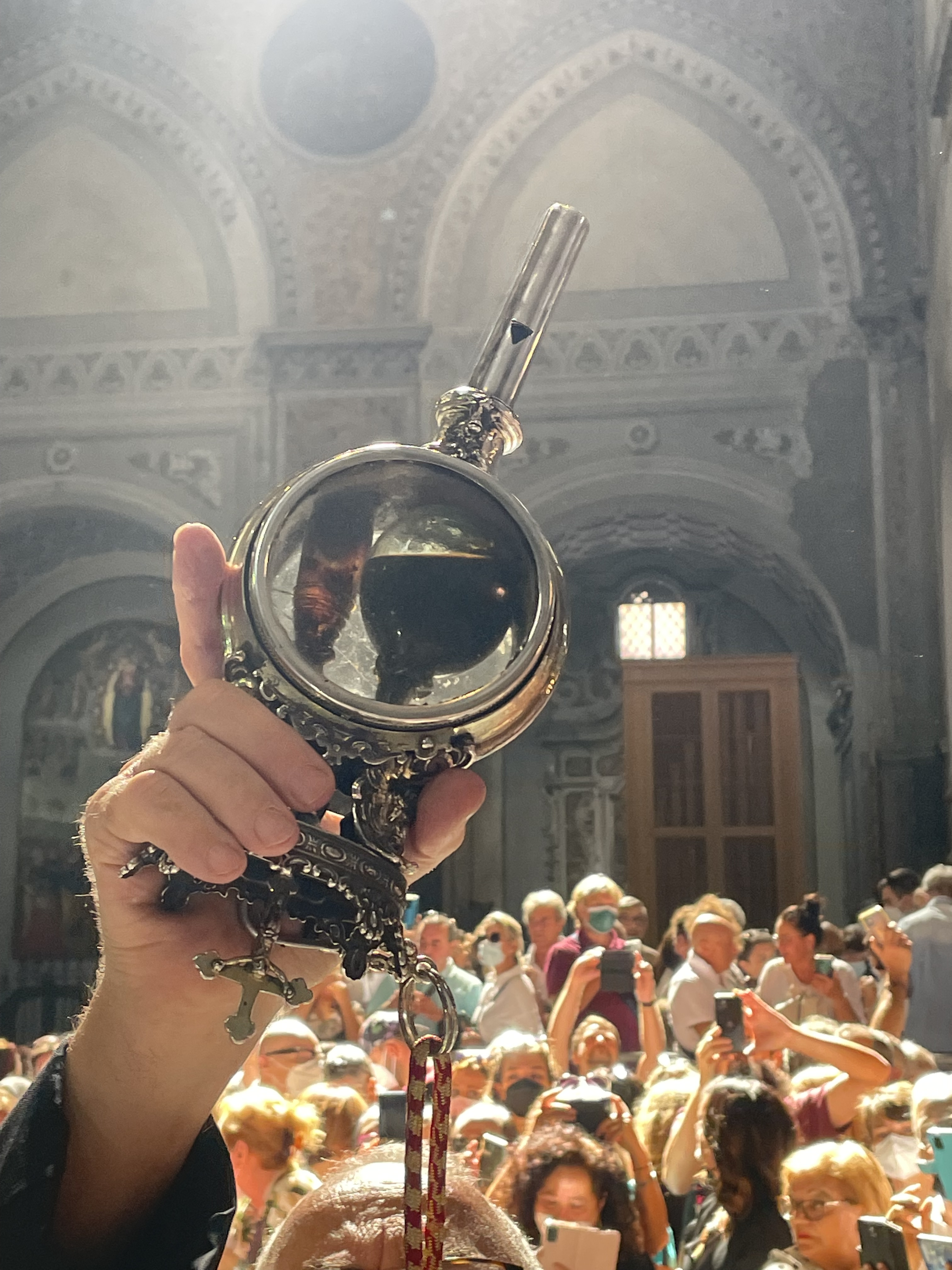
The reliquary being held upside-down during 2022 Saint Januarius' Day celebrations, revealing the liquid inside the ampoules

The blood is stored in two hermetically sealed small ampoules, held since the 17th century in a silver reliquary between two round glass plates about 12 cm wide. The smaller, cylindrical ampoule contains only a few reddish spots on its walls, the bulk having allegedly been removed and taken to Spain by Charles III. The larger, almond-shaped ampoule, with a capacity of about 60 ml, is about 60% filled with a dark reddish substance. Separate reliquaries hold bone fragments believed to belong to Januarius.

The ampoules are kept in a bank vault whose keys are held by a commission of local notables, including the mayor of Naples; the bones are kept in a crypt under Naples Cathedral's main altar. On feast days, these relics are taken in procession from the cathedral to the Monastery of Santa Chiara, where the archbishop holds up the reliquary and tilts it to show that the contents are solid, then places it on the high altar next to the saint's other relics. After intense prayers by the faithful, including the so-called "relatives of Saint Januarius" (parenti di San Gennaro), the content of the larger vial typically appears to liquify. The archbishop then holds up the vial and tilts it again to demonstrate that liquefaction has taken place. The ampoules remain exposed on the altar for eight days, while the priests move or turn them periodically to show that the contents remain liquid. Sir Francis Ronalds gives a detailed description of the May 1819 ritual in his travel journal.

The liquefaction sometimes takes place almost immediately and sometimes takes hours or even days. According to records kept at the Duomo, on rare occasions the contents fail to liquify, are found already liquified when the ampoules are taken from the safe, or liquify outside the usual dates.

==== Scientific studies ====
While the Catholic Church has always supported the celebrations, it has never formulated an official statement on the phenomenon and maintains a neutral stance about scientific investigations. It does not permit the vials to be opened nor examinations of the substances contents, for fear that doing so may cause irreparable damage. This makes close analysis impossible. Nevertheless, a spectroscopic analysis performed in 1902 by Gennaro Sperindeo claimed that the spectrum was consistent with hemoglobin. A later analysis, with similar conclusions, was carried out by a team in 1989, but the reliability of these observations has been questioned. While clotted blood can be liquefied by mechanical stirring, the resulting suspension cannot solidify again.

Measurements made in 1900 and 1904 claimed that the ampoules' weight increased by up to 28 grams during liquefaction. Later measurements with a precision balance, performed over five years, failed to detect any variation.

Various suggestions for the contents' composition have been advanced, such as a material that is photosensitive, hygroscopic, or has a low melting point. These explanations face technical difficulties, such as the variability of the phenomenon and its lack of correlation to ambient temperature.

A recent hypothesis by Garlaschelli & al. is that the vial contains a thixotropic gel. In such a substance viscosity increases if left unstirred and decreases if stirred or moved. Researchers have proposed specifically a suspension of hydrated iron oxide, FeO(OH), which reproduces the color and behavior of the "blood" in the ampoule. The suspension can be prepared from simple chemicals that were easily available locally since antiquity.

In 2010, Giuseppe Geraci, a professor in the Department of Molecular Biology at Naples' Frederick II University, conducted an experiment on a vial containing old blood—a relic dating to the 18th century from the Eremo di Camaldoli near Arezzo in Tuscany—having the same characteristics of the blood of Januarius. Geraci showed that the Camaldoli relic also contains blood that can change its solid-liquid phase by shaking. He further reproduced the phenomenon with his own blood stored in the same conditions as the Camaldoli relic. He wrote, "There is no univocal scientific fact that explains why these changes take place. It is not enough to attribute to the movement the ability to dissolve the blood, the liquid contained in the Treasure case changes state for reasons still to be identified." He concluded, "there's blood, no miracle".

A book by the historian of science Francesco Paolo de Ceglia traces the research of various scientists over the centuries to explain the phenomenon, which, according to him, has a thermal origin, since the (alleged) blood, in September, when the temperature is highest, is already extracted in liquid form from the tabernacle that stores it. In May it takes longer, and in December it takes much longer. This last annual "miracle" did not take place for many years, but lately, with climate change and the rising temperature in Naples, it has happened more often.

In 2025, the main competing hypothesis were reviewed to explain the liquification phenomenon. Thixotropy has been proposed by Luigi Garlaschelli to support that the relic is a medieval forgery, while the spectroscopy analysis showed blood is present in the ampoules. The authors highlighted Geraci's previous 2010 observations on the 300 year old Camaldolese relic, which indicated that the changes are by a natural chemical reaction rather than thixotropy or supernatural intervention. Luigi Garlaschelli in 2026 would release another study on the phenomenon of liquifying blood relics across Italy, and reiterated that they can be replicated using only 14th century materials. The investigation included those of St. Lawrence, St. Pantaleone and that of St. Januarius.

==== Similar rites ====
Although Naples became known as "City of Blood" (urbs sanguinum), legends of blood liquefaction are not a unique phenomenon. Other examples include vials of the blood of Saint Patricia and Saint John the Baptist in the monastery of San Gregorio Armeno, and of Saint Pantaleon in Ravello. In all, the church has recognized claims of miraculous liquefying blood for seven or about twenty saints from Campania and virtually nowhere else. The other saints' blood cults have been discontinued since the 16th century, which noted skeptic James Randi takes as evidence that local artisans or alchemists had a secret recipe for manufacturing this type of relic. A team of three Italian chemists created a liquid that reproduces all the characteristics and behavior of the liquid in the vial, using only local materials and techniques known to medieval workers. Jordan Lancaster leaves open the possibility that the practice was a Christian version of a pagan ritual intended to protect the locals from unexpected eruptions from Mount Vesuvius.

=== Museum of the Treasure of St. Januarius ===
The Treasure of St. Januarius is a collection of works and donations collected over seven centuries from popes, kings, emperors, and other famous and ordinary people. According to studies by a pool of experts who analyzed all the pieces in the collection, the Treasure of St. Januarius is of higher value than the crown of Queen Elizabeth II of the United Kingdom and the Tsar of Russia. The Treasure is a unique collection of art masterpieces, kept untouched thanks to the Deputation of the Chapel of St Januarius, a secular institution founded in 1527 by a vote of the city of Naples.

The Treasure is exhibited in the Museum of the Treasure of St. Januarius, whose entrance is on the right side of the Dome of Naples, under the arcades. By visiting the museum, the Chapel of San Gennaro is accessible even when the cathedral is closed.

== See also ==
- Feast of San Gennaro, as held annually in New York, Los Angeles, and Las Vegas
- Museum of the Treasure of St Januarius
- Order of St. Januarius
- Saint Januarius, patron saint archive
