= Genaro =

Genaro (from the Latin Januarius, meaning "devoted to Janus") may refer to

- Genaro (given name)
- Genaro (surname)
- Genaro P. and Carolina Briones House in Austin, Texas, United States

== See also ==
- Gennaro (disambiguation)
