= San Gennaro (disambiguation) =

San Gennaro usually refers to St Januarius, bishop of Naples.

San Gennaro may also refer to:

- Festival, Fair, or Feast of San Gennaro: September 19
- San Gennaro, a grape
- Cathedral of San Gennaro in Naples
- San Gennaro extra Moenia ("San Gennaro-beyond-the-Walls"), a church in Naples
- Royal Chapel of the Treasure of San Gennaro in Naples
- Museum of the Treasure of San Gennaro in Naples
- San Gennaro al Vomero, a church in Naples
- San Gennaro all’Olmo, a former church in Naples
- Catacombs of San Gennaro in Naples
- Abbey of San Gennaro:
  - Abbey of San Gennaro in Cervinara (est. c. 1100), now dedicated to Our Lady of Sorrows
  - Abbey of San Gennaro in Capolona (est. 972)
- San Gennaro dei Poveri ("San Gennaro of the Poor"), a hospital in Naples
- Porta San Gennaro ("San Gennaro Gate") in Naples
- San Gennaro Vesuviano, a village near Naples
- Order of San Gennaro, a knightly order headed by the titular King of Naples, a member of the Spanish royal family
- Spanish ship San Gennaro (1765), a Spanish 86-gun ship of the line ceded to France, where it served as the Tourville

== See also ==
- Januarius, the latinate form of the name
- January, the anglicized form of the name
- Gennaro, the italicized form of the name
- Treasure of San Gennaro, an Italian comedy
- San Gennaro's Blood (San Gennaro Vére), a novel set in Naples
- "gennaro" also refers to the month January in italian
