= Genaro (given name) =

Genaro (from the Latin Januarius, meaning "devoted to Janus") is a Hispanic masculine given name that may refer to the following notable people:

- Genaro Borrego Estrada (born 1949), Mexican politician
- Genaro Carrió (1922–1997), Argentinian jurist and translator
- Genaro Castillo (born 1993), Mexican football player
- Genaro Carreño Muro (born 1958), Mexican politician
- Genaro David Góngora (born 1937), Mexican jurist
- Genaro Díaz (1904–1963), Mexican bobsledder
- Genaro Estrada (1887–1937), Mexican statesman, academic, and writer
- Genaro Fessia (born 1981), Argentine rugby union footballer
- Genaro García (boxer) (1977–2013), Mexican boxer
- Genaro García Luna (born 1968), Mexican government official, engineer and later drug lord
- Genaro Gatusso, former AC Milan midfielder
- Genaro Hernández (1966–2011), American boxer
- Genaro Léon (born 1960), Mexican boxer
- Genaro Lezcano, Argentine basketball player
- Genaro López (born 1954), Panamanian union leader and politician
- Genaro Magsaysay (1924–1978), Filipino politician and lawyer
- Genaro Mejía de la Merced (born 1968), Mexican politician
- Genaro Prono (born 1989), Paraguayan swimmer
- Genaro Rodríguez (born 1998), Spanish football player
- Genaro Rojas (born 1970), Mexican sprinter
- Genaro Saavedra (born 1895), Filipino track and field athlete
- Genaro Sermeño (1948–2022), Salvadorian football player
- Genaro Snijders (born 1989), Dutch football winger
- Genaro Ruiz Arriaga (born 1955), Mexican politician
- Genaro Ruiz Camacho (1954–1998), American organized crime leader
- Genaro V. Vásquez (1892–1967), Mexican lawyer
- Genaro Vázquez Rojas (1930–1972), Mexican school teacher and guerrilla fighter

== See also ==
- Gennaro (disambiguation)
