= Gennaro (given name) =

Gennaro (from the Latin Januarius, meaning "devoted to Janus") is an Italian masculine given name that may refer to the following notable people:

- Gennaro Acampora (born 1994), Italian football midfielder
- Gennaro Amatore (born 1998), know professionally as Samurai Jay, Italian rapper and singer-songwriter
- Gennaro D'Alessandro (c.1717–1778), Italian Baroque composer and harpsichordist
- Gennaro Angiulo (1919–2009), American mafia underboss
- Gennaro Annese (1604–1648), Italian revolutionary
- Gennaro Arcucci (died 1800), Italian physician
- Gennaro Armeno (born 1994), Italian football midfielder
- Gennaro Astarita (c.1745–1805), Italian composer
- Gennaro Auletta (born 1957), Italian philosopher
- Gennaro Basile, 18th century Italian painter
- Gennaro Bizzarro (born 1976), American attorney and Republican politician
- Gennaro Bonafede (born 1990), South African racing driver
- Gennaro Bracigliano (born 1980), French football goalkeeper
- Gennaro Calì (c.1799–1877), Italian sculptor
- Gennaro "Jerry" Casale (1933–2019), starting pitcher in Major League Baseball
- Gennaro Chierchia (born 1953), Italian linguist
- Gennaro Cirillo (born 1961), Italian sprint canoer
- Gennaro di Cola (c.1320–1370), Italian painter
- Gennaro Delvecchio (born 1978) is an Italian football official and a former player
- Gennaro Favai (1879–1958), Italian artist
- Gennaro Federico (died 1744), Neapolitan poet and opera librettist
- Gennaro Filomarino (1591–1650), Catholic prelate
- Gennaro Fragiello (born 1984), Italian football player
- Gennaro Gallo (born 1984), Italian lightweight rower
- Gennaro Gattuso (born 1978), Italian football player
- Gennaro of Naples and Sicily, prince
- Gennaro Giametta (1867–1938), Italian painter
- Gennaro Granito Pignatelli di Belmonte (1851–1948), Italian Cardinal of the Catholic Church
- Gennaro Greco (1663–1714), Italian architectural painter
- Gennaro Iezzo (born 1973), Italian football goalkeeper
- Gennaro Langella (1938–2013), American mafia boss
- Gennaro Licciardi (1956–1994), Italian Camorrista
- Gennaro Lombardi, Italian immigrant to the United States
- Gennaro Magri, Italian dancer, choreographer, pedagogue, and writer
- Gennaro Maldarelli (c.1796–1858), Italian painter
- Gennaro Manna (1715–1779), Italian composer
- Gennaro Migliore (born 1968), Italian politician
- Gennaro Monaco (born 1968), Italian association football player
- Gennaro DiNapoli (born 1975), American football center and guard
- Gennaro Di Napoli (born 1968), Italian middle-distance runner
- Gennaro Negri, 19th-century Italian song composer
- Gennaro Nunziante, Italian film director
- Gennaro Olivieri (footballer) (1942–2020), Italian professional football player and coach
- Gennaro Olivieri (television personality) (1922–2009), Swiss ice hockey referee and television personality
- Gennaro Pantalena (1848–1915), Italian actor-manager and playwright
- Gennaro Papa (1925–2018), Italian politician
- Gennaro Papi (1886–1941), Italian operatic conductor
- Gennaro Pirelli (born 2000), Italian judoka
- Gennaro Portanova (1845–1908), Italian cardinal of the Catholic Church
- Gennaro Righelli (1886–1949), Italian film director, screenwriter and actor
- Gennaro Rubino (1859–1918), Italian anarchist
- Gennaro Ruggiero (born 2000), Italian football midfielder
- Gennaro Ruo (1812–1884), Italian painter
- Gennaro Ruotolo (born 1967), Italian football midfielder and manager
- Gennaro Sabatino (born 1993), Italian motorcycle racer
- Gennaro Sanfelice (1622–1694), Catholic prelate
- Gennaro Santillo (1908–1943), Italian football player
- Gennaro Sardo (born 1979), Italian football right back
- Gennaro Maria Sarnelli (1702–1744), Italian Catholic priest
- Gennaro Scarlato (born 1977), Italian association football defender and manager
- Gennaro Scognamiglio (born 1987), Italian football player
- Gennaro Serra, Duke of Cassano (1772–1799), Italian revolutionary and soldier
- Gennaro Spinelli, Prince of Cariati (1780–1851), Italian politician and diplomat
- Gennaro Troianiello (born 1983), Italian football midfielder
- Gennaro Tutino (born 1996), Italian football forward
- Gennaro Ursino (1650–1715), Italian composer and teacher
- Gennaro Verolino (1906–2005), Catholic bishop and a diplomat for the Holy See
- Gennaro Vitiello (1929–1985), Italian stage actor and director
- Gennaro Volpe (born 1981), Italian football player and coach

== See also ==
- Genaro (surname)
