= January 7 =

January 7 this year in various calendars
- Wednesday, 7 January 2026
Akan	Nkyiwukuo
Armenian	21 Arach 1475
Aztec	Huei Tozoztli 17, 11 Cōātl
Babylonian	17 Kislimu, 2336 SE
Balinese pawukon	Luang, Pepet, Kajeng, Sri, Wage, Urukung, Buda of Merakih, Sri, Gigis, Pati
Bengali	23 Poush, BS 1432
Chinese	Yin Metal Snake・Chariot Mansion; Wood Snake Year, Month 11, Day 19 (Xiaohan, 13 days until Dahan)
Common Era	7 January 2026 CE
Coptic	29 Koiak, AM 1742
Egyptian	26 Pachon, 2774 NE
Ethiopian	29 Tākḫśāś, 2018 Amätä Məhrät
French Republican	Décade II, Octidi de Nivôse de l'Année 234 de la République
Gregorian	7 January, AD 2026
Hebrew	18 Tevet, AM 5786
Hindu	Maghā・Ayuṣmān; Solar: 23 Pauṣa, 1947 SE; Lunisolar: Caturthī, Kṛishna pakṣa of Pauṣa, 2082 VE; Siddhārthin・5126 KY・1,872,582
Icelandic	Miðvikudagur, 15 Mörsugur 2025
Islamic	18 Rajab, AH 1447 (using tabular method)
ISO week date	2026-W02-3
Japanese	19 Shimotsuki, Reiwa 8 (Shōkan, 13 days until Daikan)
Julian	25 December, AD 2025 (AM 7535)
Julian day	2461048
Korean	19 Jwidal, 4358 DE
Maya	13.0.13.4.5; 3 Muan, 11 Chicchan
Roman	ante diem VIII Kalendas Ianuarias, MMDCCLXXIX AUC
Solar Hijri	17 Dey, SH 1404
Tibetan	19 mgo, shing mo sbrul 2152 or 1771 or 999

<<	January					>>
Su	Mo	Tu	We	Th	Fr	Sa
				1	2	3
4	5	6	7	8	9	10
11	12	13	14	15	16	17
18	19	20	21	22	23	24
25	26	27	28	29	30	31
2026

January 7 in recent years
2026 (Wednesday)
2025 (Tuesday)
2024 (Sunday)
2023 (Saturday)
2022 (Friday)
2021 (Thursday)
2020 (Tuesday)
2019 (Monday)
2018 (Sunday)
2017 (Saturday)

January 7 is the seventh day of the year in the Gregorian calendar; 358 days remain until the end of the year (359 in leap years).

== Events ==
=== Pre-1600 ===
- 49 BC – The Senate of Rome says that Caesar will be declared a public enemy unless he disbands his army, prompting the tribunes who support him to flee to where Caesar is waiting in Ravenna.
- 1078 – The people of Constantinople revolt, lynch the unpopular official Nikephoritzes and proclaim Nikephoros Botaneiates as emperor.
- 1325 – Afonso IV becomes King of Portugal.
- 1558 – French troops, led by Francis, Duke of Guise, take Calais, the last continental possession of England.

=== 1601–1900 ===
- 1608 – Fire destroys Jamestown, Virginia.
- 1610 – Galileo Galilei makes his first observation of the four Galilean moons: Ganymede, Callisto, Io and Europa, although he is not able to distinguish the last two until the following night.
- 1708 – Battle of Zlatoust: Battle between Bashkir and Tatar rebels and the government troops of the Tsardom of Russia. It is one of the events of the Bashkir rebellion of 1704–1711.
- 1708 – Bashkir rebels besiege Yelabuga.
- 1738 – A peace treaty is signed between Peshwa Bajirao and Jai Singh II following Maratha victory in the Battle of Bhopal.
- 1782 – The first American commercial bank, the Bank of North America, opens.
- 1785 – Frenchman Jean-Pierre Blanchard and American John Jeffries travel from Dover, England, to Calais, France, in a gas balloon.
- 1835 – HMS Beagle, with Charles Darwin on board, drops anchor off the Chonos Archipelago.
- 1867 – The Kingstree jail fire kills 22 freedmen in Reconstruction-era South Carolina.
- 1894 – Thomas Edison makes a kinetoscopic film of someone sneezing. On the same day, his employee, William Kennedy Dickson, receives a patent for motion picture film.

=== 1901–present ===
- 1904 – The distress signal "CQD" is established only to be replaced two years later by "SOS".
- 1919 – Montenegrin guerrilla fighters rebel against the planned annexation of Montenegro by Serbia, but fail.
- 1920 – The New York State Assembly refuses to seat five duly elected Socialist assemblymen.
- 1922 – Dáil Éireann ratifies the Anglo-Irish Treaty by a 64–57 vote.
- 1927 – The first transatlantic commercial telephone service is established from New York City to London.
- 1928 – A disastrous flood of the River Thames kills 14 people and causes extensive damage to much of riverside London.
- 1931 – Guy Menzies flies the first solo non-stop trans-Tasman flight (from Australia to New Zealand) in 11 hours and 45 minutes, crash-landing on New Zealand's west coast.
- 1935 – Benito Mussolini and French Foreign Minister Pierre Laval sign the Franco-Italian Agreement.
- 1940 – Winter War: Battle of Raate Road: The Finnish 9th Division finally defeat the numerically superior Soviet forces on the Raate-Suomussalmi road.
- 1948 – Kentucky Air National Guard pilot Thomas Mantell crashes while in pursuit of a supposed UFO.
- 1950 – In the Sverdlovsk air disaster, all 19 of those on board are killed, including almost the entire national ice hockey team (VVS Moscow) of the Soviet Air Force – 11 players, as well as a team doctor and a masseur.
- 1954 – Georgetown–IBM experiment: The first public demonstration of a machine translation system is held in New York at the head office of IBM.
- 1955 – Contralto Marian Anderson becomes the first person of color to perform at the Metropolitan Opera in Giuseppe Verdi's Un ballo in maschera.
- 1959 – The United States recognizes the new Cuban government of Fidel Castro.
- 1968 – Surveyor program: Surveyor 7, the last spacecraft in the Surveyor series, lifts off from Cape Canaveral Launch Complex 36A.
- 1972 – Iberia Flight 602 crashes near Ibiza Airport, killing all 104 people on board.
- 1973 – In his second shooting spree of the week, Mark Essex fatally shoots seven people and wounds five others at Howard Johnson's Hotel in New Orleans, before being shot to death by police officers.
- 1979 – Third Indochina War: Cambodian–Vietnamese War: Phnom Penh falls to the advancing Vietnamese troops, driving out Pol Pot and the Khmer Rouge.
- 1980 – U.S. President Jimmy Carter authorizes legislation giving $1.5 billion in loans to bail out the Chrysler Corporation.
- 1984 – Brunei becomes the sixth member of the Association of Southeast Asian Nations (ASEAN).
- 1985 – Japan Aerospace Exploration Agency launches Sakigake, Japan's first interplanetary spacecraft and the first deep space probe to be launched by any country other than the United States or the Soviet Union.
- 1989 – Sutton United, a team in the fifth tier of English league football, defeated top-tier Coventry City in one of the biggest upsets in FA Cup history.
- 1991 – Roger Lafontant, former leader of the Tonton Macoute in Haiti under François Duvalier, attempts a coup d'état, which ends in his arrest.
- 1993 – The Fourth Republic of Ghana is inaugurated with Jerry Rawlings as president.
- 1993 – Bosnian War: The Bosnian Army executes a surprise attack at the village of Kravica in Srebrenica.
- 1994 – A British Aerospace Jetstream 41 operating as United Express Flight 6291 crashes in Gahanna, Ohio, killing five of the eight people on board.
- 1999 – The Senate trial in the impeachment of U.S. President Bill Clinton begins.
- 2012 – A hot air balloon crashes near Carterton, New Zealand, killing all 11 people on board.
- 2015 – Two gunmen commit mass murder at the offices of Charlie Hebdo in Paris, executing twelve people and wounding eleven others.
- 2015 – A car bomb explodes outside a police college in the Yemeni capital Sanaa with at least 38 people reported dead and more than 63 injured.
- 2020 – The 6.4M_{w} 2019–20 Puerto Rico earthquakes kill four and injure nine in southern Puerto Rico.
- 2023 – The longest U.S. House of Representatives speaker election since the December 1859 – February 1860 U.S. speaker election concludes and Kevin McCarthy is elected 55th Speaker of the United States House of Representatives.
- 2025 – A series of wildfires ravage the Greater Los Angeles area, resulting in at least 16 deaths and 13,401 structures destroyed.

== Births ==
=== Pre-1600 ===
- 889 – Li Bian, emperor of Southern Tang (died 943)
- 1355 – Thomas of Woodstock, Duke of Gloucester, English politician, Lord High Constable of England (died 1397)
- 1414 – Henry II, Count of Nassau-Siegen (died 1451)
- 1502 – Pope Gregory XIII (died 1585)

=== 1601–1900 ===
- 1634 – Adam Krieger, German organist and composer (died 1666)
- 1647 – William Louis, Duke of Württemberg (died 1677)
- 1685 – Jonas Alströmer, Swedish agronomist and businessman (died 1761)
- 1706 – Johann Heinrich Zedler, German publisher (died 1751)
- 1713 – Giovanni Battista Locatelli, Italian opera director and manager (died 1785)
- 1718 – Israel Putnam, American general (died 1790)
- 1746 – George Elphinstone, 1st Viscount Keith, Scottish admiral and politician (died 1823)
- 1768 – Joseph Bonaparte, Italian king (died 1844)
- 1797 – Mariano Paredes, Mexican general and 16th president (1845–1846) (died 1849)
- 1800 – Millard Fillmore, American politician, 13th President of the United States (died 1874)
- 1814 – Robert Nicoll, Scottish poet (died 1837)
- 1815 – Elizabeth Louisa Foster Mather, American writer (died 1882)
- 1827 – Sandford Fleming, Scottish-Canadian engineer, created Universal Standard Time (died 1915)
- 1830 – Albert Bierstadt, American painter (died 1902)
- 1831 – Heinrich von Stephan, German postman, founded the Universal Postal Union (died 1897)
- 1832 – James Munro, Scottish-Australian publisher and politician, 15th Premier of Victoria (died 1908)
- 1834 – Johann Philipp Reis, German physicist and academic, invented the Reis telephone (died 1874)
- 1837 – Thomas Henry Ismay, English businessman, founded the White Star Line Shipping Company (died 1899)
- 1844 – Bernadette Soubirous, French nun and saint (died 1879)
- 1856 – Evald Relander, Finnish teacher, agronomist and banker (died 1926)
- 1858 – Eliezer Ben-Yehuda, Belarusian lexicographer and journalist (died 1922)
- 1863 – Anna Murray Vail, American botanist and first librarian of the New York Botanical Garden (died 1955)
- 1871 – Émile Borel, French mathematician and politician (died 1956)
- 1873 – Charles Péguy, French poet and journalist (died 1914)
- 1873 – Adolph Zukor, Hungarian-American film producer, co-founded Paramount Pictures (died 1976)
- 1875 – Gustav Flatow, German gymnast (died 1945)
- 1876 – William Hurlstone, English pianist and composer (died 1906)
- 1877 – William Clarence Matthews, American baseball player, coach, and lawyer (died 1928)
- 1889 – Vera de Bosset, Russian-American ballerina (died 1982)
- 1890 – Malcolm Wheeler-Nicholson, American soldier, pulp magazine writer, and pioneer of the American comic book (died 1965)
- 1891 – Zora Neale Hurston, American novelist, short story writer, and folklorist (died 1960)
- 1895 – Hudson Fysh, Australian pilot and businessman, co-founded Qantas Airways Limited (died 1974)
- 1898 – Al Bowlly, Mozambican-English singer-songwriter (disputed; (died 1941)
- 1899 – Francis Poulenc, French pianist and composer (died 1963)
- 1899 – F. Orlin Tremaine, American magazine executive, writer, and magazine editor (Astounding Stories) (died 1956)
- 1900 – John Brownlee, Australian actor and singer (died 1969)

=== 1901–present ===
- 1903 – Alan Napier, English actor (died 1988)
- 1903 – Hooley Smith, Canadian ice hockey player (died 1963)
- 1904 – Joseph Whitty, Irish Republican died while on hunger strike at Curragh Internment camp (died 1923)
- 1908 – Red Allen, American trumpet player (died 1967)
- 1910 – Orval Faubus, American soldier and politician, 36th Governor of Arkansas (died 1994)
- 1912 – Charles Addams, American cartoonist, created The Addams Family (died 1988)
- 1913 – Francis de Wolff, English actor (died 1984)
- 1913 – Johnny Mize, American baseball player, coach, and sportscaster (died 1993)
- 1916 – W. L. Jeyasingham, Sri Lankan geographer and academic (died 1989)
- 1916 – Babe Pratt, Canadian ice hockey player (died 1988)
- 1920 – Vincent Gardenia, Italian-American actor (died 1992)
- 1921 – Esmeralda Arboleda Cadavid, Colombian politician (died 1997)
- 1921 – Chester Kallman, American poet and translator (died 1975)
- 1922 – Alvin Dark, American baseball player and manager (died 2014)
- 1922 – Jean-Pierre Rampal, French flute player (died 2000)
- 1923 – Hugh Kenner, Canadian scholar and critic (died 2003)
- 1923 – Vaklush Tolev, Bulgarian theologian, educator, public figure and lecturer (died 2013)
- 1924 – Geoffrey Bayldon, English actor (died 2017)
- 1925 – Gerald Durrell, Indian-English zookeeper, conservationist and author, founded Durrell Wildlife Park (died 1995)
- 1926 – Kim Jong-pil, South Korean lieutenant and politician, 11th Prime Minister of South Korea (died 2018)
- 1928 – William Peter Blatty, American author and screenwriter (died 2017)
- 1929 – Robert Juniper, Australian painter and sculptor (died 2012)
- 1929 – Terry Moore, American actress
- 1931 – Mirja Hietamies, Finnish skier (died 2013)
- 1933 – Elliott Kastner, American-English film producer (died 2010)
- 1934 – Jean Corbeil, Canadian lawyer and politician, 29th Canadian Minister of Labour (died 2002)
- 1934 – Tassos Papadopoulos, Cypriot lawyer and politician, 5th President of Cyprus (died 2008)
- 1935 – Kenny Davern, American clarinet player and saxophonist (died 2006)
- 1935 – Valery Kubasov, Russian engineer and astronaut (died 2014)
- 1935 – Li Shengjiao, Chinese diplomat and international jurist (died 2017)
- 1936 – Hunter Davies, Scottish author and journalist
- 1938 – Bob Boland, Australian rugby league player and coach
- 1938 – Lou Graham, American golfer
- 1938 – Rory Storm, English singer-songwriter (died 1972)
- 1941 – Iona Brown, English violinist and conductor (died 2004)
- 1941 – John Steiner, English actor (died 2022)
- 1941 – John E. Walker, English chemist and academic, Nobel Prize laureate
- 1942 – Vasily Alekseyev, Russian-German weightlifter and coach (died 2011)
- 1943 – Sadako Sasaki, Japanese survivor of the atomic bombing of Hiroshima, known for one thousand origami cranes (died 1955)
- 1944 – Mike McGear, British performing artist and rock photographer
- 1944 – Kotaro Suzumura, Japanese economist and academic (died 2020)
- 1945 – Tony Conigliaro, American baseball player (died 1990)
- 1945 – Raila Odinga, Kenyan engineer and politician, 2nd Prime Minister of Kenya (died 2025)
- 1945 – Peter Schowtka, German politician (died 2022)
- 1946 – Michele Elliott, author, psychologist and founder of child protection charity Kidscape
- 1946 – Jann Wenner, American publisher, co-founded Rolling Stone
- 1947 – Tony Elliott, English publisher, founded Time Out (died 2020)
- 1948 – Kenny Loggins, American singer-songwriter
- 1950 – Juan Gabriel, Mexican singer-songwriter (died 2016)
- 1952 – Sammo Hung, Hong Kong actor, director, producer, and martial artist
- 1953 – Robert Longo, American painter and sculptor
- 1954 – Alan Butcher, English cricketer and coach
- 1955 – Mamata Shankar, Indian-Bengali actress
- 1956 – David Caruso, American actor
- 1957 – Nicholson Baker, American novelist and essayist
- 1957 – Katie Couric, American television journalist, anchor, and author
- 1959 – Angela Smith, Baroness Smith of Basildon, English accountant and politician
- 1959 – Kathy Valentine, American bass player and songwriter
- 1960 – Loretta Sanchez, American politician
- 1961 – John Thune, American lawyer and politician
- 1962 – Aleksandr Dugin, Russian political analyst and strategist known for his fascist views
- 1962 – Ron Rivera, American football player and coach
- 1963 – Rand Paul, American politician and physician
- 1964 – Nicolas Cage, American actor
- 1965 – Five for Fighting, American singer-songwriter and pianist
- 1965 – Alessandro Lambruschini, Italian runner
- 1967 – Nick Clegg, English academic and politician, Deputy Prime Minister of the United Kingdom
- 1967 – Ricky Stuart, Australian rugby league player, coach, and sportscaster
- 1969 – Marco Simone, Italian footballer and manager
- 1970 – Andy Burnham, English politician, Prime Minister of the United Kingdom
- 1971 – Kevin Rahm, American actor
- 1971 – Jeremy Renner, American actor
- 1972 – Donald Brashear, American-Canadian ice hockey player and mixed martial artist
- 1974 – Alenka Bikar, Slovenian sprinter and politician
- 1976 – Vic Darchinyan, Armenian-Australian boxer
- 1976 – Éric Gagné, Canadian baseball player
- 1976 – Alfonso Soriano, Dominican baseball player
- 1977 – Dustin Diamond, American actor and comedian (died 2021)
- 1977 – Sofi Oksanen, Finnish author and playwright
- 1977 – Brent Sopel, Canadian ice hockey player
- 1978 – Dean Cosker, English cricketer and umpire
- 1978 – Israel Keyes, American serial killer (died 2012)
- 1979 – Reggie Austin, American actor
- 1979 – Aloe Blacc, American musician, singer, songwriter, record producer, actor, businessman and philanthropist
- 1980 – Reece Simmonds, Australian rugby league player
- 1981 – Alex Auld, Canadian ice hockey player
- 1981 – Marquis Daniels, American basketball player
- 1981 – Travis Friend, Zimbabwean cricketer
- 1982 – Lauren Cohan, American-English actress
- 1982 – Francisco Rodríguez, Venezuelan baseball player
- 1982 – Hannah Stockbauer, German swimmer
- 1983 – Brett Dalton, American actor
- 1983 – Edwin Encarnación, Dominican baseball player
- 1983 – Cappie Pondexter, American basketball player
- 1984 – Jon Lester, American baseball player
- 1985 – Lewis Hamilton, English racing driver
- 1985 – Wayne Routledge, English footballer
- 1987 – Davide Astori, Italian footballer (died 2018)
- 1987 – Stefan Babović, Serbian footballer
- 1987 – Lyndsy Fonseca, American actress
- 1988 – Haley Bennett, American actress and singer
- 1988 – Scott Pendlebury, Australian footballer
- 1990 – Liam Aiken, American actor
- 1990 – Gentleman Jack Gallagher, English mixed martial artist and wrestler
- 1990 – Gregor Schlierenzauer, Austrian ski jumper
- 1991 – Tucker Barnhart, American baseball player
- 1991 – Eden Hazard, Belgian footballer
- 1991 – Caster Semenya, South African sprinter
- 1991 – Michael Walters, Australian footballer
- 1992 – Erik Gudbranson, Canadian ice hockey player
- 1992 – Tohu Harris, New Zealand rugby league player
- 1994 – Jarnell Stokes, American basketball player
- 1994 – Lee Sun-bin, South Korean actress and singer
- 1994 – MacKenzie Weegar, Canadian ice hockey player
- 1995 – Jordan Bell, American basketball player
- 1995 – Yulia Putintseva, Kazakhstani tennis player
- 1996 – Alex Nedeljkovic, American ice hockey player
- 1997 – Ozzie Albies, Curaçaoan baseball player
- 1997 – Lamar Jackson, American football player
- 2000 – Marcus Scribner, American actor
- 2003 – Ryan Dunn, American basketball player
- 2007 – Chloe Chua, Singaporean violinist, 2018 joint 1st prize winner of the Yehudi Menuhin International Competition for Young Violinists
- 2012 – Blue Ivy Carter, American singer and actress

== Deaths ==
=== Pre-1600 ===
- 312 – Lucian of Antioch, Christian martyr, saint, and theologian (born 240)
- 838 – Babak Khorramdin, Iranian leader of the Khurramite uprising against the Abbasid Caliphate
- 856 – Aldric, bishop of Le Mans
- 1131 – Canute Lavard, Danish prince and saint (born 1096)
- 1285 – Charles I of Naples (born 1226)
- 1325 – Denis of Portugal (born 1261)
- 1355 – Inês de Castro, Castilian noblewoman (born 1325)
- 1400 – John Montagu, 3rd Earl of Salisbury, English Earl (born 1350)
- 1451 – Amadeus VIII, Duke of Savoy a.k.a. Antipope Felix V (born 1383)
- 1529 – Peter Vischer the Elder, German sculptor (born 1455)
- 1536 – Catherine of Aragon, Queen Consort of England (born 1485)
- 1566 – Louis de Blois, Flemish monk and author (born 1506)

=== 1601–1900 ===
- 1619 – Nicholas Hilliard, English painter and goldsmith (born 1547)
- 1625 – Ruggiero Giovannelli, Italian composer and author (born 1560)
- 1655 – Pope Innocent X (born 1574)
- 1658 – Theophilus Eaton, American farmer and politician, 1st Governor of the New Haven Colony (born 1590)
- 1694 – Charles Gerard, 1st Earl of Macclesfield, English general and politician, Lord Lieutenant of Gloucestershire (born 1618)
- 1700 – Raffaello Fabretti, Italian scholar and author (born 1618)
- 1715 – François Fénelon, French archbishop, theologian, and poet (born 1651)
- 1758 – Allan Ramsay, Scottish poet and playwright (born 1686)
- 1767 – Thomas Clap, American minister and academic (born 1703)
- 1770 – Carl Gustaf Tessin, Swedish politician and diplomat (born 1695)
- 1812 – Joseph Dennie, American journalist and author (born 1768)
- 1830 – John Thomas Campbell, Irish-Australian public servant and politician (born 1770)
- 1830 – Thomas Lawrence, English painter and educator (born 1769)
- 1858 – Mustafa Reşid Pasha, Ottoman politician, Grand Vizier of the Ottoman Empire (born 1800)
- 1864 – Caleb Blood Smith, American journalist and politician, 6th U.S. Secretary of the Interior (born 1808)
- 1888 – Golam Ali Chowdhury, Bengali landlord and philanthropist (born 1824)
- 1892 – Tewfik Pasha, Egyptian ruler (born 1852)
- 1893 – Josef Stefan, Slovenian physicist and mathematician (born 1835)

=== 1901–present ===
- 1912 – Sophia Jex-Blake, English physician and feminist (born 1840)
- 1919 – Henry Ware Eliot, American businessman and philanthropist, co-founded Washington University in St. Louis (born 1843)
- 1920 – Edmund Barton, Australian judge and politician, 1st Prime Minister of Australia (born 1849)
- 1927 – Nikolaos Kalogeropoulos, Greek politician, 99th Prime Minister of Greece (born 1851)
- 1931 – Edward Channing, American historian and author (born 1856)
- 1932 – André Maginot, French sergeant and politician (born 1877)
- 1936 – Guy d'Hardelot, French pianist and composer (born 1858)
- 1941 – Charles Finger, English journalist and author (born 1869)
- 1943 – Nikola Tesla, Serbian-American inventor and engineer (born 1856)
- 1951 – René Guénon, French-Egyptian philosopher and author (born 1886)
- 1960 – Dorothea Douglass Lambert Chambers, English tennis player and coach (born 1878)
- 1963 – Arthur Edward Moore, New Zealand-Australian farmer and politician, 23rd Premier of Queensland (born 1876)
- 1964 – Reg Parnell, English racing driver and manager (born 1911)
- 1967 – David Goodis, American author and screenwriter (born 1917)
- 1967 – Carl Schuricht, German-Swiss conductor (born 1880)
- 1968 – J. L. B. Smith, South African chemist and academic (born 1897)
- 1972 – John Berryman, American poet and scholar (born 1914)
- 1981 – Alvar Lidell, English journalist and radio announcer (born 1908)
- 1981 – Eric Robinson, Australian businessman and politician, 2nd Australian Minister for Finance (born 1926)
- 1984 – Alfred Kastler, German-French physicist and academic, Nobel Prize laureate (born 1902)
- 1986 – Juan Rulfo, Mexican author, screenwriter, and photographer (born 1917)
- 1988 – Zara Cisco Brough, American Nipmuc Indian chief and fashion designer (born 1919)
- 1988 – Trevor Howard, English actor (born 1913)
- 1989 – Hirohito, Japanese emperor (born 1901)
- 1990 – Bronko Nagurski, Canadian-American football player and wrestler (born 1908)
- 1992 – Richard Hunt, American puppeteer and voice actor (born 1951)
- 1995 – Murray Rothbard, American economist, historian, and theorist (born 1926)
- 1996 – Károly Grósz, Hungarian politician, 51st Prime Minister of Hungary (born 1930)
- 1998 – Owen Bradley, American record producer (born 1915)
- 1998 – Vladimir Prelog, Croatian-Swiss chemist and academic, Nobel Prize laureate (born 1906)
- 2000 – Gary Albright, American wrestler (born 1963)
- 2001 – James Carr, American singer (born 1942)
- 2002 – Avery Schreiber, American comedian and actor (born 1935)
- 2004 – Ingrid Thulin, Swedish actress (born 1926)
- 2005 – Pierre Daninos, French author (born 1913)
- 2006 – Heinrich Harrer, Austrian mountaineer, geographer, and author (born 1912)
- 2007 – Bobby Hamilton, American race car driver and businessman (born 1957)
- 2007 – Magnus Magnusson, Icelandic journalist, author, and academic (born 1929)
- 2008 – Alwyn Schlebusch, South African academic and politician, Vice State President of South Africa (born 1917)
- 2012 – Tony Blankley, British-born American child actor, journalist and pundit (born 1948)
- 2014 – Run Run Shaw, Chinese-Hong Kong businessman and philanthropist, founded Shaw Brothers Studio and TVB (born 1907)
- 2015 – Mompati Merafhe, Botswana general and politician, Vice-President of Botswana (born 1936)
- 2015 – Rod Taylor, Australian-American actor and screenwriter (born 1930)
- 2015 – Georges Wolinski, Tunisian-French cartoonist (born 1934)
- 2016 – Bill Foster, American basketball player and coach (born 1929)
- 2016 – John Johnson, American basketball player (born 1947)
- 2016 – Kitty Kallen, American singer (born 1921)
- 2016 – Judith Kaye, American lawyer and jurist (born 1938)
- 2016 – Mufti Mohammad Sayeed, Indian lawyer and politician, Indian Minister of Home Affairs (born 1936)
- 2017 – Mário Soares, Portuguese politician; 16th President of Portugal (born 1924)
- 2018 – Jim Anderton, Former New Zealand Deputy Prime Minister (born 1938)
- 2018 – France Gall, French singer (born 1947)
- 2020 – Neil Peart, Canadian drummer, songwriter, and producer (born 1952)
- 2020 – Silvio Horta, American screenwriter and television producer (born 1974)
- 2020 – Elizabeth Wurtzel, author and feminist (born 1967)
- 2021 – Michael Apted, English filmmaker (born 1941)
- 2021 – Tommy Lasorda, American baseball player, coach, and manager (born 1927)
- 2021 – Henri Schwery, Swiss cardinal (born 1932)
- 2024 – Franz Beckenbauer, German footballer and manager (born 1945)
- 2025 – Jean-Marie Le Pen, French intelligence officer and politician (born 1928)
- 2025 – Peter Yarrow, American singer-songwriter, guitarist, and producer (born 1938)
- 2026 – Glenn Hall, Canadian ice hockey goaltender (born 1931)

== Holidays and observances ==
- Christian Feast Day:
  - André Bessette (Canada)
  - Blessed Marie Thérèse Haze
  - Canute Lavard
  - Felix and Januarius
  - Lucian of Antioch
  - Raymond of Penyafort
  - Synaxis of John the Forerunner & Baptist (Julian calendar)
  - January 7 (Eastern Orthodox liturgics)
- Christmas (Eastern Orthodox Churches and Oriental Orthodox Churches using the Julian calendar, Rastafari)
  - Christmas in Russia
  - Christmas in Ukraine
  - Christmas in Serbia
  - Ethiopian Christmas
  - Remembrance Day of the Dead (Armenia)
- Distaff Day (medieval Europe)
- Pioneer's Day (Liberia)
- Tricolour Day or Festa del Tricolore (Italy)
- Victory from Genocide Day (Cambodia)
