= Miguel Martín =

Miguel Martín may refer to:

- Miguel Martín Fernández (born 1997), Spanish footballer
- Miguel Martín López (born 1967), Mexican politician

== See also ==
- Miguel Ángel Martín (disambiguation)
