= Gennaro (surname) =

Gennaro, DiGennaro, Di Gennaro, DeGennaro or De Gennaro is an Italian surname originating from the given name Gennaro. It may refer to the following notable people:

- Antonio Di Gennaro (born 1958), Italian football player
- Davide Di Gennaro (born 1988), Italian football midfielder
- Flo Gennaro (born 1991), Argentine fashion model
- Francesco Di Gennaro (born 1982), Italian football forward
- Gaetano De Gennaro (1890–1959), Italian-Brazilian sculptor
- Giovanni De Gennaro (disambiguation), multiple people
- Grace DeGennaro (born 1956), American artist
- James F. Gennaro (born 1957), American politician
- Jane Gennaro (born 1953), American artist, illustrator, playwright, writer and voice actress
- Lucrezia Gennaro (born 2001), Italian figure skater
- Matt DeGennaro (born 1969), American football player
- Matteo di Génnaro (1621–1674), Roman Catholic prelate
- Matteo Di Gennaro (born 1994), Italian football defender
- Monica De Gennaro (born 1987), Italian volleyball player
- Nick DeGennaro (born 2000), American football player
- Peter Gennaro (1919–2000), American dancer and choreographer
- Raffaele Di Gennaro (born 1993), Italian football goalkeeper
- Sandy Gennaro (born 1951), American rock drummer

== See also ==
- Genaro (surname)
