= Baptistery of San Giovanni in Fonte, Naples =

Paleochristian bapistery

Coordinates: 40°51′10.6″N 14°15′33.7″E

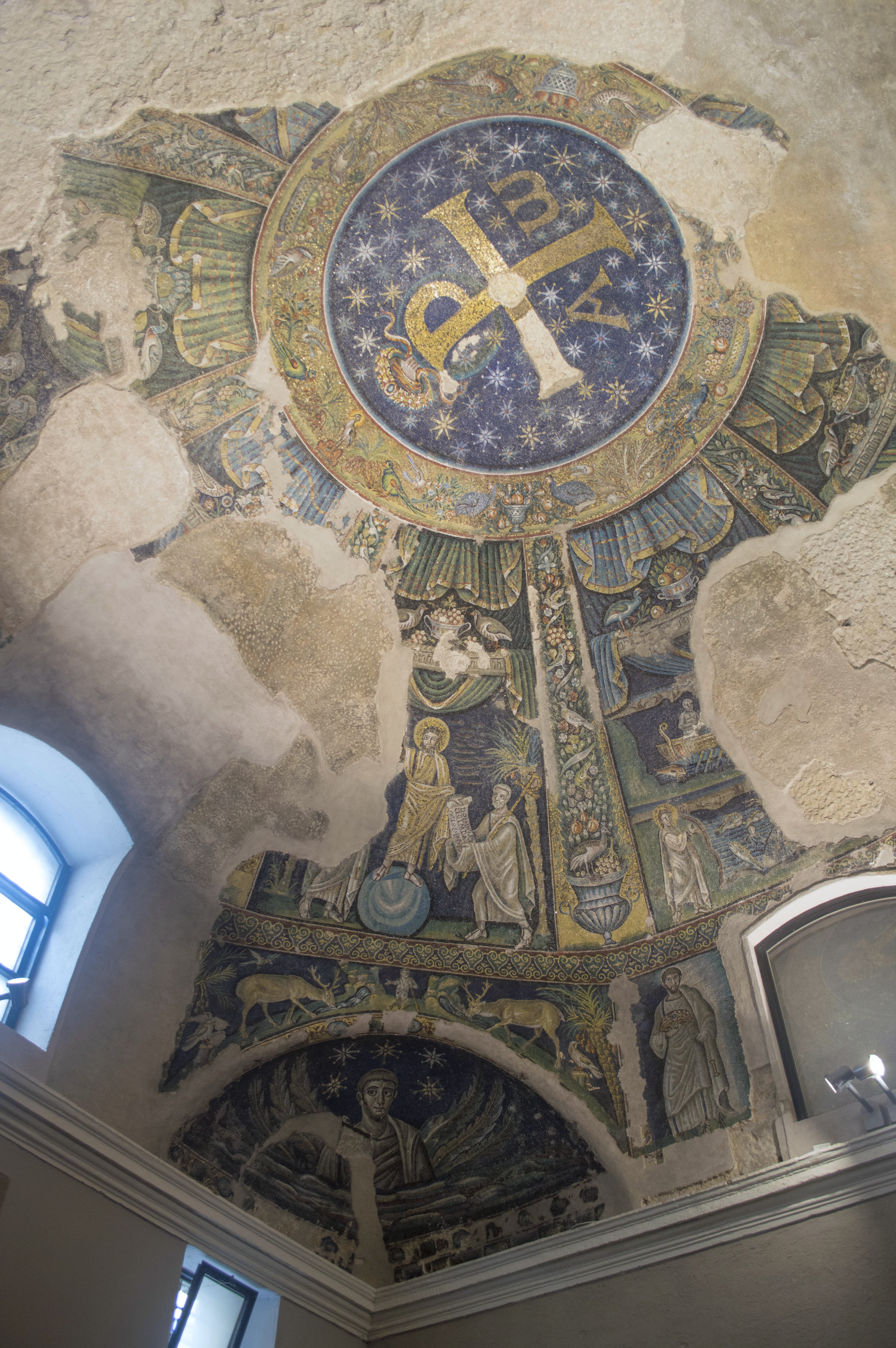
Ceiling mosaics from the baptistery of San Giovanni in Naples, Italy.

The Baptistery of San Giovanni is a Paleochristian baptistery attached to the Santa Restituta church in Naples, Italy. It is the oldest surviving baptistery from medieval Europe.

== History ==
The baptistery was likely built in the fourth century. There are conflicting accounts of who commissioned the construction of the baptistery and when. Severus, the twelfth bishop of Naples, is often credited with its construction in the late fourth century. The construction of the baptistery by Severus is chronicled in John the Deacon’s Gesta episcoporum Neapolitanorum. However, the thirteenth–fourteenth century work Chronicle of Saint Mary of the Principle, credits Constantine the Great with the building of the baptistery at the same time as the S. Restituta during the early fourth century. The architecture and mosaic style lead researchers to believe that the baptistery was more likely to have been constructed in the later fourth century. The baptistery was remodeled under the nineteenth Bishop of Naples, Soter (465–486).

== Description ==
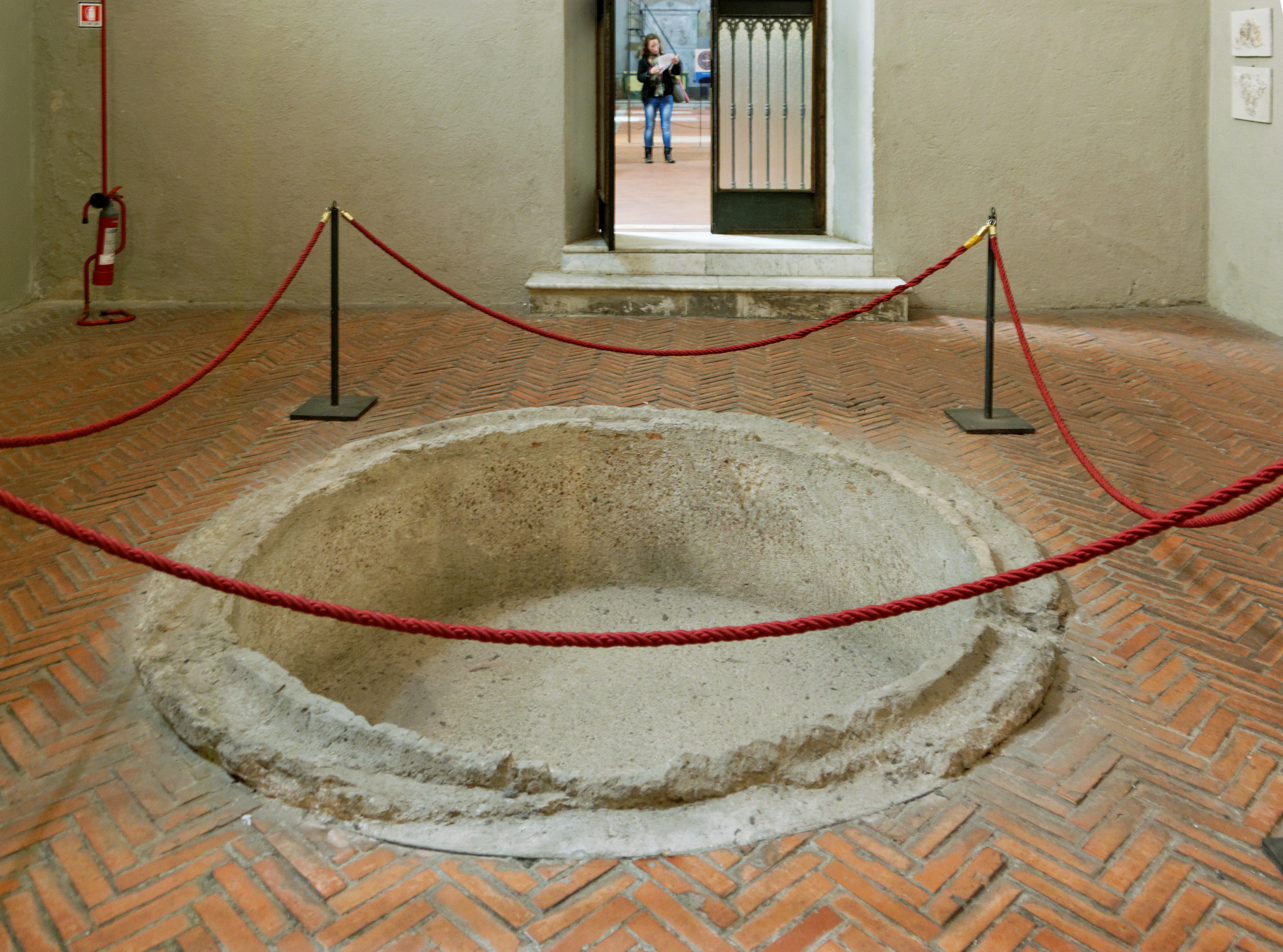
The piscina, a shallow pool where baptisms were performed.

The baptistery is approximately 7 × 7 meters. The interior is octagonal with a domed roof. The piscina, 2 meters across and 45 cm deep, is made of earthenware. The piscina was not deep enough for the baptized to be fully submerged. Instead of full immersion, the baptized stood in the piscina and the water was poured over their head three times. This is evidenced by baptism iconography located in the Roman Catacombs.

The baptistery was once a freestanding building. The original entrance consisted of two openings in the western wall. This establishes the original orientation of the building as east to west, not the north to south that we see today. This is also supported by the orientation of the mosaics. Today, one enters the baptistery through a chapel behind the main apse in S. Restituta. Additionally, the baptistery can be entered through a porch on the northern side of the building. This porch connects the baptistery to the archiepiscopal palace.

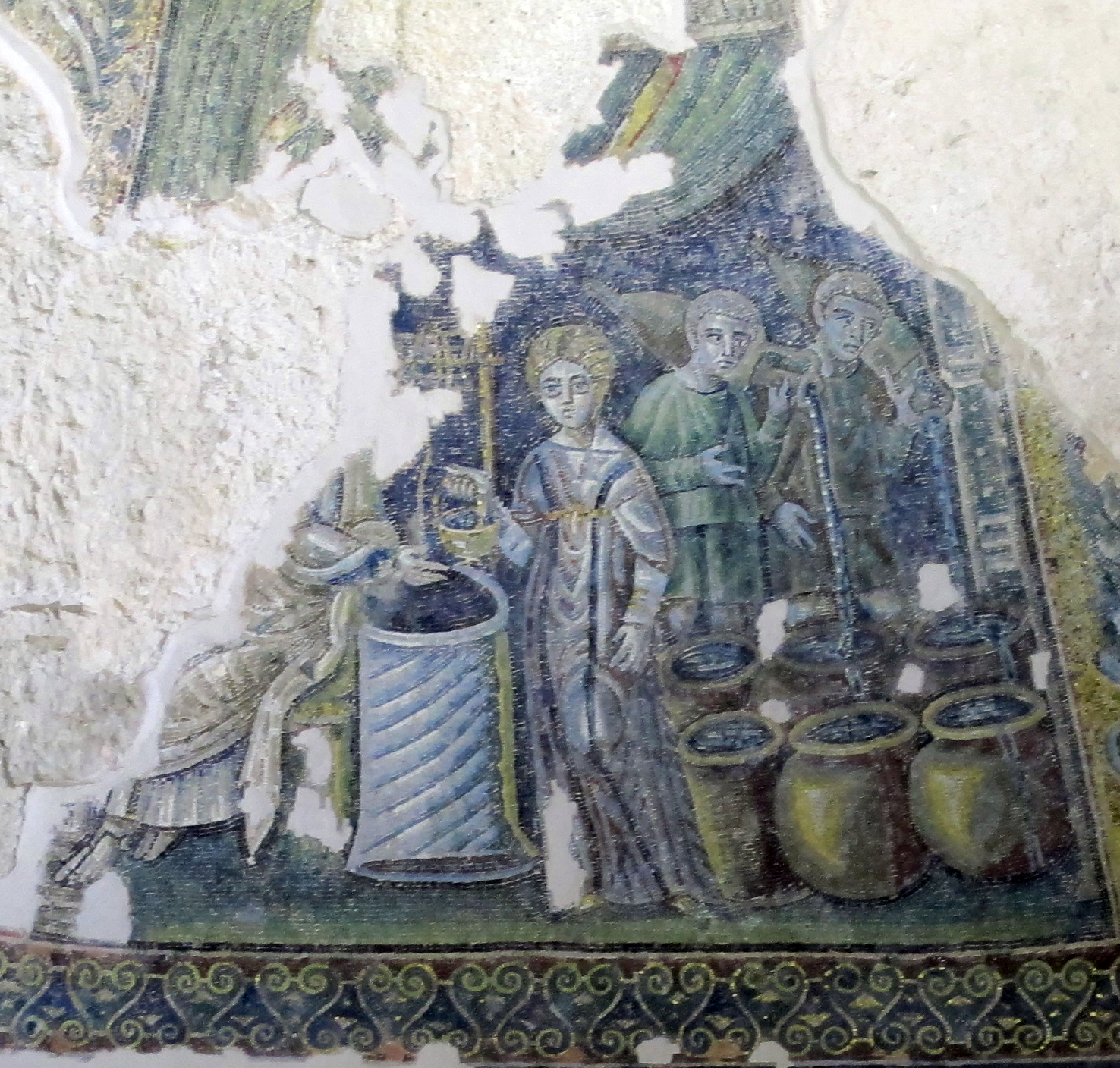
Samaritan Woman at the Well in the Baptistery of San Giovanni

== Mosaics ==
=== Dome ===
In the center of the dome roof is the Chi Rho symbol. The golden Chi Rho mosaic sits on a deep blue background and is surrounded by gold, blue, and white stars. The Chi Rho is flanked by the letters alpha and omega, in reference to Revelation 1:11. Above the Chi Rho is the hands of the Eternal Father (Dextera dei) clutching a jeweled laurel wreath wrapped in a golden ribbon.

=== Traditio Legis ===
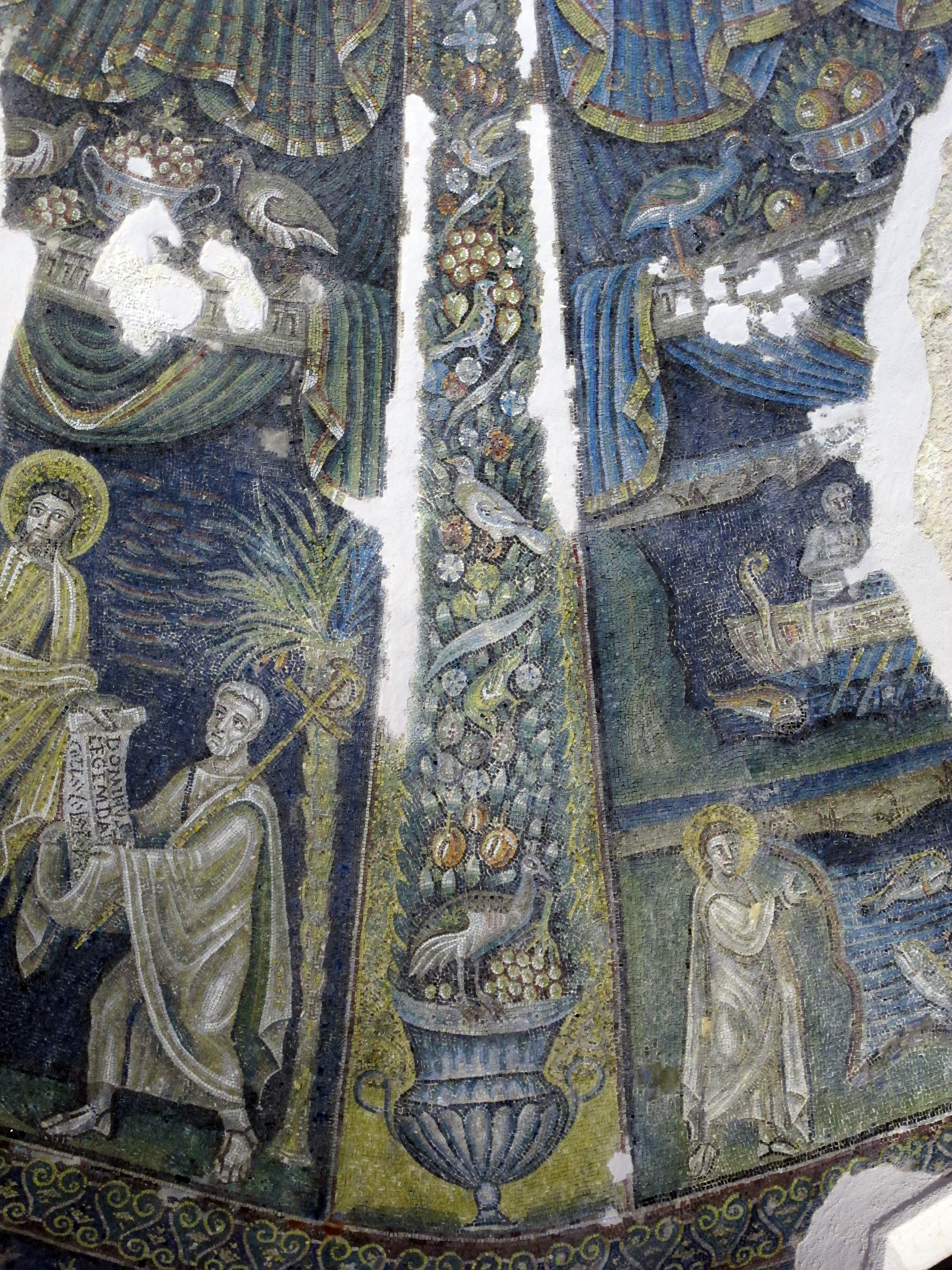
Left: Traditio Legis. Right: Miraculous Draught of Fishes or the Walking on Water.

In this scene, Jesus stands atop a blue orb and hands Saint Peter the scroll of law. Written on the scroll is Dominus Legem Dat, Latin for "the Lord gives the law". While the left side is badly damaged, it can be assumed that the figure to Jesus's left is Paul the Apostle based on early Christian iconography.

=== Biblical scenes ===
There are several mosaics of biblical scenes lining the walls beneath the dome. To the right of the Traditio Legis is a mosaic depicting either the Miraculous Draught of Fishes or perhaps Jesus Walking on Water. The scene is incomplete but shows Peter in a boat and Jesus on the shore with his hand outstretched towards fish. Without the complete mosaic, it remains unclear whether this is the Draught of Fishes, the Walking on Water scene, or a mixture of the two.

The Samaritan Woman at the Well scene is attached to the Marriage at Cana scene. While the second figure by the well is destroyed, it may be Jesus based on the Biblical story, an important baptism allegory. In this scene, Jesus offers the Samaritan Woman the water of eternal life. The Marriage at Cana depicts Jesus turning water into wine. Like the Samaritan Woman scene, this miracle displays the divine transformation of water.
