= Gennady =

- Pronunciation: [ɡʲɪˈnadʲɪj]
- Gender: Male

Origin
- Origin: Ancient Greek: Γεννάδιος; γεννάδας – Gennadios, Gennadas
- Meaning: Noble, of noble origin
- Region of origin: Byzantine (enrooted in Russian culture)

Other names
- Related names: Gennadius, Diogenes, Hermogenes, Gennaro, Hennadiy, Henadz

Gennady (Russian: Геннадий, IPA: [ɡʲɪˈnadʲɪj]), also transcribed Gennadi, Gennadiy, Hennadiy, Hienadzij, Hennady or Henadzi, is a Russian male name. It is derived from the Greek given name Γεννάδιος (Gennadios), latinized Gennadius or Italian Gennaro.

== People ==
- Gary Vee (born Gennady Vaynerchuk), American businessman
- Gennadi Bogachyov (1945–2023), Soviet and Russian actor
- Gennadi Bogachyov, Russian footballer
- Gennady Drach (born 1942), Russian scientist
- Gennadi Gagulia (1948–2018), Abkhazian politician
- Gennadi Karponosov, Soviet and Russian Olympic and world champion ice dancer and coach
- Gennadi Simov, Bulgarian cyclist
- Gennadi Sosonko, Russian-born Dutch chess grandmaster
- Gennadi Syomin (1967–2021), Russian footballer and football coach
- Gennadi Vainikko (1938–2024), Estonian mathematician
- Gennadi Vengerov, Soviet, Russian and German actor
- Gennadi Volnov, Russian basketball player
- Gennadi Yukhtin (1932–2022), Russian actor
- Gennadi Zaichik, Georgian and American chess grandmaster
- Gennady Churilov, Russian ice hockey player
- Gennady Dobrokhotov (1948–2025), Soviet boxer
- Gennady Gladkov (1935–2023), Soviet and Russian composer
- Gennady Golovkin (born 1982), Kazakh boxer
- Gennady Gudkov (born 1956), Russian politician and businessman
- Gennady Korotkevich (born 1994), Belarusian sport programmer
- Gennady Logofet, Soviet and Russian footballer and football coach
- Gennady Mikhasevich, prolific Soviet serial killer and rapist
- Gennady of Novgorod, Russian archbishop
- Gennady Padalka (born 1958), Russian cosmonaut
- Gennady Rozhdestvensky (1931–2018), Soviet and Russian conductor
- Gennady Semenovich Makanin, Russian mathematician
- Gennady Strekalov (1940–2004), Soviet cosmonaut
- Gennady Timchenko, Russian oligarch
- Gennady Ustyugov (1937–2025), Russian painter
- Gennady Vasilyev, Russian film director
- Gennady Yanayev, the only vice president of the Soviet Union
- Gennady Zyuganov, Russian political party leader and assemblyman
- Genndy Tartakovsky (born 1970), Russian-American cartoonist
- Gienek Loska (1975–2020), Belarusian and Polish singer-songwriter
- Giennadij Jerszow (born 1967), Polish and Ukrainian sculptor
- Henadzi Aliashchuk, also known as Gennady Oleshchuk, (born 1975), Belarusian weightlifter
- Henadzi Makhveyenia, also known as Gennady Makhveyenya, (born 1983), Belarusian weightlifter.
- Hennadiy Vasilyev, Ukrainian politician
