= Gennaro Giametta =

Italian painter

- Born: August 4, 1867; Frattamaggiore, Italy
- Died: February 8, 1938 (aged 70); Italy
- Occupations: Painter, politician
- Known for: Artistic work in Argentina; later political career in Italy

Gennaro Giametta (Frattamaggiore, 4 August 1867 - 8 February 1938) was an Italian painter. He worked under Pasquale Pontecorvo and Arnaldo De Lisio. He eventually moved to Buenos Aires in Argentina to work for many years. He then returned to Italy and entered politics.
