= Gennaro (disambiguation) =

Gennaro (from the Latin Januarius, meaning "devoted to Janus") may refer to

- San Gennaro, people and places named for the saint, bishop of Naples
- Gennaro (given name)
- Gennaro (surname)
- DiGennaro Communications, American communications company
- The Grand Gennaro, a novel by Garibaldi M. Lapolla

== See also ==
- Gennero, surname
