= January (given name) =

Origin
- Origin: Latin, from Janus, the god of beginnings
- Meaning: the month of January

January is a given name. It is derived from the name of the month January, which comes from Janus, a Roman god who stood for beginnings and transitions.

== People ==
- January Jones (singer), American pop singer née Jacqueline Allison
- January Jones (born 1978), American actress
- January Suchodolski (1797–1875), Polish artist
- January Thompson (born 1988), American singer

== Fictional characters ==
- January, one of the main characters in Geoffrey Chaucer's "The Merchant's Tale"
- January, an AI from the 2017 video game Prey
- January, the protagonist in Alix Harrow's The Ten Thousand Doors of January
- January, the protagonist in Emily Henry's Beach Read

== See also ==
- January (surname)
- January (disambiguation)
