= Gennaro Olivieri =

Gennaro Olivieri may refer to:

- Gennaro Olivieri (footballer)
- Gennaro Olivieri (television personality)
