= Henadz =

Henadz (Belarusian: Генадзь), also spelled Hienadź in Łacinka, is a Belarusian masculine given name. It is equivalent to the Russian name Gennady, and comes from the Greek name Gennadios.

Notable people with the name include:

- Henadz Bliznyuk (born 1980), Belarusian football coach and player
- Hienadz Buraukin (1936–2014), Belarusian poet, journalist and diplomat
- Hienadź Hrušavy (1950–2014), Belarusian academic, politician, human rights and environmental activist
- Hienadź Karpienka (1949–1999), Belarusian scientist and opposition politician
- Hienadz Kliauko (1931–1979), Soviet Belarusian poet and translator
- Henadz Laptseu (born 1998), Belarusian weightlifter
- Henadz Mardas (1970–2020), Belarusian football player and coach
- Henadz Maroz (born 1978), Belarusian high jumper
- Henadz Navitski (born 1949), Belarusian politician
- Hienadź Sahanovič (born 1961), Belarusian historian
- Hienadz Shutau (1975–2020), Belarusian protester shot dead
- Henadz Valyukevich (1958–2019), Belarusian triple jumper
