= Ustyugov =

Ustyugov (Russian: Устюгов) is a Russian masculine surname, its feminine counterpart is Ustyugova. Notable people with the surname include:

- Aleksandr Ustyugov (born 1976), Russian actor, film director and musician
- Evgeny Ustyugov (born 1985), Russian biathlete
- Gennady Ustyugov (1937–2025), Russian painter
- Sergey Ustiugov (born 1992), Russian cross-country skier
