= Januarie =

Januarie may refer to:

- Ricky Januarie (born 1982), South African rugby player
- Januarie, the main character in Chaucer's The Merchant's Tale
  - The Tale of Januarie, a 2017 opera based on The Merchant's Tale

== See also ==
- January (disambiguation)
