= Genaro Ruiz =

Genaro Ruiz may refer to:

- Genaro Ruiz Arriaga, Mexican politician
- Genaro Ruiz Camacho, cannabis dealer and organized crime leader in Texas
