= Hennadiy =

Hennadiy (Ukrainian: Геннадій, IPA: [ɦenˈnɑd(ʲ)ij]) is a Ukrainian given name. Like the Russian variant Gennady it is derived from Gennadius. Notable people with the name include:

- Hennadiy Altman (born 1979), Ukrainian football goalkeeper
- Hennadiy Avdyeyenko (born 1963), Ukrainian high jumper
- Hennadiy Balashov (1961–2025), Ukrainian businessman and politician
- Hennadiy Horbenko (1975–2025), Ukrainian hurdler
- Hennadiy Krasylnykov (born 1977), Ukrainian weightlifter
- Hennadiy Lytovchenko (born 1963), Ukrainian footballer and football coach
- Hennadiy Medvedyev (born 1975), Ukrainian footballer
- Hennadiy Moroz (born 1975), Ukrainian footballer
- Hennadiy Orbu (born 1970), Ukrainian footballer
- Hennadiy Perepadenko (born 1964), Ukrainian footballer
- Hennadiy Popovych (1973–2010), Ukrainian footballer
- Hennadiy Udovenko (1931–2013), Ukrainian politician and diplomat
- Hennadiy Zubov (born 1977), Ukrainian footballer
