= January (surname) =

January is a surname. It is derived from the name of the month, which comes from Janus, a Roman god who stood for beginnings and transitions.

== People ==
- Briann January (born 1987), American professional basketball player
- Don January (1929–2023), American professional golfer
- Glenn January (born 1983), Canadian professional football player
- Lois January (1912–2006), American actress
- One of three brothers who were American amateur soccer players:

- Charles January (1888–1970)
- John January (1882–1917)
- Thomas January (1886–1957)

=== Fictional ===
- Annie January, also known as Starlight, a character from The Boys franchise
  - Donna January, the mother of Annie January in The Boys

== See also ==
- January (given name)
- January (disambiguation)
