= Antonio Laviada Hernández =

Mexican politician

- Born: 22 May 1961 (age 65); Veracruz, Mexico
- Education: ITESM Querétaro
- Occupation: Politician
- Political party: PAN

Íñigo Antonio Laviada Hernández (born 22 May 1961) is a Mexican politician from the National Action Party (PAN).

In the 2006 general election he was elected to the Chamber of Deputies to represent the third district of Veracruz during the 60th Congress.
