= Arnaldo De Lisio =

Italian painter

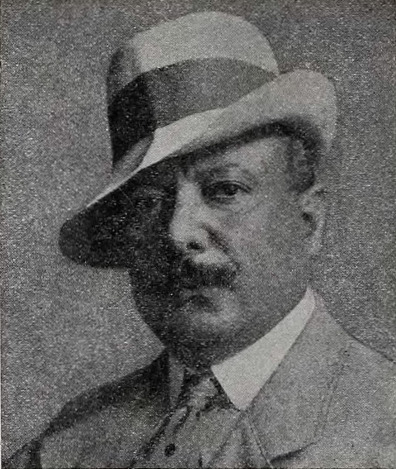
- Born: 9 December 1869; Castelbottaccio
- Died: 5 March 1949 (aged 79); Naples
- Occupation: Painter

Arnaldo De Lisio (9 December 1869 – 5 March 1949) was an Italian painter.

He was born in Castelbottaccio, Molise. His style was influenced by the works of Domenico Morelli, Ignazio Perrici, and Gioacchino Toma. He traveled to Paris with Pietro Scoppetta and Ragione at the turn of the century, where he was influenced by Impressionism and completed colorful paintings of urban vistas. He returned to Italy and painted also portraitist and genre scenes. He painted frescoes for the Banca d'Italia and Istituto Pilla of Campobasso, for the Santuario Maria Santissima di Campiglione in the town of Caivano in 1938, and the ceiling of the Teatro Savoia in Campobasso.
