= 3rd federal electoral district of Veracruz =

Federal electoral district of Mexico

Veracruz's 3rd
- Electoral district of the Chamber of Deputies of Mexico

- 3rd district since 2023

Incumbent
- Member: Magaly Armenta Oliveros
- Party: ▌Morena
- Congress: 66th (2024–2027)

District
- State: Veracruz
- Head town: Cosoleacaque
- Coordinates: 20°57′N 97°24′W
- Covers: 11 municipalities: Acayucan, Chinameca, Cosoleacaque, Isla, Juan Rodríguez Clara, Playa Vicente, San Juan Evangelista, Santiago Sochiapan, Sayula de Alemán, Soconusco, Zaragoza
- PR region: Third
- Precincts: 250
- Population: 449,270 (2020 census)

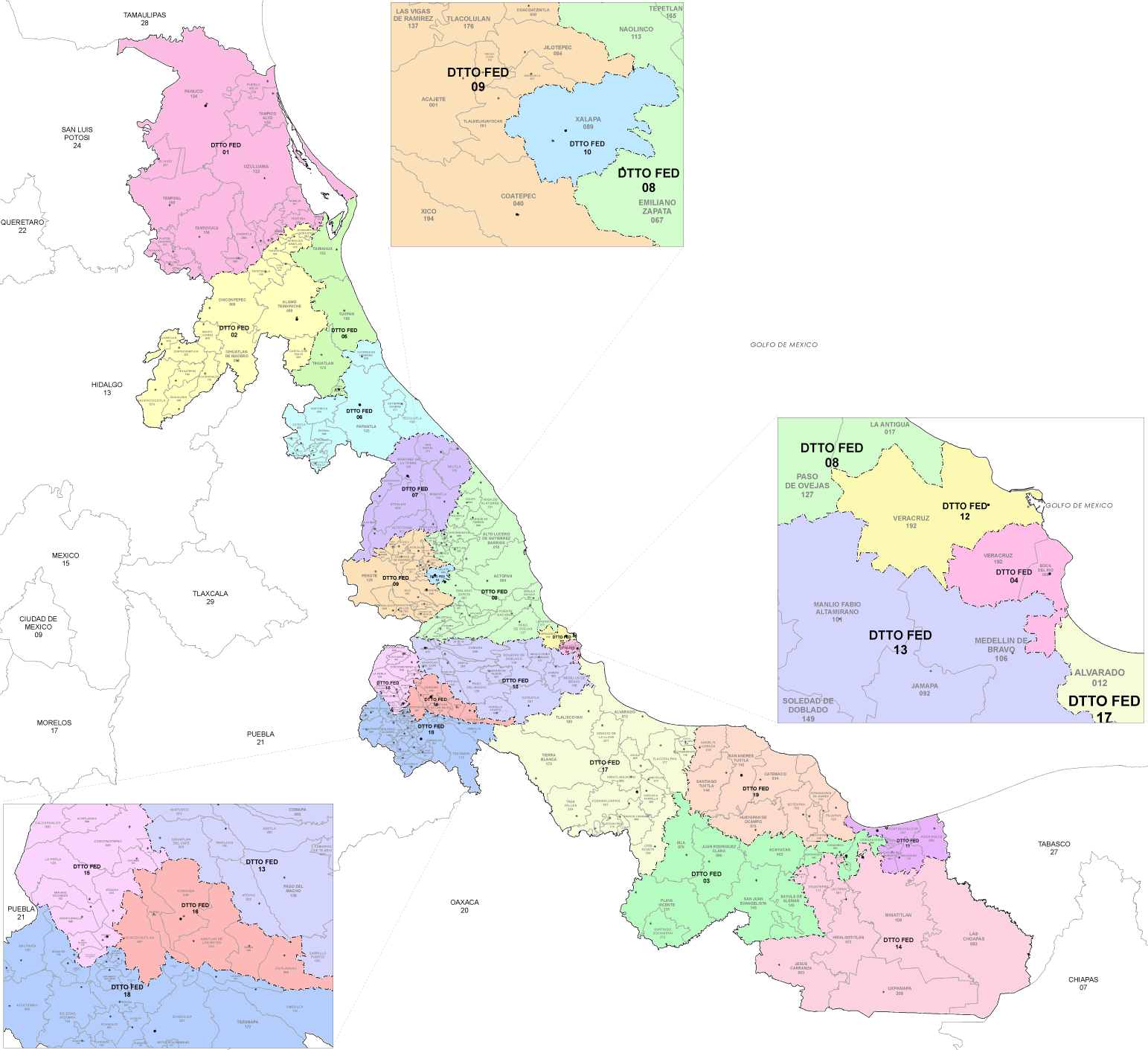
Federal electoral districts of Veracruz since 2023

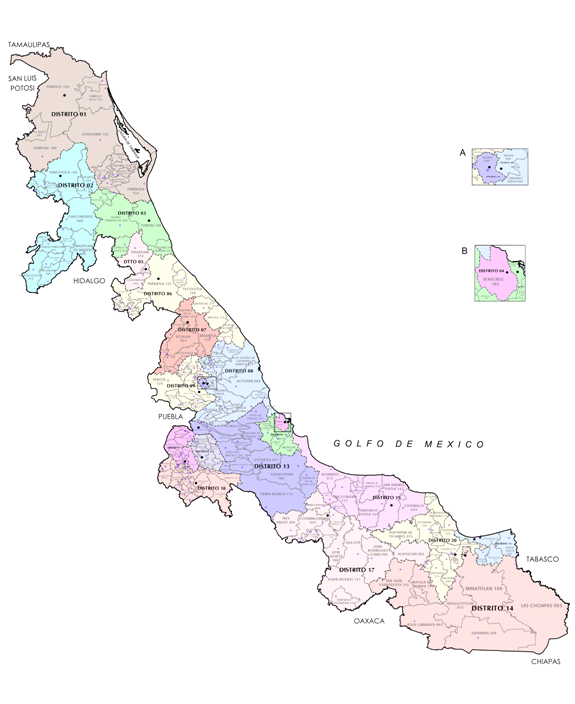
Veracruz under the 2017–2022 districting plan

The 3rd federal electoral district of Veracruz (Spanish: Distrito electoral federal 03 de Veracruz) is one of the 300 electoral districts into which Mexico is divided for elections to the federal Chamber of Deputies and one of 19 such districts in the state of Veracruz.

It elects one deputy to the lower house of Congress for each three-year legislative session by means of the first-past-the-post system. Votes cast in this district also count towards the calculation of proportional representation ("plurinominal") deputies elected from the third region.

The current member for the district, elected in the 2024 general election, is Magaly Armenta Oliveros. Originally elected for the Ecologist Green Party of Mexico (PVEM), she switched to the National Regeneration Movement (Morena) at the start of the congressional session on 1 September 2024.

== District territory ==
Veracruz lost a congressional district in the 2023 districting plan adopted by the National Electoral Institute (INE), which is to be used for the 2024, 2027 and 2030 elections. The reconfigured 3rd district covers 250 electoral precincts (secciones electorales) across 11 municipalities in the Olmeca and Papaloapan regions in the south of the state:

- Acayucan, Chinameca, Cosoleacaque, Isla, Juan Rodríguez Clara, Playa Vicente, San Juan Evangelista, Santiago Sochiapan, Sayula de Alemán, Soconusco and Zaragoza.

The head town (cabecera distrital), where results from individual polling stations are gathered together and tallied, is the city of Cosoleacaque. The district reported a population of 449,270 in the 2020 census.

== Previous districting schemes ==
Evolution of electoral district numbers
	1974	1978	1996	2005	2017	2023
Veracruz	15	23	23	21	20	19
Chamber of Deputies	196	300				

Because of shifting demographics, Veracruz currently has four fewer districts than the 23 the state was allocated under the 1977 electoral reforms.

2017–2022

Between 2017 and 2022, Veracruz was assigned 20 electoral districts. The 3rd district was located in the north of the state, comprising six municipalities in the Huasteca Baja and Totonaca regions:
- Álamo Temapache, Castillo de Teayo, Cazones de Herrera, Cerro Azul, Tepetzintla and Tuxpan.
The head town was the city of Tuxpan de Rodríguez Cano.

2005–2017

Veracruz's allocation of congressional seats fell to 21 in the 2005 redistricting process. Between 2005 and 2017 the district had its head town at Tuxpan and it covered six municipalities:
- Álamo Temapache, Cazones de Herrera, Cerro Azul, Tamiahua, Tepetzintla and Tuxpan.

1996–2005

Under the 1996 districting plan, which allocated Veracruz 23 districts, the head town was at Temapache and the district covered 7 municipalities.

1978–1996

The districting scheme in force from 1978 to 1996 was the result of the 1977 electoral reforms, which increased the number of single-member seats in the Chamber of Deputies from 196 to 300. Under that plan, Veracruz's seat allocation rose from 15 to 23. The 3rd district had its head town at Poza Rica and it covered the municipalities of Poza Rica and Coatzintla.

== Deputies returned to Congress ==
(Mexico) National parties
- Current
- PAN
- PRI
- PT
- PVEM
- MC
- Morena
- PAZ
- Somos
- Defunct or local only
- PLM
- PNR
- PRM
- PNM
- PP
- PPS
- PARM
- PFCRN
- CON
- PANAL
- PSD
- PES
- PES
- PRD

Veracruz's 3rd district
Election	Deputy	Party	Term	Legislature
1916	Enrique Meza (alternate of Adalberto Tejeda)		1916–1917	Constituent Congress of Querétaro
...
1973	Ignacio Mendoza Aguirre	Institutional Revolutionary Party	1973–1976	49th Congress
1976	Emilio Salgado Zubiaga	Institutional Revolutionary Party	1976–1979	50th Congress
1979	Óscar Torres Pancardo	Institutional Revolutionary Party	1979–1982	51st Congress
1982	Mauro Melo Barrios	Institutional Revolutionary Party	1982–1985	52nd Congress
1985	Américo Rodríguez García	Institutional Revolutionary Party	1985–1988	53rd Congress
1988	Vicente Sequera Mercado	Institutional Revolutionary Party	1988–1991	54th Congress
1991	Edmundo Sosa López	Institutional Revolutionary Party	1991–1994	55th Congress
1994	Zaida Alicia Llado Castillo	Institutional Revolutionary Party	1994–1997	56th Congress
1997	Salvador Moctezuma Andrade	Institutional Revolutionary Party	1997–2000	57th Congress
2000	Martha Silvia Sánchez González	Institutional Revolutionary Party	2000–2003	58th Congress
2003	Alfonso Sánchez Hernández	Institutional Revolutionary Party	2003–2006	59th Congress
2006	Antonio Laviada Hernández	National Action Party (Mexico)	2006–2009	60th Congress
2009	Miguel Martín López	National Action Party (Mexico)	2009–2012	61st Congress
2012	Genaro Ruiz Arriaga	Institutional Revolutionary Party	2012–2015	62nd Congress
2015	Alberto Silva Ramos (Note: Silva Ramos took a leave of absence from his seat from March to October 2016.); Alberto Vázquez Villalobos; Alberto Silva Ramos	Institutional Revolutionary Party	2015–2016; 2016; 2016–2018	63rd Congress
2018	Bertha Espinoza Segura	National Regeneration Movement	2018–2021	64th Congress
2021	Bertha Espinoza Segura (Note: Espinoza Segura died in office on 13 September 2022; she was replaced by her substitute, Hernández Villanueva.); Rocío Hernández Villanueva	National Regeneration Movement	2021–2022; 2022–2024	65th Congress
2024	Magaly Armenta Oliveros (Note: Originally elected for the PVEM, Armenta Oliveros switched to Morena at the start of the congressional session on 1 September 2024.)	Ecologist Green Party of Mexico National Regeneration Movement	2024–2027	66th Congress

== Presidential elections ==
Veracruz's 3rd district
Election	District won by	Party or coalition	%
2018	Andrés Manuel López Obrador	Juntos Haremos Historia	52.5030
2024	Claudia Sheinbaum Pardo	Sigamos Haciendo Historia	78.2685
