= Gennero =

Gennero is a surname of Italian origin. Notable people with the surname include:

- Carlos Gennero (born 1979), an Argentine cyclist.
- Lorenzo Gennero (born 1997), an Italian snowboarder.

== See also ==
- Gennaro (disambiguation)
