= Bertha Espinoza Segura =

Mexican politician (1957–2022)

Member of the Chamber of Deputies of Mexico
- In office 1 September 2018 – 13 September 2022
- Preceded by: Alberto Silva Ramos
- Succeeded by: Rocío Hernández Villanueva
- Constituency: 3rd federal electoral district of Veracruz

Personal details
- Born: María Bertha Espinoza Segura; 15 November 1957; Álamo, Veracruz, Mexico
- Died: 13 September 2022 (aged 64); Mexico City, Mexico
- Political party: Morena

María Bertha Espinoza Segura (15 November 1957 – 13 September 2022) was a Mexican politician, born in Álamo, Veracruz.

A member of Morena, she was elected to the Chamber of Deputies to represent the third district of Veracruz in the 2018 general election, and she was re-elected to the same seat in the 2021 mid-terms.

Espinoza died of cancer in Mexico City on 13 September 2022, at the age of 64.
