= Pasquale Pontecorvo =

Italian painter

Pasquale Pontecorvo (born1833) was an Italian painter and decorator; he was prolific in decorating historical and sacred subjects in oil and fresco. He also performed many restorations.

== Biography ==
He was born in Naples and completed studies in decoration and figure in the Royal Institute of Fine Arts of Naples, under professors Salvatore Montullo and Vincenzo Palliotti. During his studies he obtained honorable mentions: he fought in the wars of Italian Independence, battling the Bourbons at the Battle of Volturnus (1860). Among his works are: frescoes in the hall of the Provincial Council of Foggia and of a hall in the Provincial Council of Avellino; paintings for the church of Spirito Santo e Torre; restoration of the frescoes in the Congregation of San Giuseppe Maggiore (no longer extant); decorations of the reception hall of the City of Naples (1861), and the decoration of the city hall of Afragola. For the visit of the Empress Maria Alexandrovna of Russia to Naples, he decorated the Hotel Tramontano of Sorrento, and the council hall of the town hall of San Valentino Torio. He painted frescoes in the church of the Congregazione dei 33 Sacerdoti of Naples and in the church of the Rosario in Padula.
