= Vaklush Tolev =

- Born: 7 January 1923; Popovitsa, Plovdiv, Kingdom of Bulgaria
- Died: 27 November 2013 (aged 90); Sofia, Bulgaria
- Resting place: Sofia
- Education: Sofia University, Bulgaria
- Known for: Way of Wisdom Society; History and Theory of the Religions; The Seven Rays of Evolution; Nur; Esoteric Schools and Mystic Teachings
- Scientific career
- Fields: Culture; Natural philosophy; Religion; History; Mythology
- Workplaces: Sofia University; Plovdiv University

Vaklush Tolev (Vaklush Tolev Zapryanov, Bulgarian: Ваклуш Толев Запрянов), also known as Vaklush, The Teacher of Wisdom, was a theologian by education, a public figure, a university lecturer, and an author of a multitude of works of religious, philosophical, cultural and historical nature.

Some of his work includes ‘The History and Theory of Religions’ (in three volumes), ‘The Spiritual Gifts of Bulgaria’ (in two volumes), ‘The Seven Rays of the Evolution’, ‘Uncovenanted Testament’, to name but a few, as wells as of the magazine, ‘Nur’, composed entirely of his original materials.

On his path as an enlightener and spiritual teacher, Vaklush Tolev formed his original views and his interpretation of history, social ideas, and analyses into a whole teaching of personal, social, and universal nature, which he called The Way of Wisdom – an expression of the Spiritual Wave of Wisdom already at work within the life of humanity. Inspired by Vaklush Tolev's ideas, an association, ‘The Way of Wisdom Society’, was established. The society works to achieve the unfolding of the spiritual potential of the Bulgarian nation as well as the guiding principles in the spiritual and cultural evolution of humanity.

The followers of the Teaching of Wisdom call themselves and others ‘sabozhnitsi’ (that is ‘co-deities’): ‘The co-deity is God, Whom we seek within ourselves, manifested in the face of the other’. This is how the author formulates the kernel of the concept in an aphorism-like thought.

== Biography ==
Vaklush Tolev was born on January 7, 1923, which was the Day of the Nativity by the old Julian calendar, in the village of Popovitsa (known as Papazli until 1934), in Plovdiv county.

His family was wealthy and well respected: his grandfather, Zapryan, was the mayor of Popovitsa, while his father, Tolyo, was well known for his incredible generosity and nobility. His mother, Vasilka, who was also from an affluent family, was a woman with leadership skills, intuition, and imagination, according to Tolev.

Etymologically, the name ‘Vaklush’ is said to point to either the word 'Vlach' (Romanian origin ‘vakul’- ‘black, black-eyed, swarthy’) or to be connected to Bacchus – the Latin name of the ancient Greek (or Thracian) god Dionysius, spelled in Greek as Βάκχος (which in turn is read as Vákhos) – and has its root ‘vak, bak’ in Sanskrit, meaning ‘higher spiritual power’.

Due to his immense desire to learn, Vaklush began attending school even before reaching the minimum age requirement for elementary school. Initially, he was admitted just as an observer, but later, with the official permission of the Ministry of Education, he was admitted as a fully participating student.

Later on, he would admit that the things he was taught at school were not exactly what he longed for. However, the two things that truly provoked admiration and joy to the point of tears in him were ‘that great mystery of learning that a goddess is born from the head, and not from the womb – the goddess of Wisdom,’ or ‘to read that a created person dared to steal an apple of knowledge before the face of their Creator.’

=== Secondary School Years ===
At age 13, Vaklush enrolled in a grammar school in Asenovgrad. While there, he was impressed by the town's legal and court system and frequently went to listen to defense speeches.

At age 14, he took the floor alone at a church festivity and delivered a sermon titled ‘Does God exist?’

Within two or three years he had become president of the school's Christian Philosophical Society, which organized the presentation of papers followed by active discussions and disputes in a ‘consensual form of conflict without hatred’ with representatives of the materialist viewpoint, the Remsists (of the RMC/The Worker's Youth League).

During his secondary school years, he took part in the political life of the younger generation at that time. He subscribed to magazines like ‘Nation, Politics’, ‘Labour and Faith’, and others.

In 1939, he attended a conference to reach an agreement between the different political wings. In the same period, he began to write secret poetry.

One verse written by Vaklush, which has remained from 1945, goes as follows:

„	By winds it will be buffeted in this life – this way and that – my secret destiny and stabbed will be by those who bear a knife: my thoughts, my feelings, and my holy mystery.	"

=== Military education ===
In 1942, he relocated from Asenovgrad to Panagiurishte due to a political conflict involving the distribution of leaflets. He graduated from secondary school there, and the following year (1943), he commenced the standard military service of 18 months in the School for Reserve Officers.

Vaklush Tolev sums up military education by saying, ‘It awakes a sense of service beyond one’s own personal world.’ As well as part of a physical and spiritual growing into manhood’, it gives a broadening of one’s horizon and a sense of responsibility.

He was drafted into the Second World War in 1944 as a platoon commander in the 21st regiment, Smolyan, of the 1st Army. He did not bear or use arms. 50 soldiers were entrusted to him, and he returned them all alive – only one was wounded, and that was for looting. (He had taken the boots of a slain German soldier.)

=== The period of repressions ===
Before the military operations, Vaklush Tolev had been accepted into the legal faculty of the University of Sofia, where he was supposed to begin his studies in the autumn of 1944.

After the events of September 9, 1944, and the change of regime, he was put on trial before the People's Court because of his political views and actions as an officer in the army of the Bulgarian Monarchy. The court pronounced the defendant guilty – ‘An enemy of the people’. The sentence was ‘Death,’ and to serve as an example for others, as was the custom on occasion at the time, the loudspeakers in the courtroom were turned on to boom out the sentence. The young man had the right to some last words, the expectation being that he would be crushed by the sentence pronounced. But from the loudspeakers boomed his answer, that he was going to fight an ideological war against communism until the complete annihilation of this ideology. It was precisely this display of daring that led to his sentence being annulled: they let him live with the idea of breaking him in the prison system. The following period of his life he has defined as ‘Heaven’s caring, by means of social repression,’ because instead of wounding him, these years in prison helped him preserve his selfhood. Apart from that, ‘I was spared from absent-mindedness,’ concluded Vaklush.

He dedicated a large chunk of his prison time to studying for the law exams at Sofia University, but as he was by now a convict, his exclusion from the ranks of universities was not long in coming.

In his years in prison, he also wrote poetry, plays, and philosophical essays, and worked on several languages – English, German, French, Latin, and Old Bulgarian. He devoted three years to the study of Marxism/Leninism in order to extract its essence. He formulated three main pillars of the ideology: godlessness, class struggle, and armed revolution in order to take power. It is precisely these concepts that undermine the moral values provided by religions and ethical teachings, concluded Vaklush.

After the trial, he was sent to the Plovdiv prison, which was almost exclusively filled with political prisoners, mainly from the National Legions movement, as well as some former ministers and journalists – around 500 people in total. The first great act of rebellion that Vaklush carried out was when ideological violence and аbuse were employed so the convicted men would sign an appeal to their fathers, mothers, brothers, and sisters, calling them to go to the urns and vote for the Fatherland Front (a political organization under the wing of the Communist Party).

When they were assembled to sign, he urged everyone who was not in agreement to exit the room, and around 150 left along with him. After about a week, the decree came from the Ministry of Justice for him and 7 others to be transferred to the Pazardzhik penitentiary, where they were isolated in solitary cells for a period. This was a method of terrifying, breaking, and recruiting a person, commented Vaklush Tolev. Then, his oft-repeated thought was born: ‘When you are sufficient unto yourself, no one can vanquish you.’ ‘This means that your spirit must be free,’ he explained. The feeling of fear did not exist for him, and that's why ‘any kind of constraint, even if it be the Great Wall of China, is no obstacle.’

He carried out hunger strikes, fastings, and a day of complete silence every Monday (in Belene and Shumen)... Plovdiv, Pazardzhik, Kardzhali, Shumen, Belene, Varna – he was moved from prison to prison with a file that read ‘Not amenable to political re-education.’ ‘I changed places of worship,’ Vaklush would later say. ‘For me, they were places of worship because their inner prayer was a matter of judgment and not of genuflexion before an altar.’ When he was asked in Varna where he had felt best, he answered: ‘Places where there was a law, that’s where I felt best. Because the law, when applied by you, protects us.’

=== Ecclesiastical education ===
After an amnesty was passed for political prisoners, he was released from prison on 15 August 1956, the Feast of the Dormition of the Mother of God, in Varna. Once more, he began work in Plovdiv, moving from place to place as someone inconvenient to the authorities. While still in prison, people had always gathered around him to listen to his analyses and ideas, something that continued after his release as well.

Since he had a conviction, the right to study at any university in the country was denied to him.

Later, with great difficulty, as ‘an enemy of the people,' he graduated in Theology from the Theological Seminary in Sofia, the only autonomous institute of learning at the time. He completed five years' worth of the program in only 18 months.

During his first year, he was already banned from continuing his studies on the orders of the Central Committee of the Communist Party, but he was later reinstated after interventions from people at the highest levels of the administration who were inspired by and respected his character. He graduated in 1968 with a speech/sermon, taking its title from the Biblical expression of Pontius Pilate, ‘Ecce Homo’ – ‘Behold the Man.’

=== Ecclesiastical Work ===
At the beginning of the 70s, he was appointed by Patriarch Cyril as librarian in the Plovdiv metropolitan archdiocese. Until then, there had been no full-time librarian, and the library stock of around 15,000 items had been more like a warehouse, without any organization according to the criteria that a library stock requires, without up-to-date records of periodical publications, and virtually without readers. Vaklush Tolev, in the space of a few months, carried out ‘a general reorganization’, starting with the cleaning and repair of the reading room, followed by the stock processing. The activity of the library expanded to such an extent that students began to make their way there for the purpose of coursework, and many people came to write academic papers and dissertations on literature and Slavic philology, including the Russian consul, who at the time was preparing his dissertation on Prince Tseretelev.

Subsequently, Vaklush Tolev also became the main official responsible for the early printed artifacts, manuscripts, and icon assets of the whole Plovdiv metropolitan archdiocese, which governs 5 ecclesiastical provinces in the form of its subordinated dioceses and subdivisions, churches, monasteries and so on. Around 25,000 icons were cataloged within a few years, and 12,000 manuscripts and early print artifacts were. Thus, the idea was born of creating a depot to preserve the most valuable icons, while the other metropolitan archdioceses also began to work according to his system of item description and record-keeping. They also began to appoint their own restorers. In liaison with the Department of Culture of the Municipal Council of Plovdiv, the first exhibition of icons was also opened.

=== Lecturing ===
After 10 years of serving the Metropolitan Archdiocese, Vaklush left of his own will. Once again, he worked in various places to earn a living but always bearing his freedom within, as he would say.

After the events of 10 November 1989, he got actively involved with the party ‘Bulgarian Democratic Forum,’ the heir to the Bulgarian Legions. In 1991, he was invited to give lectures on the history of religions at the Universities of Plovdiv and Sofia. The people around Vaklush Tolev gradually began to attempt the organization of public lectures and speeches in different cities as well as their documentation by means of audio and video recordings, while from 1992 a start was made on publishing projects as well. The need for an organized existence led to the creation of a social body, which has undergone development over the years – both in terms of name and in terms of structure. Today, it is the non-profit association ‘The Way of Wisdom Society’.

=== Ending ===
Vaklush Tolev ‘remained forever’ in this world on the 27th of November 2013. Following his wishes, he was cremated on the 31st of July 2014, and a portion of his ashes was scattered at the Cliffs of Orpheus in the Rhodope mountain range, Pamporovo.

On more than one occasion, he had quoted a verse of his with which he wished to be sent on his final journey (and it has been honored):

„	Then let the stone above my grave where a passing wayfarer will want to read have no inscription, since spirit and a flame ablaze have been my path, have been my every deed.	"

== Social Ideas ==
=== Co-deity (‘sabozhnik’ in Bulgarian) ===
‘Wisdom bears with it the principle of knowledge’ summarises Vaklush Tolev – ‘not forgiveness for sin, but the knowledge of how not to sin’. The source of this knowledge is ‘intuition, which brings insight’, while the human being in the doctrine of Wisdom is considered as ‘a god in evolution’. ‘The human being as evolving god will not develop with the opposing of Good and Evil, but will be freed of polarities’, he maintains. In this regard, Vaklush also provides the new concept of ‘co-deity’ (‘sabozhnik’) – an expression of the recognition that ‘You cannot deny the Creator Himself, who has instilled Himself in the Other through the Divine Breath.’ Spiritual Kinship is more important than that of blood, therefore the human being in the Teaching of Wisdom is no longer ‘brother’ or ‘sister’, but namely a co-deity, while what's even more important is that in the transmutation brought about by the new term, the concept of ‘enemy’ is eliminated.

=== The Temple House of the 13 Immortal Bulgarians Honoured by Name ===
It was Vaklush's idea that a Day be designated and a House erected for the 13 Named Immortal Bulgarians in the country's national history ‘distinguished through an insight into their destiny’ and ‘determined not by biography, but by aspects of character.’ To establish together a Day and a Temple House of immortal figures is ‘an unavoidable necessity not for the sake of survival, but for the sake of a new historical existence,’ says Vaklush Tolev. Because ‘A people without temples is like a child without a home – if it does not become aware of the necessity of a temple, it will vegetate.’

=== The Rights of the Soul ===
In connection with humanity as a whole, Vaklush Tolev turned to the United Nations Commission on Human Rights about including an additional clause in the Charter of Human Rights, which would protect the Rights of the Soul. ‘It is the human being who is sacred and not the institution!’ – said the theologian, thus laying out the right to and basis for a change in the laws of the Institution. The request for a new clause includes the removal of anathema from all religions and the elimination of the concept of ‘enemy’ from the social relations between people. ‘Humanity enters the Third Millennium with a new Table of Moral Values – there is no evil, there is only unevolved good; there is no enemy, there is a co-deity.’ – maintains Vaklush Tolev and foresees that ‘in the Third Millennium enmity will be only internal – within one’s own self, and will last until the complete victory of the conscience.’

== The association: ‘The Way of Wisdom Society’ ==
‘The Way of Wisdom Society’ is a voluntary, independent, apolitical and non-religious non-profit association. It is the leading social and practical expression of the Teaching of Wisdom transmitted throughout the years by Vaklush Tolev via the lectures and speeches he delivered across the whole of Bulgaria and by his participation in conferences, symposiums and round tables concerning the problems of spirituality, with articles, interviews, documentary films and print publications.

The association was established under the name ‘The Way of Wisdom Society’ on the 13-th of October 1999 in the capital city Sofia, having functioned from the 13-th of October 1992 until that point as the ‘Forum for Spiritual Culture’ (or, at the very beginning, the ‘Centre for Spiritual Development’) attached to the Sirius Club for the Study and Preservation of Nature and Human Achievements in the cultural capital of Bulgaria, Plovdiv. Its headquarters are also in Plovdiv.

The association has three central units – in Sofia, Plovdiv, and Varna – and many others throughout the country. Their work is divided into four main strands of activity – the Recording, Study, Presentation and Transmission of the Teaching, ‘The Way of Wisdom’.

In 2000 the center called ‘The House of Wisdom’ opened its doors in Plovdiv, intended as an Academy of Knowledge’ and a prototype of the Temple of the Future – without an altar or rites. Attached to it is the working library ‘Slovo’ (meaning ‘Word’ or ‘Speech’), which gathers literature in almost all branches of knowledge with priority being given to the sections ‘Philosophy’, ‘History’, ‘Cultural Studies’, ‘Esoteric Sciences’, and ‘Religion’. It boasts a wealth of reference works, while what makes it unique is the collection of original material authored by the Teacher, Vaklush Tolev, and the Society created by him: books, periodicals, video, audio, photographic and text materials. The 1-st of November, the Day of the National Enlighteners of Bulgaria, is also commemorated as the Day of the House of Wisdom.

The association regularly makes contributions to public life by organising festivities in connection with national holidays such as The Liberation of Bulgaria from Ottoman rule, the Day of Bulgarian Education and Culture, The Unification of Bulgaria, The Resurrection of Christ (i.e. Easter Sunday) and others. For those wishing to acquaint themselves with and to discuss the ideas of the Teaching of Wisdom, an educational body known as the School of Wisdom is in operation, with an academic year of three terms (from the beginning of October until the end of June) – with weekly projections of lectures and organised discussions.

Every year, usually at the beginning of the month of August, the annual Assembly and Seminar of Wisdom are organised in the Rhodope Mountains, where, apart from meeting in a spirit of community, the Association also holds its official administrative and electoral meetings.

=== Celebratory Days of Wisdom ===
7 January – the Day of the Nativity

The Nativity is the Way to Attaining Godhood!

13 February – The Day of ‘Nur’ magazine

‘Nur’ is the light of Wisdom’s being!

8 April – The Day of the Resurrection

The Resurrection is Dominion beyond the grave!

31 July – The Day of the Co-Deity (sabozhnik in Bulgarian)

History is the Spirit’s Providence.

13 October – The Day of the Children of Day

The Children of Day are a hierarchy of Serving.

1 November – The Day of the House of Wisdom

The House of Wisdom is the Temple of the Future!

21 December – The Day of Messages

Messages are the bread of the Father!

== The Teaching: The Way of Wisdom ==
The Teaching of Vaklush Tolev is defined by some as a syncretism of Eastern Orthodox Christianity, Eastern (Asian) religions, occultism, esotericism and even proto-Bulgarian symbolism. He himself distills the present and future existence of humanity into a new ‘Doctrine of the Hierarchy of Spiritual Waves’, according to which the current Spiritual Wave is that of Wisdom, proclaimed through his Teaching, The Way of Wisdom. The preceding Waves were those of Creation, Mythology, Justice and Love, while the future ones are those of Truth and of Freedom. He does not define the Teaching of Wisdom as a new religion, but as a culture of knowledge. The fundamental concept is not for one to seek God outside of the human being any longer, but within oneself. ‘The battle for the human being has finished,’ says Vaklush Tolev, ‘the battle for the bringing forth of God from the human being begins.’

Despite his training in the Bulgarian Eastern Orthodox Church and his education as a theologian, Vaklush Tolev professes the doctrine of reincarnation, which at the current time is absent from the dogmas of Christianity. He points out, however, that in the Teaching of Christ and in early Christianity reincarnation has an undoubted place. It was not excluded from the dogma until as late as the Fifth Ecumenical Council (Constantinople, 553 AD), while in the Gospels – He who has ears to hear, will discover more than one textual reference to this. (See Matthew 11:12 – 15, Matthew 17:10 – 13).

=== Concerning the Prayer of Love ===
As early as 1956, Vaklush Tolev offered an amendment to the Christian prayer ‘Our Father’ (i.e. ‘The Lord’s Prayer’) (Matthew 6:9 – 13), while in 1957 he sent a letter to Patriarch Cyril on the matter, but received no answer. The Teacher of Wisdom considered that verse 13 of the Gospel of Matthew has been erroneous throughout the ages and that instead of ‘Lead us not into temptation, but deliver us from evil’ it should rightly be ‘Deliver us from evil, so that we do not fall into temptation.’ Later Vaklush found a factual confirmation of his insight in the General Epistle of James – Chapter 1, Verse 13. When he examined the prayer, ‘Our Father’, in different languages he found out that in the Spanish translation it is rendered in the way that he views it.

In 2017 Pope Francis requested a revision of the same text from the prayer and pointed out that the French bishops had introduced corrections after which the phrase sounds like ‘Do not allow us to fall into temptation’. This variation was officially accepted by the Vatican in 2013 and Francis considered it to be more faithful. ‘I am the one who has fallen into temptation, and it is not He who has pushed me towards it,’ comments Pope Francis.

=== The Prayer of Wisdom ===
The Prayer of Wisdom retains the beginning of the prayer ‘Our Father’ since ‘the human being is the Divine Image and the Divine Likeness’. However, it changes the plea – replacing ‘Give us’ there now appears ‘Teach us’. This is ‘a new level of connection to the Divine Energies’.

The text of the whole Prayer of Wisdom reads as follows:

Our Father!

Hallowed be Thy name;

Let Thy kingdom come;

Thy will be done!

Teach us

To be alive within Thee;

Radiant in Spirit and in soul;

Chaste in thought and body;

And with co-divine service

Towards each created being of God

Thou art now and for all times!

Amen!

=== The Altar in the Teaching of Wisdom ===
The Teaching of Wisdom changes the altar before which one prays – the Deity is no longer sought outside of the human being, but within oneself. The new altar in humanity's existence is the Book of Life, maintains the theologian, and this is namely the consciousness of the God within us – the manifestation of the Divine Breath of Life instilled in the human being, the Awakening of Kundalini. This is ‘an altar not of the transcendent God, but of the immanent God,’ concludes the Teacher of Wisdom.

=== Ideas, Central Themes, Maxims ===
In the book ‘Uncovenanted Testament’ the fundamental ideas of the Teaching of Wisdom are summarised. Amongst these are the assertions that in Wisdom one must live...

With a new planetary sociology:

o ’There is no evil, there is unevolved good’ – an inherent positive force for the transformation of negation;

o Gratitude – an impetus towards ascent;

o Responsibility – an awareness of predestination;

o Conscience – the essence and awakened consciousness of a God manifested through a human being;

With a new view of the human being:

o ‘A God-felt necessity’ – only through the human being can God seek Himself and come to know Himself;

o ‘A god in evolution’ – image and likeness;

o ‘A visible theogon’ (theogonic being) – the consciousness of a divine essence;

o ‘Co-deity’ (‘sabozhnik’ in Bulgarian) – a hierarchy which has attained awareness of Unity;

With new principles:

o Life – a self-realising God;

o Energy – an emanation of God, Godhood transformed;

o Material – the last vibration of the Spirit, condensed energy;

With a new practice:

o Altar – the Book of Life, the consciousness of God in the human being, etc.

The doctrine of Wisdom encompasses such topics as ‘God-Dominion, Self-Dominion, No Dominion’, ‘Being, Non-Being, the Restoration of Being’, ‘Godhood as something possessed’, ‘Golgotha – the limit of spiritual passivity’, ‘The battle between thought and revelation’, ‘The Offspring of Adam and the Culture of the Future’, ‘The visible theogonic being – reality and universal essence’, ‘Divine humanity and Human divinity’, ‘God in Man – the struggle for Truth’, ‘Principles of Release from the Earthly and of Ascent’, ‘Self-baptism, Consubstantiality, Co-creatorship’, ‘He who is sufficient unto himself – Being in God’s Likeness and God-dominion’, ‘Self-destiny – freedom from the human’, ‘Intuition, God-inspiration, God-revelation’ and many others.

Some of the most characteristic aphoristic maxims (selected from ‘Nur’ magazine) are:

· ‘It is not the biography which is important, but the aspects of character.’

· ’I have no goal, I have service.’

· ‘There is a reality, more real than reality – that is the reality of the Spirit.’

· ‘Water is the astral image of light.’

· ‘There is no evil, only unevolved good.’

· ‘There is no enemy, there is a co-deity.’

· ‘There is no suffering, there is evolution (self-development).’

· ‘The Labour of Sisyphus is not in the senselessness, but in the absence of despair.’

· ‘It is the human being who is sacred and not the institution!’

· ‘The human being is a god in evolution.’

· ‘The human being is a God-felt necessity’

· ‘It is time for the gods, who became bad human beings, to be replaced by human beings who are good gods.’

· ‘It is the task of Evolution to create not welfare, but gods.’

· ‘Do not seek a memory of the human being – live with the dynamics of the Day – a god in evolution.’

· ‘The Resurrection in the Spiritual Wave of Wisdom is the dominion of the human being beyond the grave.’

· ‘Only inner humility has not offended Fate and the Lord.’

· ‘God is not proven, God is lived.’

· ‘Only God lives, the human being still exists.’

· ‘In the created Adam, the born Christ is at work.’

· ‘The guilt of others is not our innocence.’

· ‘He who knows is more than he who is without sin.’

· ‘Faith is knowledge of the unknown.’

· ‘There is no miracle, there is only unmastered knowledge.’

· ‘There is no miracle, but spiritual realities.’

· ‘The Path is one, but the streets are many.’

· ‘History is made by the will of Caesar and by the prayer of the Priest.’

· ‘Pain which has not become wisdom is suffering; pain which has become wisdom is radiance.’

· ‘Joy is the smile of Wisdom.’

· ‘Wisdom has one face – impregnated with Love and responsible before the Truth.’

· ‘Wisdom is to be, and not to have.’

· ‘In Wisdom there is neither fear, nor miracle, nor dogmas.’

· ‘Dogma falls away when knowledge becomes life.’

· ‘In Wisdom there are no secrets, but there will be mysteries.’

· ‘In Wisdom knowledge is not a method of religious confession, but a formula for attaining Godhood.’

· ‘The Wave of Wisdom is the age of the spiritual maturity of humanity.’

=== Emblematic sign ===
The emblematic sign of the Teaching of Wisdom is the Triangle with the Serpent-Fire-Kundalini, symbolising Wisdom, inscribed within it. The Triangle symbolises the upper part of the Christian Cross, the idea being the victory accomplished by the Cross of the Spirit over material. As a whole, the symbol expresses ‘The Polarity of Time and Unity’ and is a symbol of ‘Knowledge, Creativity, Limitlessness’.

=== Symbols ===
Some of the symbols of the Teaching are: the Number 13 – where 1 is the Creator and 3 is the materialisation of the Creator, while 1 and 3 are the figure of 4 which the Initiated work with – a symbol of the Cross and the spiritualisation of material, i.e. the figure 13 is no longer something ominous, because the human being has to cultivate ‘this resilience, for which saintliness is required, in order to be able to endure the Power and Godhood.’; The Third Eye – as an organ of intuitive knowledge, testifying to insight (and not to proof), so the human being may be formed ‘who generates no doubt as to the idea that he is an evolving god’; The Lily – an expression of ‘purity, of inner openness – when the sun warms you, and of the safe embrace and enclosure of values – when the darkness wants to overwhelm you.’

=== Holy Mysteries ===
The Holy Mysteries of Wisdom are three: Baptism, Communion, and Union in Marriage. Baptism in Wisdom will no longer be with water, but with the fire of Kundalini. Communion is included as a formula for the illumination of the flesh, of material. Union in Marriage is ‘a hospitable home for the coming and the safekeeping of souls.’

‘The Mysteries of Wisdom are the great alchemy for the transformation of a human being into a God,’ says Vaklush Tolev.

=== Hierarchy ===
The New Hierarchy in the Teaching of Wisdom is the Children of Day. ‘The Children of Day are not heralds, but liberators,’ emphasises Vaklush Tolev. ‘They will not wage battles against the gods, but for the gods; not battles for the canonised, but for the sanctified one.’

The 13-th of October – the date on which the Society of Wisdom was registered as a social body, is celebrated as the Day of the Children of Day.

== The Doctrine of the Spiritual Waves ==
According to the Teaching of Wisdom, the Spiritual Waves are degrees of attaining the God, Who is within us. He cannot be attained when He is Within His Own Self, and for this reason we are realised through God, while through us He comes to know Himself, Vaklush maintains. According to him, every Spiritual Wave corresponds to one evolutionary stage of the planetary whole and of the spiritual maturity achieved by humanity in its path towards perfection. They are all an outpouring of the Planetary Logos and as a power of the Divinity itself they are manifested by what are known as the Great Initiated – God-sons, who are prepared hierarchically to receive and to transmit this Emanation of the Logos downwards into the world through theoretical concepts appropriate to the corresponding level.

‘The Spiritual Wave is a leaven and bears with it evolution; it is change, but not with violence. Each one bears a cosmic principle within it,’ concludes Vaklush Tolev. The Spiritual Waves are seven according to the doctrine of the theologian, and in the summary from ‘Nur’ magazine they are arranged as follows

The First Spiritual Wave brings about the Creation – it effects the Involution of the Spirit into material, and the world and the human being are created.

It is the Wave of Self-Awareness, which brings about in the human being the struggle for individualisation on the physical plane.

The Second Spiritual Wave gives birth to Seeking – through polarities the Spirit begins to seek itself in material.

It is the Wave of Mythology, which gives birth to conflict in the soul of the human being and the imagination to search for Godhood.

The Third Spiritual Wave introduces the Rule of Law – Laws are inscribed into the Created Cosmos.

It is the Wave of Justice, which brings with it measurability – the principle of good and evil enters life.

The Fourth Spiritual Wave pulsates with Unity – the world strives towards its Primal Source.

It is the Wave of Love, which pulsates with Unity – the process of evolution begins.

The Fifth Spiritual Wave brings Enlightenment – The Spirit begins to illuminate material.

It is the Wave of Wisdom, which bears knowledge in the form of the baptism of the flesh with the Spirit – the conflict between good and evil is annulled.

The Sixth Spiritual Wave manifests Spiritualisation – unity between the Spirit and material is achieved.

It is the Wave of the Truth, which manifests Godhood in the human being – for him to see immortality as a reality.

The Seventh Spiritual Wave brings about God-Life – the embodied Godhood is set free.

It is of Freedom, which brings about Life – the Freedom of God-Life.

== ‘Nur’ magazine ==
After the political changes from the 10-th of November 1989 onwards, Vaklush Tolev began to deliver regular public lectures in universities and cultural centres throughout the whole of Bulgaria, most of which are documented in the form of audio and video recordings. The subject matter is diverse and wide-ranging – from the extraction of the kernel in world religions and esoteric schools and teachings to the formulation of entirely new concepts and ideas, while special attention is devoted to illuminating subjects from Bulgarian history as well.

From 1993, the lectures began to appear on the book market in the form of a magazine consisting of original authorial material. Vaklush Tolev named it ‘Nur’. In translation from the Arabic the word means ‘an immaterial light that never goes out’, or ‘The heavenly light on Earth.’

The magazine is ‘the autograph of the Teaching, ‘The Way of Wisdom’, in the Third Millennium,’ says the author. It is ‘the baptismal certificate of the human being – an evolving god.’ The cover depicts the open doors to a new altar, which is no longer outside the human being, but is the light of knowledge within him/her. The title above the opened doors is: ‘There is no evil, there is only unevolved good!’

The anniversary of ‘Nur’ magazine's founding is on the 13-th of February.

== Bibliography ==
· Scattered Pearls (collection of poems), 2008

· An index by subject of ‘Nur’ magazine for the period 1993–2013, 2013

Other works also compiled as ‘Nur’ magazine on the basis of the documented lectures and speeches of Vaklush Tolev are:

· The History and Theory of Religions, Volume I, 1992 and 2000

· Esoteric Schools and Mystic Teachings, Volume II, part I, 1995

· Esoteric Schools and Mystic Teachings, Volume II, part II, 2001

· The Assemblies of Wisdom, 1998

· An Almanac of the Messages of the Planetary Logos, 2001

· The Seven Rays of Evolution, 2002 and 2015

· An Album of the 13 Immortal Bulgarians honoured by Name

· Scattered Pearls, a collection of verse, 2008

· The Spiritual Gifts of Bulgaria, Volume I, 2010

· The Spiritual Gifts of Bulgaria, Volume 2, 2012

· Uncovenanted Testament, 2012

The publication of the aphorisms of the Teaching, the fruit of a lifetime's labor, is forthcoming under the title ‘Tablets of Wisdom’.
