= Gennadius =

Gennadius or Gennadios may refer to:

== People ==
- Gennadius of Constantinople (died 471), Patriarch of Constantinople from 458 to 471
- Gennadius of Massilia (5th century) Roman historian, best known for his work De Viris Illustribus
- Gennadius (magister militum Africae), Byzantine general and first exarch of Africa
- Gennadius (7th century), Byzantine general and exarch of Africa
- Gennadius of Astorga (9th century), Bishop of Astorga in Spain
- Gennadius Scholarius (c.1400–c.1473), Patriarch of Constantinople from 1454 to 1464
- Georgios Gennadios (1784–1854), Greek man of letters and educationalist
- Joannes Gennadius (1844–1932), Greek diplomat and bibliophile, son of Georgios
- Gennadios (Zervos) (born 1937), Greek Orthodox bishop in Italy
- Gennadios Xenodochof (born 1988), Greek footballer

== Other ==
- Gennadius Library, Athens, Greece, founded by Joannes and named for Giorgios
- Gennadius (moth), a genus of moth

== See also ==
- Gennady
