= January (play) =

January (Bulgarian: Януари is an allegorical play by Yordan Radichkov written in 1974.

January is distinguished by its wealth of characters and intertwined elements of the folklore of Northwestern Bulgaria with biblical allusions. It highlights the major conflict clash between the past and modernity in an aging village and those in it when innovation enters and opposition ensues over communication versus isolation.

January was translated into English by Judith Sprostranov and is included in the collection Contemporary Bulgarian Plays, issued by Tantalus Books in 2002.
