= Giovanni De Gennaro =

Giovanni De Gennaro may refer to:

- Giovanni de Gennaro (bishop) (died 1556), Roman Catholic prelate
- Giovanni De Gennaro (police officer) (1948–2026), chairman of the first Italian Defense Group Leonardo (formerly Finmeccanica)
- Giovanni De Gennaro (canoeist) (born 1992), Italian slalom canoeist
