= Felix and Januarius =

Christian martyrs

Saints Felix and Januarius
- Born: 72 AD; Palermo, Italy
- Residence: Heraclea
- Died: 95 AD; Heraclea
- Honored in: Catholic Church
- Feast: January 7

Felix and Januarius were two Christian martyrs and twin brothers. Their acts and the year of their martyrdom has not survived, but it is placed in Heraclea. Their feast day was observed jointly on January 7.

== See also ==
- Other saints Felix
- Other saints Januarius
