= January (disambiguation) =

January is the first month of the year.

January may also refer to:

== Literature ==
- January (novel), the first book in the Countdown series by Daniel Parker
- January (play), a 1974 play by Yordan Radichkov
- January Magazine, a book-review website

== Music ==
- January (Marcin Wasilewski album) or the title composition, 2007
- January (Page McConnell and Trey Anastasio album), 2023
- "January" (song), a song by Pilot, 1975
- "January", a song by Elton John from The Big Picture, 1997

== People ==
- January (surname), the surname of several people
- January (given name), the given name of several people

== See also ==
- Captain January (disambiguation), the name of a book and two films
- January Club, a discussion group founded in 1934 by Oswald Mosley
- Janvier (disambiguation), French for January
