= January Thompson =

- Born: January Thompson; January 28, 1988 (age 38); Los Angeles, California
- Genres: Downtempo electronica, ambient
- Occupation: Singer-songwriter
- Instruments: Vocals, piano, keyboards, synthesizer
- Years active: 2009–present
- Label: January Music
- Website: Official website

January Thompson (born January 28, 1988) is an electronic artist, singer, composer, producer and performer.

== Discography ==
=== Studio albums ===
List of studio albums, with selected chart positions, sales figures and certifications
Title	Album details	Peak chart positions		
Title	Album details	IRL	UK	US
Kintsugi	Released: August 2, 2019; Label: January Music; Formats: CD, digital download	—	—	—
Whelmed Live at the Spire	Released: January 22, 2019; Label: January Music; Formats: CD, digital download	—	—	—
Whelmed	Released: April 29, 2017; Label: January Music; Formats: Vinyl, CD, digital download	—	—	—
Careful What You Tell The Sky	Released: January 26, 2010; Label: Quango Records (Island); Formats: Vinyl, CD, digital download	—	—	—
January Tuesday	Released: February 7, 2012; Label: Miso Records; Formats: Vinyl, CD, digital download	—	—	—

=== Singles ===
List of released singles, with selected chart positions, sales figures and certifications
Title	Album details	Peak chart positions		
Title	Album details	IRL	UK	US
My Alchemy (Single)	Album: Kintsugi; Released: September 5, 2019; Label: January Music; Formats: CD, digital download	—	—	—
Light Caught (Single)	Album: Kintsugi; Released: July 1, 2019; Label: January Music; Formats: CD, digital download	—	—	—
You For Me (Single)	Album: Whelmed; Released: February 13, 2018; Label: January Music; Formats: Vinyl, CD, digital download	—	—	—
Self titled EP January	Released: August 1, 2017; Label: Quango Records (Island); Formats: Vinyl, CD, digital download	—	—	—
Whelmed (Single)	Album: Whelmed; Released: January 26, 2017; Label: January Music; Formats: Vinyl, CD, digital download	—	—	—
Too Soon (Single)	Album: Whelmed; Released: January 13, 2017; Label: January Music; Formats: Vinyl, CD, digital download	—	—	—
Find My Way	Album: January Tuesday; Released: January 31, 2013; Label: Miso Records; Formats: Vinyl, CD, digital download	—	—	—
Wonderland	Album: We Are But Chunks Of Wood (with Little People); Released: October 9, 2012; Label: Youth And Progress Records; Formats: Vinyl, CD, digital download	—	—	—
Passing By	Album: Looking Through Leaves (with Carmen Rizzo); Released: May 11, 2010; Label: Electrophone Music; Formats: Vinyl, CD, digital download	—	—	—
