= Deeds of the Neapolitan Bishops =

The Deeds of the Neapolitan Bishops is a Latin history of the diocese of Naples from its beginnings down to 876. It is found in a single manuscript, now Vaticanus Latinus 5007, and consists of three parts written by three different authors. It covers the reigns of the first 46 bishops of Naples. The manuscript is of the 9th or 10th century.

The title is conventional. There is no title and no introduction or prologue in the manuscript. Deeds of the Neapolitan Bishops is the title of the modern English translation by Luigi Andrea Berto, from the Latin title Gesta episcoporum Neapolitanorum, coined by Georg Waitz for the Monumenta Germaniae Historica. The title Chronicon episcoporum Neapolitanae ecclesiae was coined by Bartolommeo Capasso. The work belongs to the gesta episcoporum genre.

The first part is anonymous. Beginning with the birth of Jesus, it covers the first 39 bishops down to the death of Calvus in 762. It was probably written not long after, certainly by the 840s. Its entries are short and do not amount to episcopal biographies, rarely going beyond a bishop's length of tenure, construction projects and burial place. This information is supplemented by historical context but rarely material specific to Naples. A majority of the material in the first part is borrowed from other sources, such as Bede's On the Six Ages of the World, the Liber pontificalis and Paul the Deacon's History of the Lombards. Mostly the author is faithful to his sources but his editorial stance is shown by an instance in which he credits Charles Martel exclusively for a victory over the Saracens that Paul the Deacon also attributes to Liutprand, King of the Lombards.

There is a leaf missing in the manuscript in the entry for Calvus. The missing text concerns the reign of the Emperor Constantine V and how he escaped alive from inside a dragon. The Deeds is the only source to record the episode of Constantine slaying a dragon that had occupied the Aqueduct of Valens.

The second part is a continuation from the reign of Calvus's successor, Paul II, down to the death of Athanasius I in 872. Its author wrote in the first person and describes himself as young. A note in the manuscript identifies him as John the Deacon. He is usually identified with the hagiographer John the Deacon, who was active around the same time. His is a more detailed history than the first part, probably drawing on both oral and written sources and making use of direct speech and dialogue. He provides information not just on Naples's bishops but on its dukes as well. He was opposed to Byzantine iconoclasm and tried to absolve the Neapolitan church from any role in it.

The final part is a biography of Athanasius II written by Peter the Subdeacon, who was active in the 10th century. The end of the manuscript is missing. It ends in 876 and it is unclear how far beyond this point Peter went. He may have been writing as late as the 950s.

The importance of the Deeds is that it "is a rare, if not unique, historical text composed before the fourteenth century, in and about Naples."

== Bibliography ==
- Berto, Luigi Andrea, ed. (2023). The Deeds of the Neapolitan Bishops: A Critical Edition and Translation of the Gesta Episcoporum Neapolitanorum. Routledge.
- Deliyannis, Deborah (2016). "Chronicon episcoporum Neapolitanae ecclesiae". In G. Dunphy (ed.). Encyclopedia of the Medieval Chronicle Online. Brill.
- Gero, Stephen (1978). "The Legend of Constantine V as Dragon-Slayer". Greek, Roman, and Byzantine Studies. 19 (2): 155–159.
- Heath, Christopher (2023). "Review of Berto 2023". Al-Masāq. 35 (3): 409–411. doi:10.1080/09503110.2023.2261295.
