= Miguel Ángel Martín =

Miguel Ángel Martín may refer to:

- Miguel Ángel Martín (basketball), for Real Madrid Baloncesto
- Miguel Ángel Martín (comics), Spanish comic author and artist
- Miguel Ángel Martín (golfer), Spanish golfer
- Miguel Ángel Martín Perdiguero, Spanish road cyclist
