= Gennadius junctor =

Scientific classification
- Kingdom: Animalia
- Phylum: Arthropoda
- Clade: Pancrustacea
- Class: Insecta
- Order: Lepidoptera
- Family: Pyralidae
- Subfamily: Phycitinae
- Genus: Gennadius; Heinrich, 1956
- Species: G. junctor

Binomial name
- Gennadius junctor Heinrich, 1956

Species of moth

Gennadius is a genus of snout moths. It was described by Carl Heinrich in 1956, and contains a single species, Gennadius junctor. It is found in French Guiana.
