= The Grand Gennaro =

The Grand Gennaro is an Italian-American novel written by Garibaldi M. Lapolla. It tells the story of an Italian immigrant to the United States in East Harlem.

The book was published in 1935. It has been described as one of the well-hidden pieces of Italian-American literature, having "elements of greatness."

== Plot ==
The story circulates around the main character, Gennaro Accuci, and how he leaves his family behind in Italy in order to make riches in America. He takes over the business of an old friend by force, and soon rises to power and becomes an influential member of early Italian-American society in New York. After seven years of cheating on his wife, he finally calls for his family to come over to the new country. His oldest, rebellious son, is caught trying to rape a neighbor, and subsequently is forced to marry her by Gennaro, who often beats his son for being lazy. They children soon have an annulment, and the neighbor goes to a Protestant asylum where she is Americanized. She returns to her family, her parents move to the country, the oldest son (Domenico) is killed in the Spanish–American War, and Gennaro's wife dies of sadness. Gennaro then marries Carmela who is now much older, although his youngest son also has feelings for her. However, in the recession of 1907, an old enemy of Gennaro's shows up and kills him (Gennaro stole his business from him when first coming to the country in the 1880s).
