= Captain January =

Captain January may refer to:

- Captain January (novel), a children's novel written by Laura E. Richards in 1891
- Captain January (1924 film), silent film featuring child actress Baby Peggy
- Captain January (1936 film), musical featuring child actress Shirley Temple
