= Genaro Lezcano =

Argentine basketball player

Medals
Men's basketball
Representing Argentina
Pan American Games
Silver medal – second place	1955 Mexico City	Team

Genaro Lezcano (born c.1935) is an Argentine former basketball player.
