= Ignazio Perrici =

Italian painter, sculptor, and decorator

Ignazio Perrici or Perricci (December 1834 – 4 May 1907) was an Italian painter, sculptor, and decorator.

== Biography ==
He was born in Monopoli near Bari, he was orphaned of father and impoverished. He was sent to study painting at the Academy of Fine Arts of Naples. In 1854, he was hired to help decorate the Villa Reale La Favorita under the direction of Gagliani. In 1857, he helped restore the Vicaria of Naples. In 1858, he collaborated with his friend Molinari, in decorating with a neo-Byzantine style a section of the Duomo of Troia. In 1862, he painted the decoration for the theater of Trani. He exhibited an oil canvas depicting Savonarola, bought by the City Hall of Naples. In 1865, he was called by Fiorelli and Ruggiero to paint some rooms of the Museo Nazionale, and in 1869, he was made a professor of decoration at the Neapolitan Institute of Fine Arts. he collaborated with Domenico Morelli and Enrico Alvino in work for the Prince of Naples. He was awarded the Cross of Knight of the Order of the Crown of Italy. In 1870, he was working in halls of the Provincial council of Naples. He also completed a design of a monument to the Cairoli Brothers, now in the cemetery of Naples.

In 1871 he painted in the cupola of the main altar of the Naples Cathedral. In 1872, he designed the ballroom for the Baron Compagni in Corigliano d'Otranto. In 1874–75, he was at work in the decoration of a palace at Bovino, when he was recruited by Cavaliere Petagna, an engineer to help decorate the ball-room of the Palazzo Quirinale. The paintings in the adjacent room were by Cesare Maccari; the hall of mirrors was also decorated by Pasquale De Criscito (Di Criscito).

In 1877, halting his work for the halls of the Quirinale, he returned to Naples, and won an award at the National Exhibition for a project of decoration for the sala d' Ercole at the Palazzo Reale di Napoli. He was soon nominated Knight of the Order of Santi Maurizio e Lazzaro. In 1879, he decorated the main hall of the Società Storica Napoletana, and submitted a praised model for the Monument to Vittorio Emanuele in Turin. he died in Naples.
