= Gennaro Basile =

Italian painter

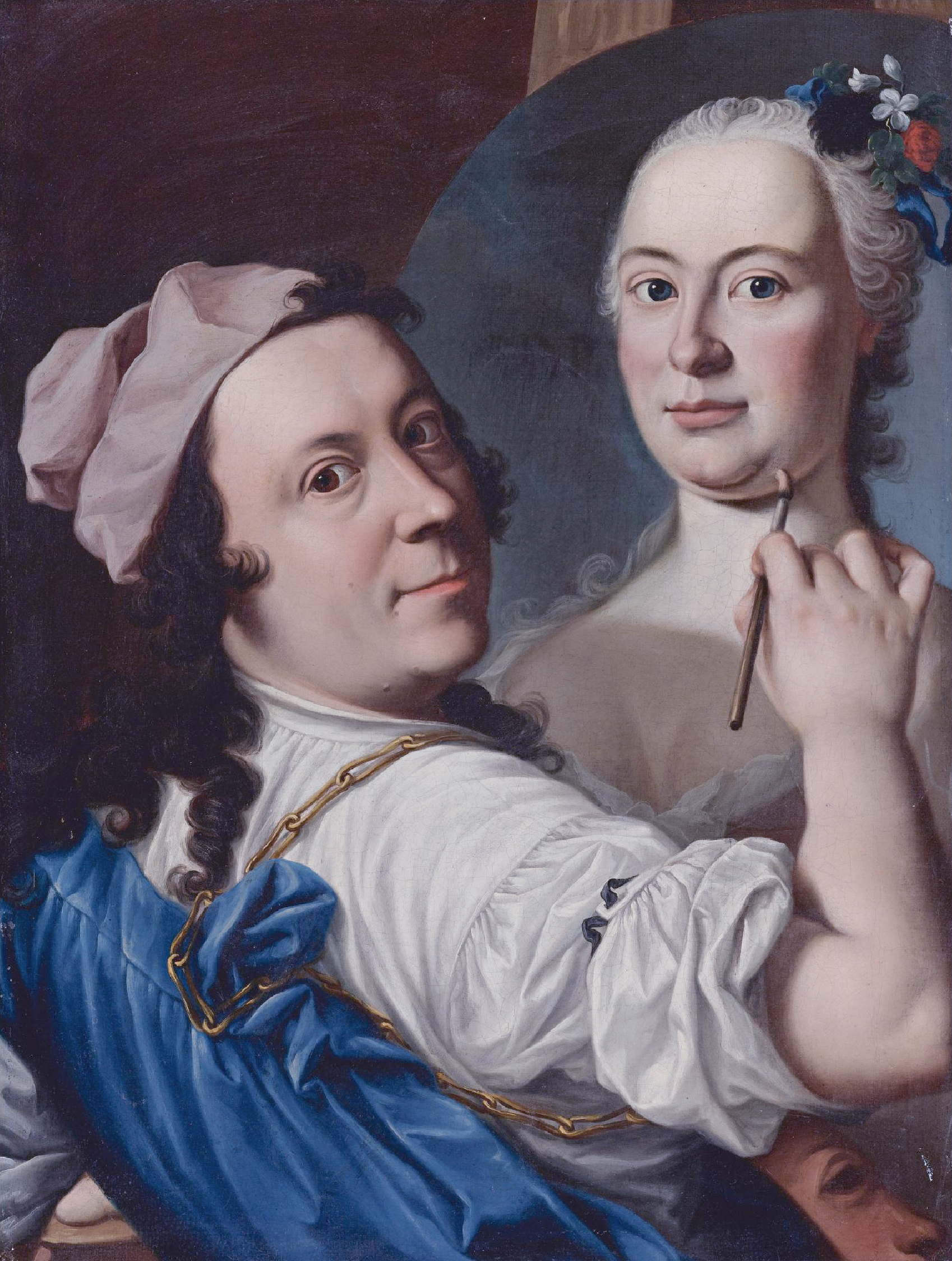
Painting of Gennaro Basile by Gennaro Basile

Gennaro Basile was an Italian painter, born in Naples but active in the German-speaking countries. He settled at Brünn, in Moravia, and lived about 1756. His best picture is the altar-piece in the chapel of the chateau at Seeberg, in Salzburg. Most of his works remained in Moravia.
