= Gennaro Santillo =

Italian footballer

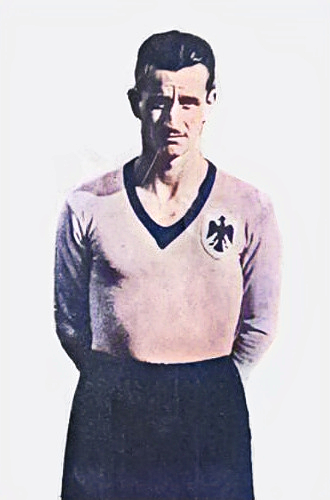
- Santillo with Palermo in 1937

Personal information
- Date of birth: 1 January 1908
- Place of birth: La Spezia, Italy
- Date of death: 13 April 1943 (aged 35)
- Place of death: Castelvetrano, Italy
- Position: Midfielder

Senior career*
Years	Team	Apps	(Gls)
1925–1932	Spezia	135	(6)
1932–1940	Palermo	214	(5)
1940–1942	Grosseto	34	(0)
- * Club domestic league appearances and goals

Gennaro Santillo (1 January 1908 – 13 April 1943) was an Italian professional football player. He played for Spezia, Palermo and Grosseto.

A defensive midfielder, Santillo was captain of Palermo during the 1930s and was summoned by Italy national football team coach Vittorio Pozzo on several occasions. He died at Castelvetrano (Sicily) during the Second World War.
