= John the Deacon (Neapolitan historian) =

John the Deacon (died after 910) was a religious writer who held a diaconate in the church of Saint Januarius Outside the Walls at Naples. From his writings, he appears to have been very learned. He wrote several historical works, important sources of information for the history of his time.

He first wrote a continuation of the diocesan chronicle of Naples (Gesta episcoporum Neapolitanorum), begun by another cleric, but which he brings down from 762 to 872. He makes use of both written and oral tradition, and contributes from personal knowledge. The narrative is graphic and spirited, and impresses the reader as a frank and accurate story. He also wrote a history of the translation in the fifth century of the remains of St. Severinus, the Apostle of Noricum, from the Castellum Lucullanum in the Bay of Naples to a new monastery within the city. This work contains the important account of the destruction of Taormina in Sicily by the Saracens under Ibrahim, and of the martyrdom of Bishop Procopius. When in 910 the relics of St. Sossius, a companion of St. Januarius, were transferred from the ruined Miseno to the same monastery at Naples, John wrote a history of St. Januarius and his companions, in which as an eyewitness he describes the aforesaid transfer. He also translated a biography of Nicholas of Myra from the Greek Methodius ad Theodorum.
