= Genaro (surname) =

Genaro (from the Latin Januarius, meaning "devoted to Janus") is the surname of the following notable people:

- Donald Genaro (born 1932), American industrial designer
- Frankie Genaro (1901–1966), American boxer
- Joseph Genaro (born 1962), American musician and songwriter
- Juma Genaro (born 1982), South Sudanese football goalkeeper
- Mary DeGenaro (born 1961), American jurist
- Si Genaro (born 1971), British musician
- Tony Genaro (1942–2014), American film, television and stage actor

== See also ==
- Gennaro (disambiguation)
