= Miguel Martín López =

Mexican politician

- Born: 18 December 1967 (age 58); Tuxpan, Veracruz, Mexico
- Occupation: Politician
- Political party: PAN

Miguel Martín López (born 18 December 1967) is a Mexican politician from the National Action Party (PAN). In the 2009 mid-terms he was elected to the Chamber of Deputies to represent the third district of Veracruz during the 61st Congress.
