= DiGennaro Communications =

Public relations and communications company based in New York city

- Industry: Public relations
- Founded: 2006
- Founder: Samantha DiGennaro
- Headquarters: New York City
- Key people: Samantha DiGennaro (Founder, CEO); MaryLiz Ghanem (SVP); Kristen Morquecho (SVP); Tony Cofone (CFO)
- Revenue: $5 million (2013)
- Number of employees: 35 (2014)
- Website: www.digennaro-usa.com

DiGennaro Communications, also known as DGC, is an independent B2B and B2C public relations and communications company based in New York City. Founded in 2006 by Samantha DiGennaro, the agency works primarily with companies in the marketing, media, technology, and entertainment industries.

== History ==
DiGennaro Communications, an independent B2B and B2C public relations and communications company, was founded in 2006 by chief executive officer Samantha DiGennaro. The company established headquarters in New York City. DiGennaro Communications works with clients including Facebook, Ringling Bros. and Barnum & Bailey Circus, McDonald's, Ogilvy & Mather, Live Nation Entertainment, and BMW to get their stories covered in outlets such as The New York Times and place their executives on the global speaker circuit.

In January 2012, DiGennaro Communications entered into a partnership with Eulogy, a London-based public relations firm, as part of an expansion of its international operations. In 2013, the company formed a strategic partnership with Sydney-based public relations firm Access PR.

In 2013, DiGennaro Communications reported an annual revenue of $5 million. During this period, the company was also included multiple times on Inc. Magazine's Inc. 5000 list of fastest growing private companies in the United States.

In 2020, DiGennaro Communications appointed Maxine Winer as President and Chief Operating Officer.

In 2026, DiGennaro Communications expanded its executive leadership team, appointing MaryLiz Ghanem and Kristen Morquecho as co-managing directors and Laura Petrecca as chief content officer.
