= Gennaro Olivieri (footballer) =

Italian footballer and manager (1942–2020)

Personal information
- Date of birth: 10 February 1942
- Place of birth: Castellammare di Stabia, Italy
- Date of death: 26 January 2020 (aged 77)
- Place of death: Castellammare di Stebia
- Height: 1.70 m (5 ft 7 in)
- Position: Defender

Senior career*
Years	Team	Apps	(Gls)
1960–1961	Juve Stabia	34	(?)
1961–1966	SPAL	102	(3)
1966–1967	Roma	17	(0)
1967–1969	Perugia	62	(0)
1969–1971	Salernitana	61	(?)
1971–1972	Nocerina	32	(0)
1972–1973	Juve Stabia	32	(0)
1973–1975	Puteolana		

Managerial career
- 1978–1979: Scafatese
- 1979–1980: Irpinia
- 1980–1981: Cavese
- 1982–1983: Reggina
- 1983–1984: Siderno
- 1984–1985: Cassano Jonio
- 1985: Paganese
- * Club domestic league appearances and goals

Gennaro Olivieri (10 February 1942 – 27 January 2020) was an Italian professional football player and coach. He played as a defender for five seasons (93 games, one goal) in the Italian Serie A for SPAL 1907 and A.S. Roma.
