= Roman Catholic Diocese of Naples =

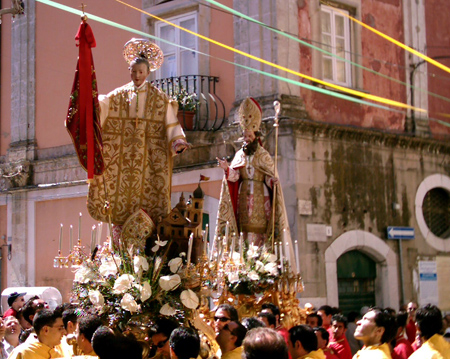
Statues of Saint Severinus and Saint Severus (right), a former Bishop of Naples, carried during a procession at San Severo

The Diocese of Naples was a Roman Catholic diocese in southern Italy, the see being in Naples. A Christian community was founded there in the 1st century AD and the diocese was raised to the level of a Metropolitan Archdiocese in the 10th century, becoming the Roman Catholic Archdiocese of Naples.

The Deeds of the Neapolitan Bishops is a history of the diocese down to 876.

== See also ==
- Catholic Church in Italy
- List of bishops and archbishops of Naples
