= Genaro Ruiz Arriaga =

Mexican politician

- Born: 1 July 1955 (age 70); Federal District, Mexico
- Occupation: Deputy
- Political party: PRI

Genaro Ruiz Arriaga (born 1 July 1955) is a Mexican politician affiliated with the Institutional Revolutionary Party (PRI). In the 2012 general election he was elected to the Chamber of Deputies to represent the third district of Veracruz during the 62nd Congress.
