= Gennady Ustyugov =

Russian painter (1937–2025)

- Геннадий Устюгoв
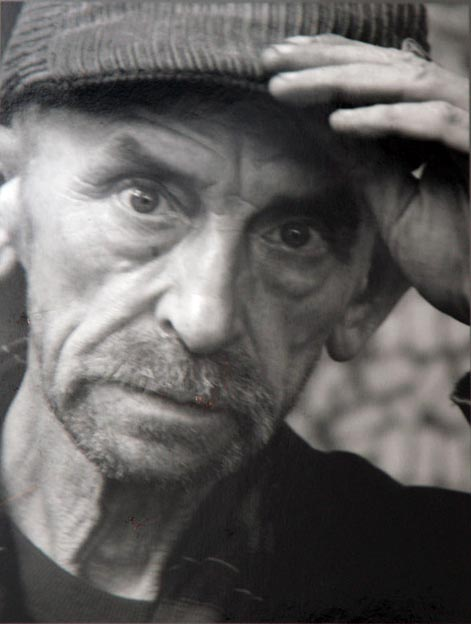
- Ustyugov in 2005
- Born: 18 March 1937; Tokmok, Frunze Oblast, Kirghiz SSR, USSR
- Died: 12 December 2025 (aged 88); Saint Petersburg, Russia
- Occupations: Poet, artist

Gennady Afanasievich Ustyugov (Russian: Геннадий Афанасьевич Устюгoв; 18 March 1937 – 12 December 2025) was a Russian artist and poet. He was a representative of the unofficial art of Leningrad in the 1970–1980s.

== Life and career ==
Ustyugov was born in Tokmok, Frunze Oblast, Kirghiz SSR on 18 March 1937. His father was a carpenter originally from Vyatka, and his mother was a seamstress from Samara.

From the late 1960s, Ustyugov was actively engaged in painting. In 1974 he participated in the Gazanevsky art exhibitions and was a member of the Association of Experimental Exhibitions and the Association of Experimental Fine Arts. At this time, he was friends with Oleg Grigoriev and Mikhail Shemyakin. In 1990, the first solo exhibition of Gennady Ustyugov was held at the Museum of Urban Sculpture in St. Petersburg.

Ustyugov's works are kept in the Hermitage Museum, Russian Museum, A.S. Popov Central Museum of Communications, and the museums of Murmansk, Novosibirsk, Yaroslavl, and Nabokov House, among others.

Ustyugov was diagnosed with schizophrenia.

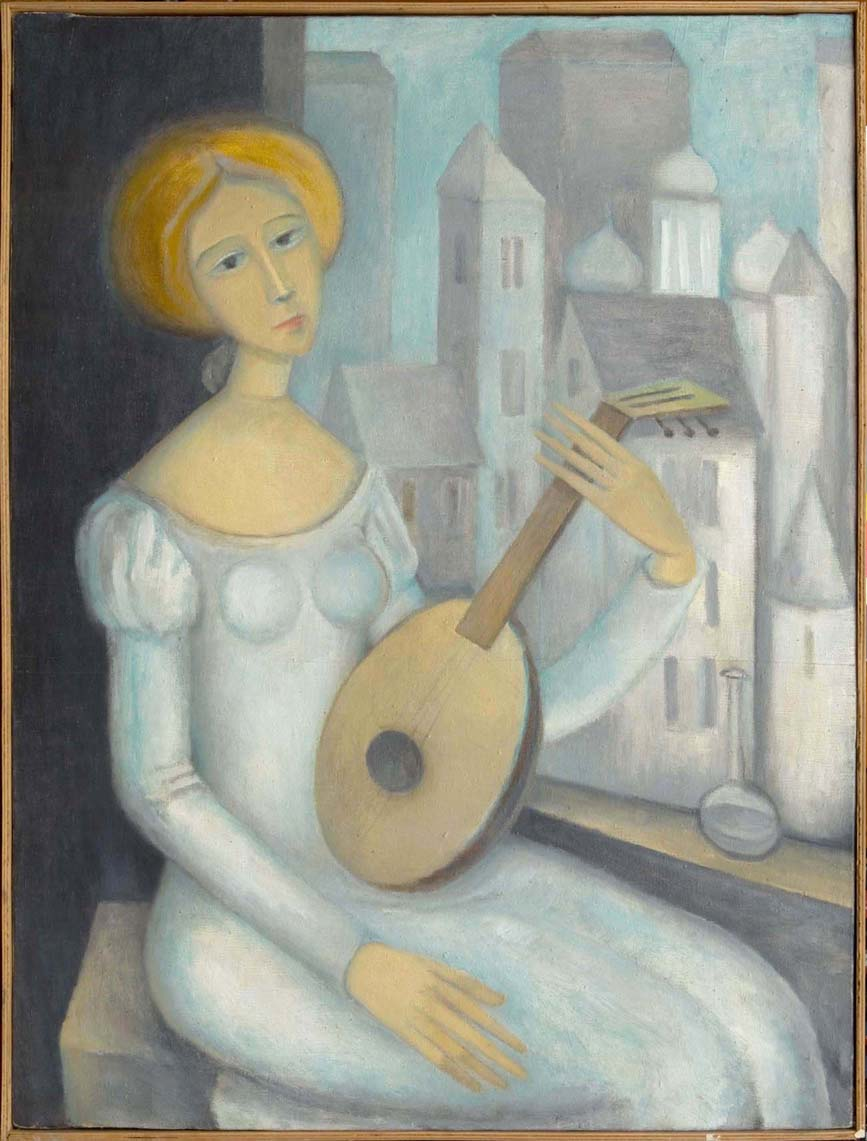
'Girl with a lute', 1975

Ustyugov was not married and had no children. He died on 12 December 2025, at the age of 89.
