= Januarius (disambiguation) =

Januarius (Latin for "devoted to Janus"; Italian: Gennaro) usually refers to St Januarius, bishop of Benevento or Naples.

Januarius may also refer to:

== Months ==
- Januarius, the first month of the ancient Roman calendar
- January, the first month of the modern calendar

== People ==
- Januarius, the nomen or Roman last name of the gens Januaria
- Januarius, bishop of Flumenpiscense in Mauretania
- Januarius of Heraclea, martyred with Felix (Jan. 7)
- St Januarius of Cordova, martyred with Faustus and Martialis (Oct. 13)
- St Januarius of Rome:
  - St Januarius (d. 10 July 165), son of St Felicity and one of the 7 Holy Brothers, martyr
  - St Januarius the Deacon (d. 6 August 258), martyred with Pope Sixtus II and his five other deacons
- Januarius (c. 250), bishop of Lambaese in Roman Numidia
- Januarius (c. 250), bishop of Muzuca
- St Januarius (d. 29 October 298), son of Marcellus, martyred in Spain with his family
- St Januarius of Zaragoza, sometimes listed among the 18 Martyrs of Zaragoza (d. 16 April 303)
- Januarius (d. 24 October 303), martyred with SS Felix, Audactus, Fortunatus, & Septimus
- St Januarius of Torres (d. 304), martyred with SS Gavinus and Protus on Sardinia
- St Januarius of Nicopolis in Armenia (d. c. AD 320), martyred with St Pelagia
- Januarius (c. 325), bishop of Jericho present at Nicaea
- Januarius or Januarius II (c. 343), bishop of Benevento
- Januarius I (c. 394), bishop of Aquae in Mauretania
- Januarius (c. 411), bishop of Tunusuda
- Januarius (c. 411), bishop of Lamasna
- Januarius (c. 411), bishop of Cunculiana
- Januarius (c. 411), bishop of Aptuca
- Januarius (c. 411), bishop of Centuriona in Numidia
- Januarius (c. 411), bishop of Nara in Byzacene
- Januarius (c. 411), bishop of Libertina
- Januarius (r. 444–447), bishop of Aquileia
- Januarius (c. 448), bishop of Marciana in Lycia
- Januarius (c. 450), bishop of Leontopolis in Lower Egypt
- Januarius (c. 465), bishop of Praeneste
- Januarius (r. c. 462 – c. 484), bishop of Rimini
- Januarius II (c. 484), bishop of Aquae in Mauritania
- Januarius (c. 484), bishop of Centuriae in Numidia
- Januarius (c. 484), bishop of Gauria
- Januarius (c. 484), bishop of Jactera in Numidia
- Januarius (c. 484), bishop of Nasbinca
- Januarius (c. 484), bishop of Tagaste
- Januarius (c. 484), bishop of Valesa
- Januarius (4th century), founding bishop of Viviers in France
- Januarius (r. 505–515), bishop of Salona in Dalmatia
- Januarius (c. 525), bishop of Vegeselae
- Januarius (c. 525), bishop of Mascula
- Januarius, bishop of Cagliari on Sardinia & correspondent with Gregory the Great
- Januarius (c. 600), bishop of Malaga
- Januarius (c. 640), bishop of Gattia in Byzacene
- Januarius (c. 640), bishop of Bana in Byzacene
- Januarius (c. 646), bishop of Libertini in Africa
- Januarius (c. 646), bishop of Musti in Africa
- Prince Januarius, Count of Caltagirone
- Januarius Gagliano
- Januarius Kyunosuke Hayasaka
- Januarius MacGahan
- Januarius Maria Sarnelli
- Januarius Zick

== See also ==
- January, the anglicized form of Januarius
- Gennaro, the italicized form of Januarius
- Janus
- September 19, the Feast of St Januarius
- Catacombs of St Januarius in Naples
- Order of St Januarius, bestowed by the titular King of Naples, a member of the Spanish royal family
