= Archaeological sites in Naples =

Naples (Italy) and its immediate surroundings preserve an archaeological heritage of inestimable value and among the best in the world. For example, the archaeological park of the Phlegraean Fields (Cumae, Baiae, the Flavian Amphitheatre and the Pozzuoli forum) is directly connected to the centre of Naples through the Cumana railway, and the nearby sites of Pompeii, Herculaneum, Stabiae and Oplontis are among the World Heritage Sites of UNESCO.

Despite the ancient city being largely buried by the extensive modern city, remains are preserved in many places. Parthènope, the first settlement founded by the Cumaeans of Naples on the Pizzofalcone hill in the 8th century BC, has left only a few traces, such as the 7th century BC necropolis and the stretch of a wall in the Town Hall square, probably belonging to the port.

Much more visible is the 6th c. BC Greek and later Roman city of Neapolis, partly due to the relatively recent underground extension, which includes many archaeological sites and finds preserved in various city archaeological museums.

== Urban layout ==
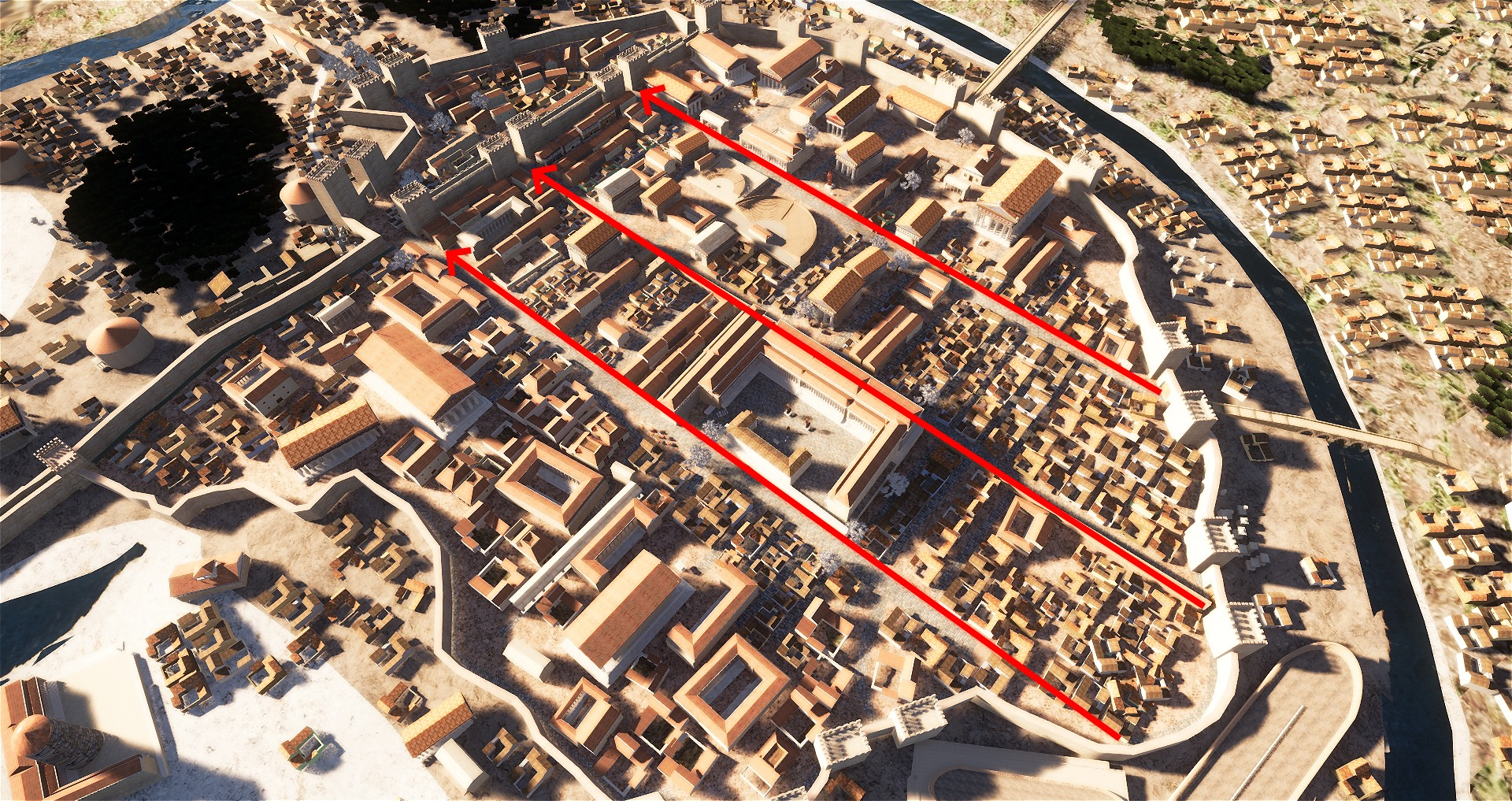
Model of Greek Neapolis, stenopoi in red

Much of the rectangular street grid of the 6th century BC is still followed by modern streets.

The Greek system of three main roads parallel to each other, called plateiai (decumani in the Roman era), cross the urban centre dividing it into four parts. These streets were cut perpendicularly from north to south by smaller streets called stenopoi of which there were up to 24.

The 3 decumani are, from west to east:

- Superior: consisting of Via Sapienza, Via Pisanelli, and Via Anticaglia
- Maximus: Via dei Tribunali
- Inferior: Via Spaccanapoli, consisting of Via Benedetto Croce and Via San Biagio dei Librai.

The agora was located at the centre of the Decumanus Maximus. The agora underlying the Piazza San Gaetano was divided in two by the main street where on the north side, near the temple of the Dioscuri (today Basilica of San Paolo Maggiore), religious functions took place while on the south side was the market, the aerarium and other public buildings. The excavations of San Lorenzo Maggiore which can be visited show the remains of the agora.

In the Roman period the lower decumanus was lengthened towards the southwest from Piazza del Gesù Nuovo up to via Domenico Capitelli.

== Roman theatre ==
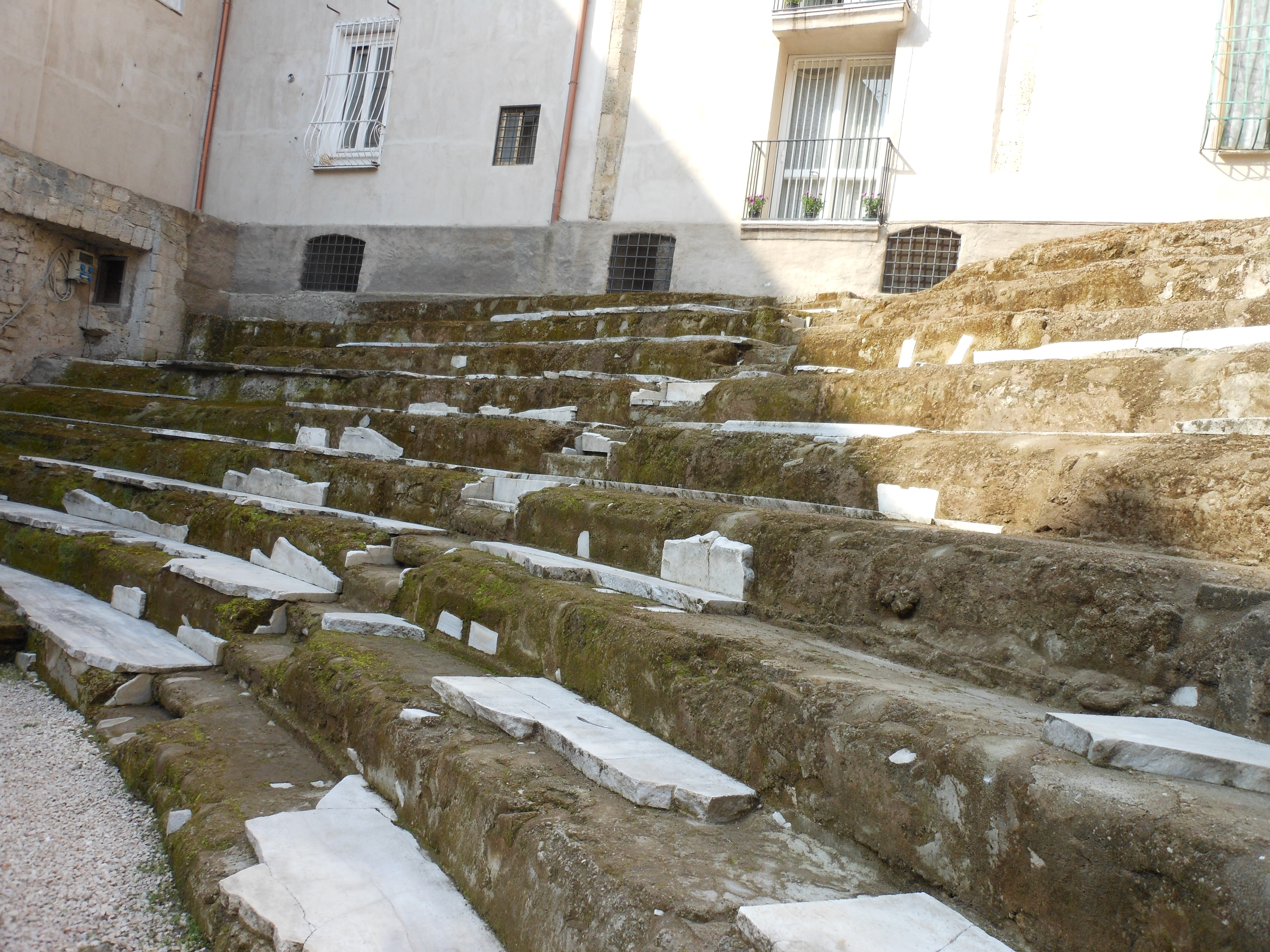
Theatre cavea with marble cladding

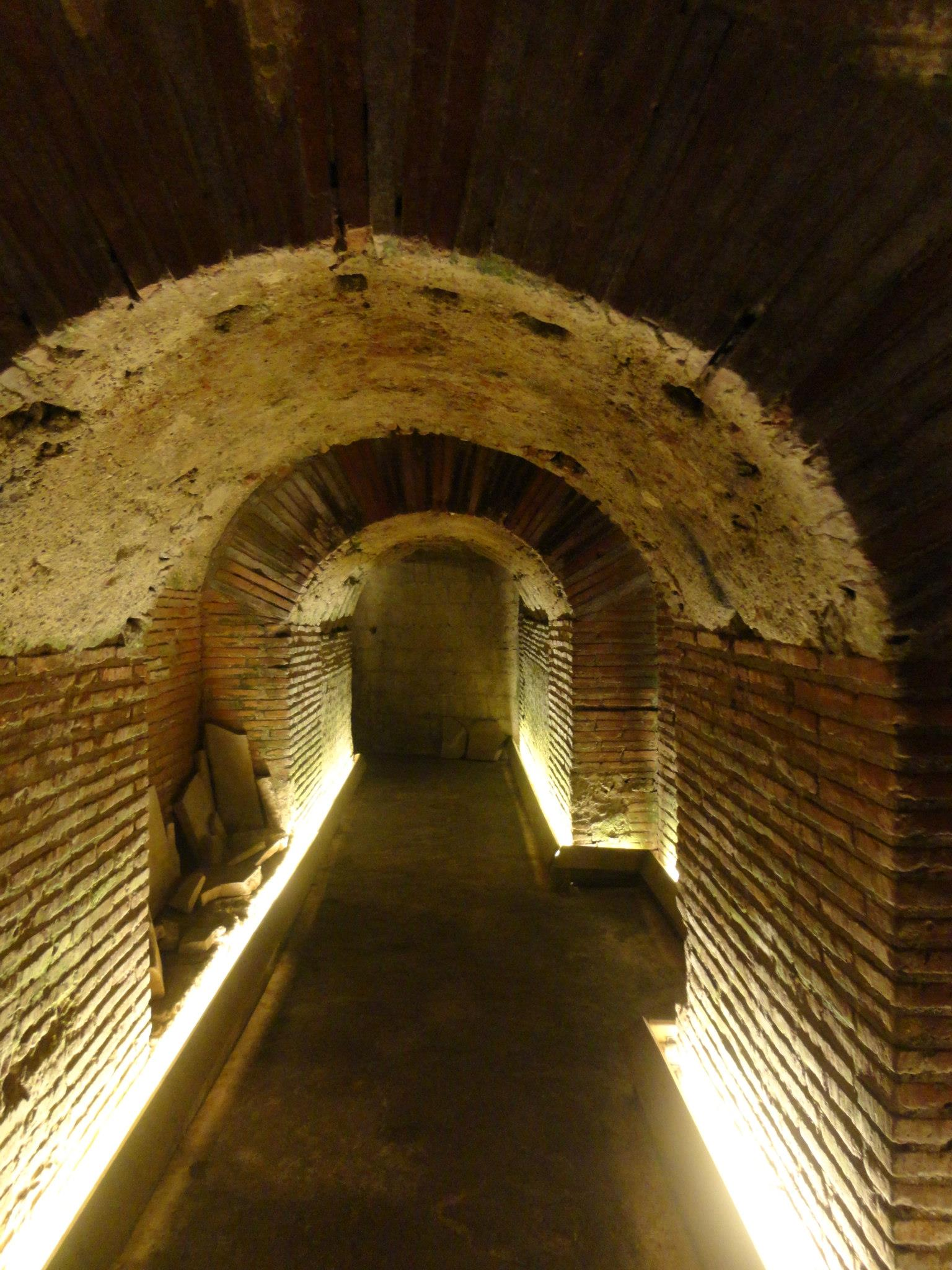
Vaulted tunnels beneath the cavea

The theatre was one of the glories of Neapolis according to Augustus, the guardian of Hellenic culture.

=== History ===
Claudius had plays performed here in honour of his beloved brother Germanicus. In 64 AD Nero performed here. Naples prided itself on its Greek origins and Greek culture. Nero took his appearances on stage seriously, practicing, engaging in the strenuous voice-exercises, learning his performance. He had just started to sing when a violent earthquake occurred that he interpreted as the gods' appreciation so continued to sing and forced the audience to stay. The theatre collapsed afterwards.

The theatre was renovated during the late 1st century and in the 2nd century. Statius in the Flavian age exalts in the temples and a large arcaded square (perhaps the Forum) and refers to two large theatres in the city, the open and the covered one, located in the upper part of the Forum, behind the sacred area of the temple of the Dioscuri.

The fall of the Roman Empire also marked the fall of theatrical performances in general and the structure was abandoned, also after a flood between the 5th and 6th centuries.

The mediaeval period saw the oblivion of the structure, used first as a small necropolis (datable to the 7th century) or landfill and finally, between the 15th and 17th centuries it was overwhelmed by the construction of buildings on the cavea.

The interiors were used as stables, cellars, warehouses and shops until recently. First discoveries took place in 1859 for the excavation of a sewer. The first archaeological excavation was at the end of the 19th century in the garden of the building at the centre of the theatre. The first recovery plan dates to 1939 but only from 1997 was the theatre partially unveiled, and from 2003 the cavea was revealed in the internal garden.

=== Remains ===
The theatre lies between via Anticaglia to the north, via San Paolo to the west and vico Giganti to the east. Dating to the 1st century BC, it was built over a previous Greek building of the 4th century BC, also probably intended for theatrical performance. Unlike the Odeon which stood next to it and was intended for particular musical events, the theatre was uncovered.

Its structure has been used in the walls of present houses and the overall structure and many elements are still visible. A large part of the centre of the theatre is visible in an open area between a number of houses.

Two massive arches in via Anticaglia were reinforcement for the outside of the theatre and are incorporated into existing buildings.

The cavea had 5-6000 seats. The visible part is lower central cavea and includes one of the vomitoria still used for accessing the theatre. The summa cavea, the highest part, has been lost. The entrance to the cavea is from Via San Paolo through an ancient shop in the courtyard of a 15th-century building.

== Neapolis City Walls ==
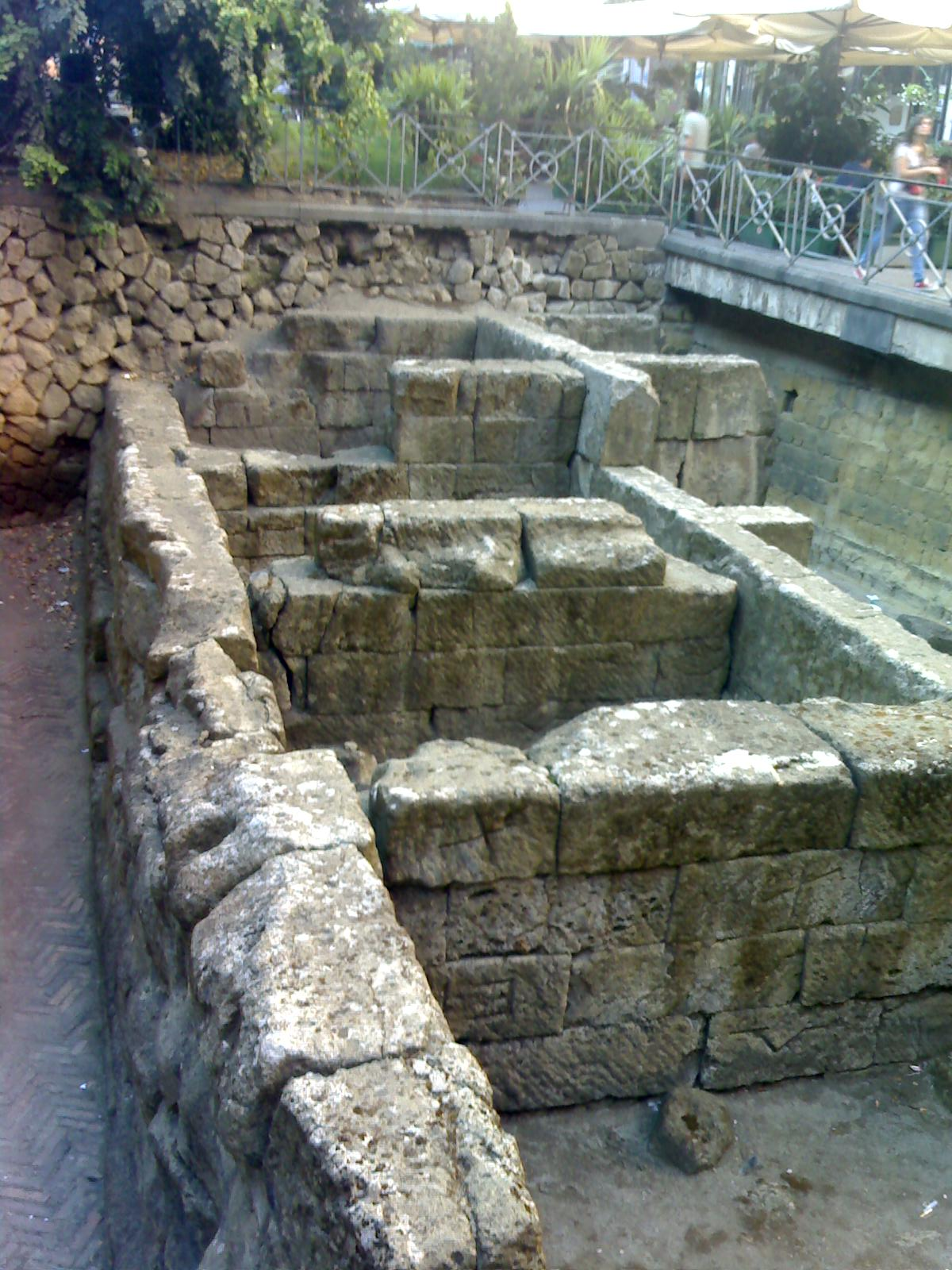
Greek Walls showing braced curtains in Piazza Bellini

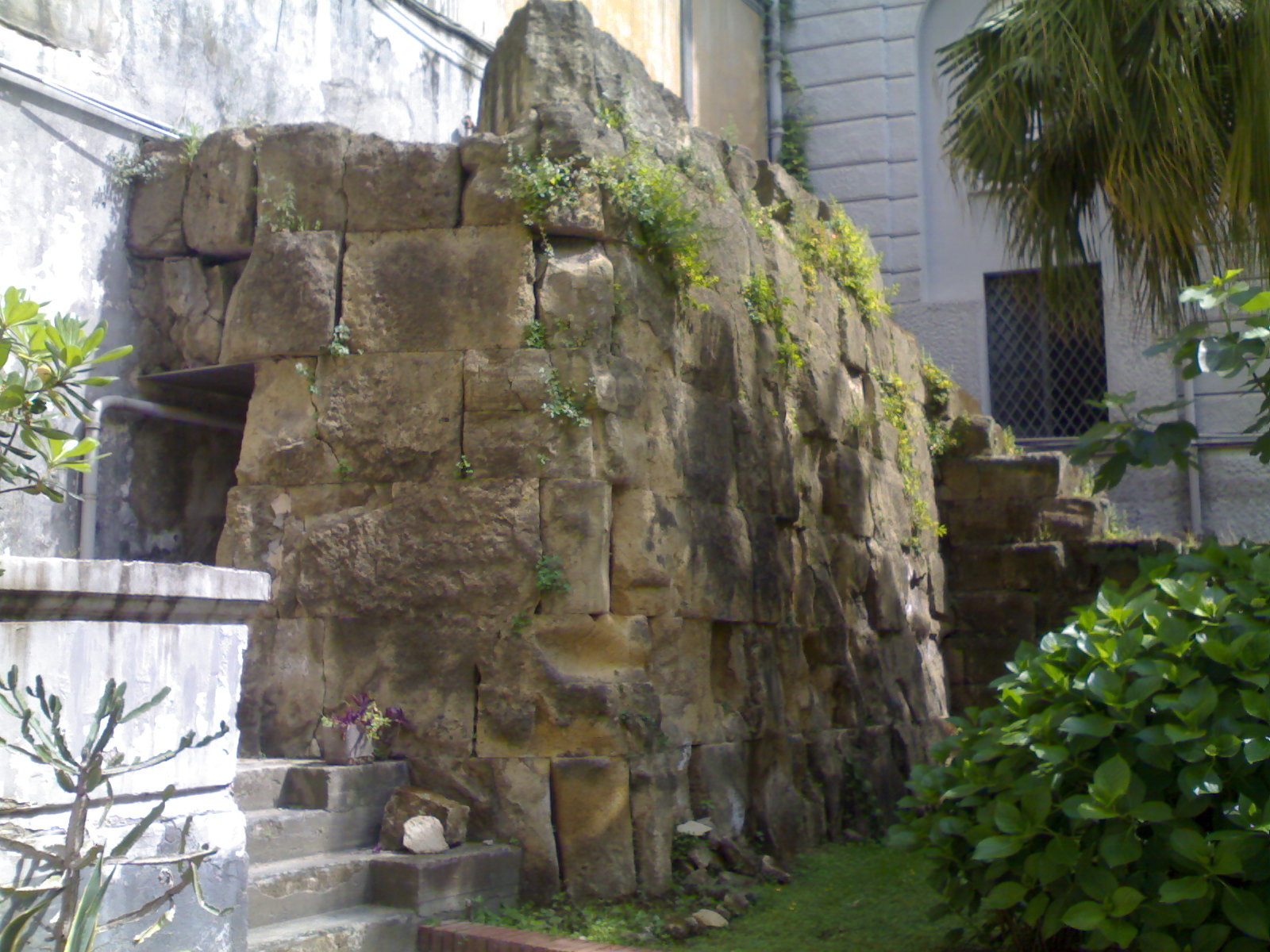
Greek Walls at the University

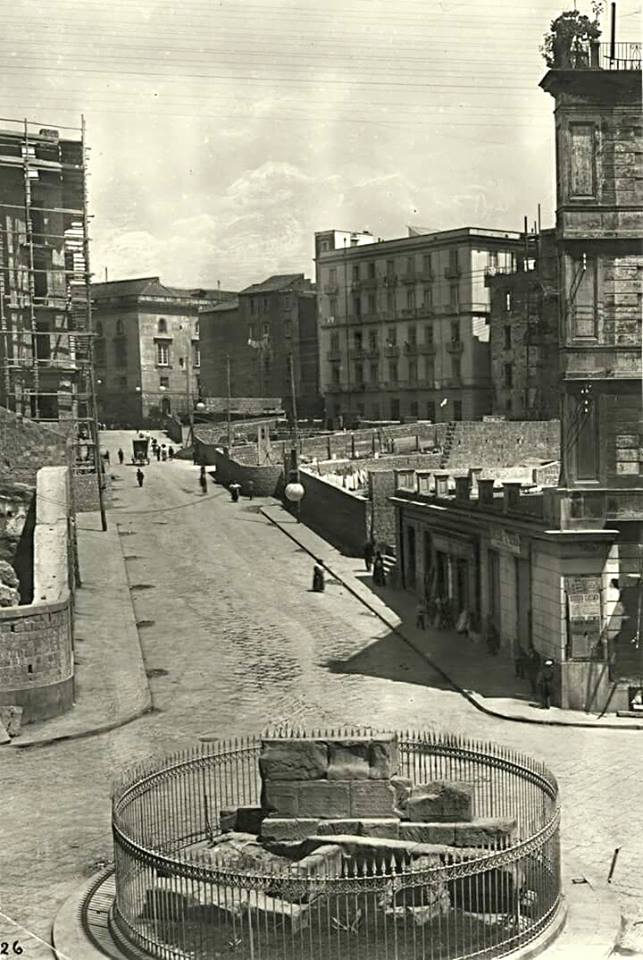
"Cippo a Forcella" in Piazza Calenda

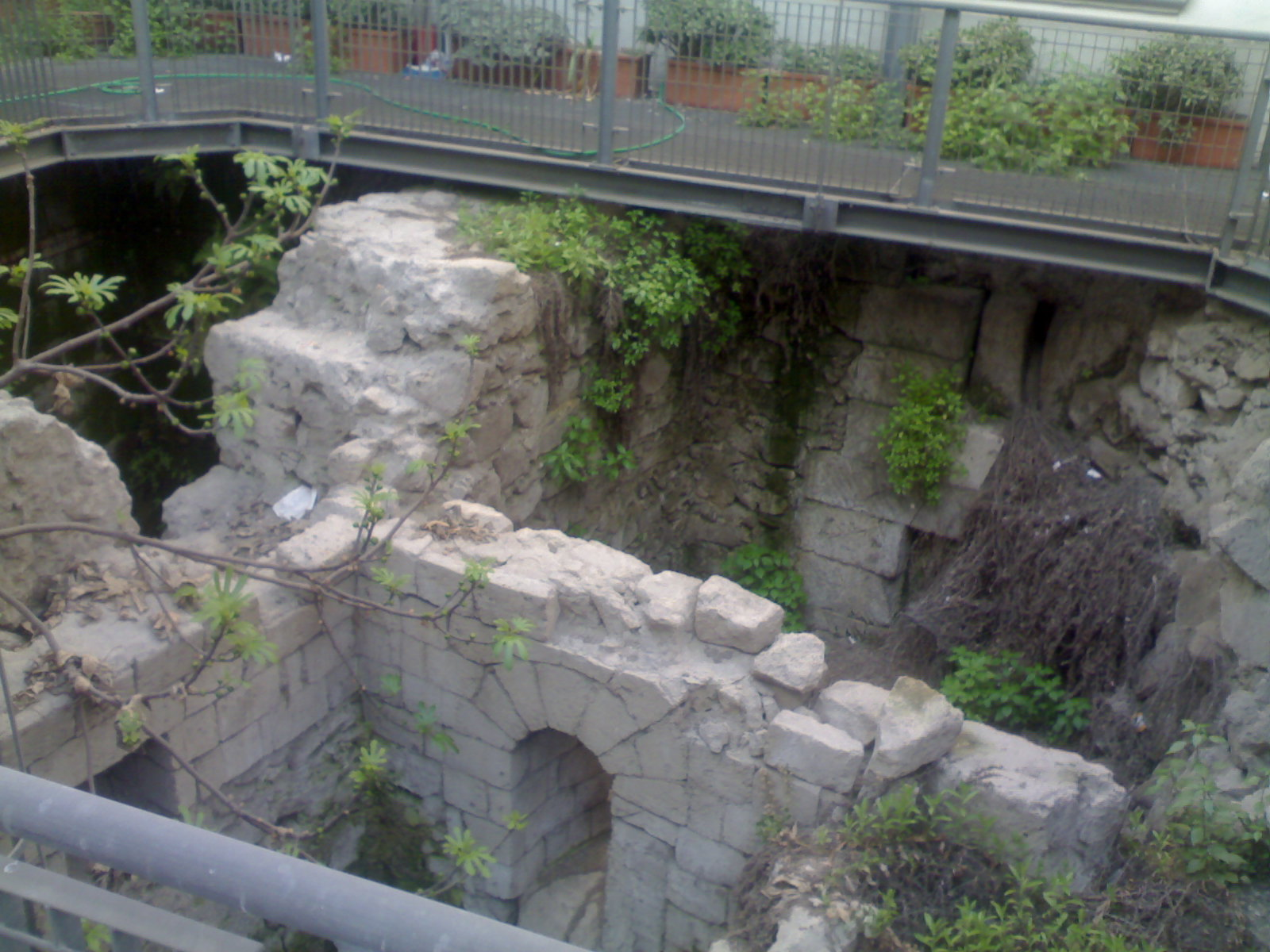
Walls in Sant'Aniello a Caponapoli

The first walls of Neapolis date from the 6th century BC. Remains are largely buried beneath the modern city but can be seen in several places where they have been brought to light.

The blocks were extracted from a vast quarry of the Greek age located in Poggioreale; it was identified by chance in 1987 following subsidence under the Pianto cemetery below the square of the church of Santa Maria del Pianto. The quarry has horizontal ridges corresponding to the height of the blocks and, surprisingly, the characteristic alphabetical marks of the ancient quarrymen. From the quarry the blocks were transported to the city along the straight line of via Nuova Poggioreale to via Casanova to enter Naples from the ancient gate where Castel Capuano is now located.

=== The Greek walls ===
The Greek walls followed the edges of the plateau on which Neapolis stands and the natural valleys that surrounded the town formed defensive slopes. The walls had a reputation for impregnability, confirmed by historical sources after the Hannibalic war (218-202 BC) and during the Gothic War (535–554) AD.

Several building phases have been recognised:

The first phase of the foundation of Neapolis (end of the 6th century BC) is distinguished by the use of grainy grey tuff orthostates. The wall was partly a single curtain which followed the crest of the hills, and otherwise a double curtain reinforced by internal wall braces which created cells that were filled with tuff rubble. The "keyed" type of masonry with overlapping blocks also belongs to this first phase.

The second phase of the 4th century BC (connected to the Samnite wars) is characterised instead by the use of compact yellow tuff blocks. It has a curtain wall with transverse braces in the same technique, built against the walls of the first phase which thus becomes the inner curtain. Characteristic of the second phase walls are quarry signs, single letters or links in the Greek alphabet which were carved on the individual blocks during quarrying.

Recent excavations have identified modifications of other phases dating to the third century BC.

=== The Roman walls ===
The dry tuff wall built by the Greeks was altered in Roman times; they used harder Piperno for the external wall and an internal curtain in tuff.

The walls did not undergo significant enlargements until Valentinian III (440 AD) built an extension towards the port area, attested by an inscription found in 1747 and by the recent finds of walls in Corso Umberto and in possibly part of the Byzantine fortification in Piazza Bovio.

The walls initially survived intact during the Gothic War (535–554) but they were partly razed after the city's surrender to the Ostrogith Totila after the Siege of Naples (542–43).

=== Remains ===
- The Cippo a Forcella in Piazza Calenda, erroneously called "Cippo" due to its shape of a large pillar, is the most ancient gatepost found so far, perhaps from the 6th century BC, from the Herculanensis gate (later called Porta Furcilla). The walls in Piazza Calenda are made up of large blocks of tuff that form a double curtain with transverse connecting braces. The walls continue below the road surface and the nearby cinema (not visible). The square was created after the discovery of the ancient walls, for whose protection the Superintendency sited nearby buildings backwards.
- Built inside the nearby Teatro del Popolo (Trianon Viviani) is a tower from the walls.
- The walls in Piazza Bellini were discovered in 1954. The ancient level was about 10 m lower than today, and this stretch of wall ran along the edge of a hill now completely levelled, and at the top of a valley now also filled (via Costantinopoli - via San Sebastiano). Scholars disagree in dating this stretch of walls: once it was all dated to the 4th century BC as an extension of the walls found in via del Sole; today it is considered to be of the 5th century BC, strengthened in the 4th century BC; but digs in 1984 did not confirm the 4th c. date and the problem therefore remains open.
- The walls excavated in the church of Sant'Agnello Maggiore are displayed in the nave.
- The walls nearby in Piazza Cavour (behind the Salvator Rosa school building) are almost entirely second phase; they have a scarp and stepped foundations and are preserved to a height of 9.2 m. A short distance from them, in the 1950s another 10 m high wall was found in a rear position, probably of the first phase, which was destroyed for the construction of the Maria Longo Ramp (few surviving remains).
- The walls and the lower decumanus displayed inside Palazzo Saluzzo di Corigliano in the "Aula Mura Greche" probably date to the 4th century BC.
- The Roman walls are visible in vico Santa Maria Vertecoeli at numbers 15, 17, 21 and 22 incorporated into modern buildings; they are important because they indicate the north eastern limit of the walls of that period.

== Archaeological area of the Naples Metro: Piazza del Municipio (Town Hall) ==
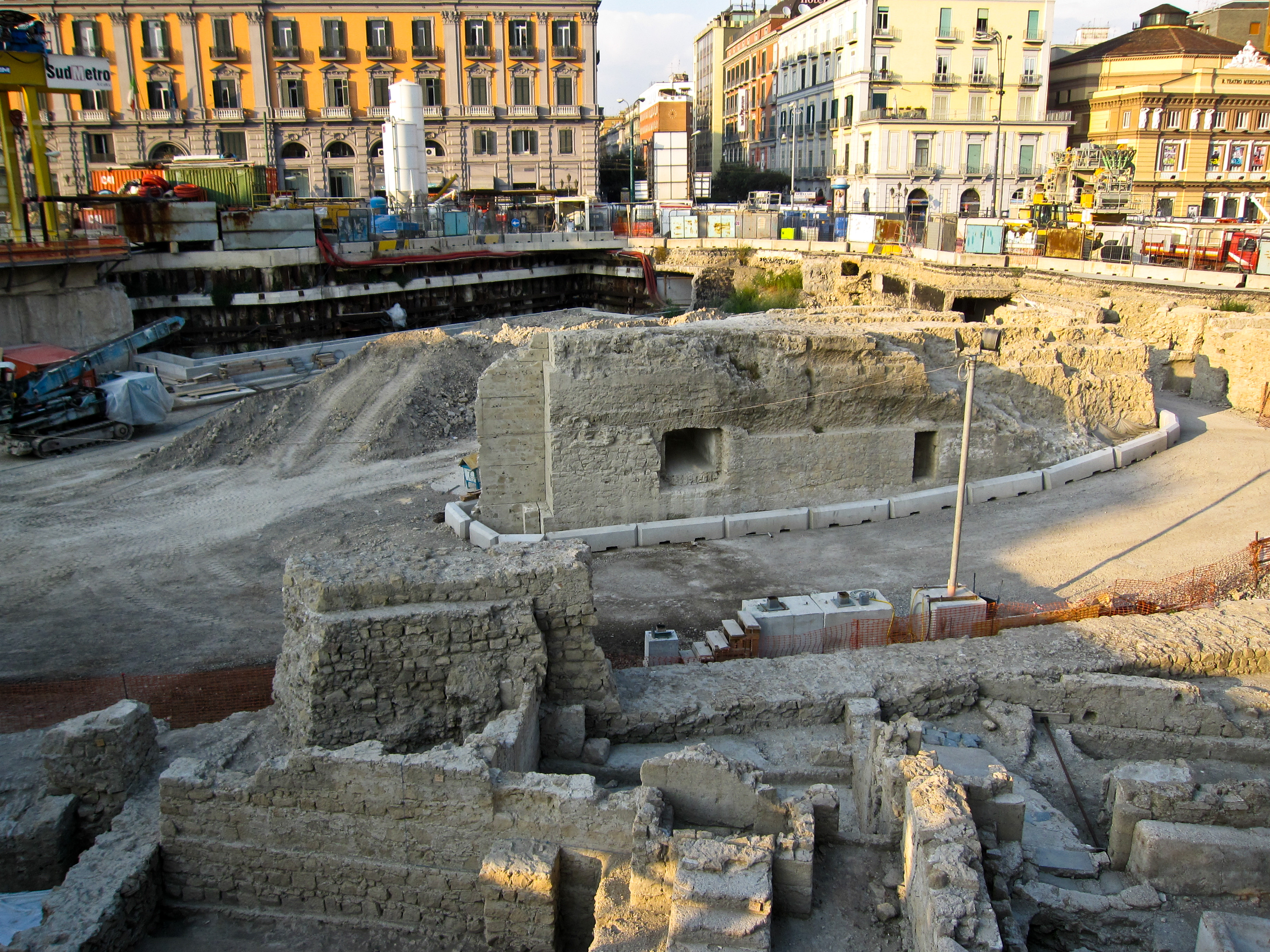
Piazza Municipio excavations

The excavations of the Municipio station have proved so fruitful that they have been described by archaeologists as the "wells of St. Patrick". In this excavation alone many thousands of ceramic fragments have been found. The result has been a combination of station and archaeological park with many of the ancient remains preserved in-situ.

The first discovery in 2003 was a 10 m-long boat of the 2nd century AD, found upside down and very similar to the one in Herculaneum in 1982. This made it possible to precisely define the ancient coastline.

The Roman port was brought to light in 2004, 3.5 m below sea level and 13 m below ground which settled the hypotheses on its exact location. In addition many items were brought to light: leather soles of shoes, coins, Corinthian seals with decorations of Bacchic scenes, balsam bottles, a considerable quantity of well-preserved ceramics (amphorae, terracotta pots, cups of African production), glass bottles closed with cork stoppers, rings to join the rigging with the sails, needles to mend the nets, wooden harpoons for fishing, Roman stone anchors and oil lamps.

Also in 2004 a second Roman boat was found, identical to the first, which led archaeologists to assume that the Romans had a fleet of harbour ferry boats.

Then a 3rd larger boat was found, 3.60 m x 13.5 m, from the 1st-2nd century AD. A 4th one was found with a very wide keel, with low beams and a flat bow so as to facilitate docking at the pier and loading and unloading goods. A total of 7 boats were eventually found together with the wharfs. A road along the quays was found, most likely the via per cryptam built by Augustus to connect Neapolis with Puteoli through the Crypta Neapolitana.

== Archaeological area of the Naples Metro: (Duomo Station) ==
During the excavations of the Duomo station (Metro Line 1) located in Piazza Nicola Amore, many finds emerged which are second in number only to those found at the Municipio station.

The first find at the end of 2003 was the remains of an imposing public building built in the Augustan age for the Isolympic Games. In 2004 the entrance to the ancient Gymnasium used by young people both as a gym and as a place to listen to philosophers and poets. Numerous architectural elements emerged: marble columns, fragments of the pediment, parts of the mosaic floor, the wall structure of a staircase (from which the steps were removed) and part of the side marble balustrades.

The temple of the Neapolitan Isolympic Games dedicated to Augustus dating from the early 1st c. AD was found. Marble slabs carved with the names of the winners of the Isolympics, in Greek, divided into categories (men, women, girls, boys) and disciplines (wrestling, boxing etc.). More than 400 pieces of these panels that had once covered the walls of a large portico in front of the Augustus temple have now been found, by far the greatest number of Greek inscriptions from one place in Italy.

== Archaeological area and thermal baths of Santa Chiara ==
It is the most important thermal baths complex of Naples and lies under the basilica of Santa Chiara. A museum section displays amphorae, ceramic objects and marbles dating to the 2nd and 3rd century AD.

== Subterranean Naples in San Lorenzo Maggiore ==
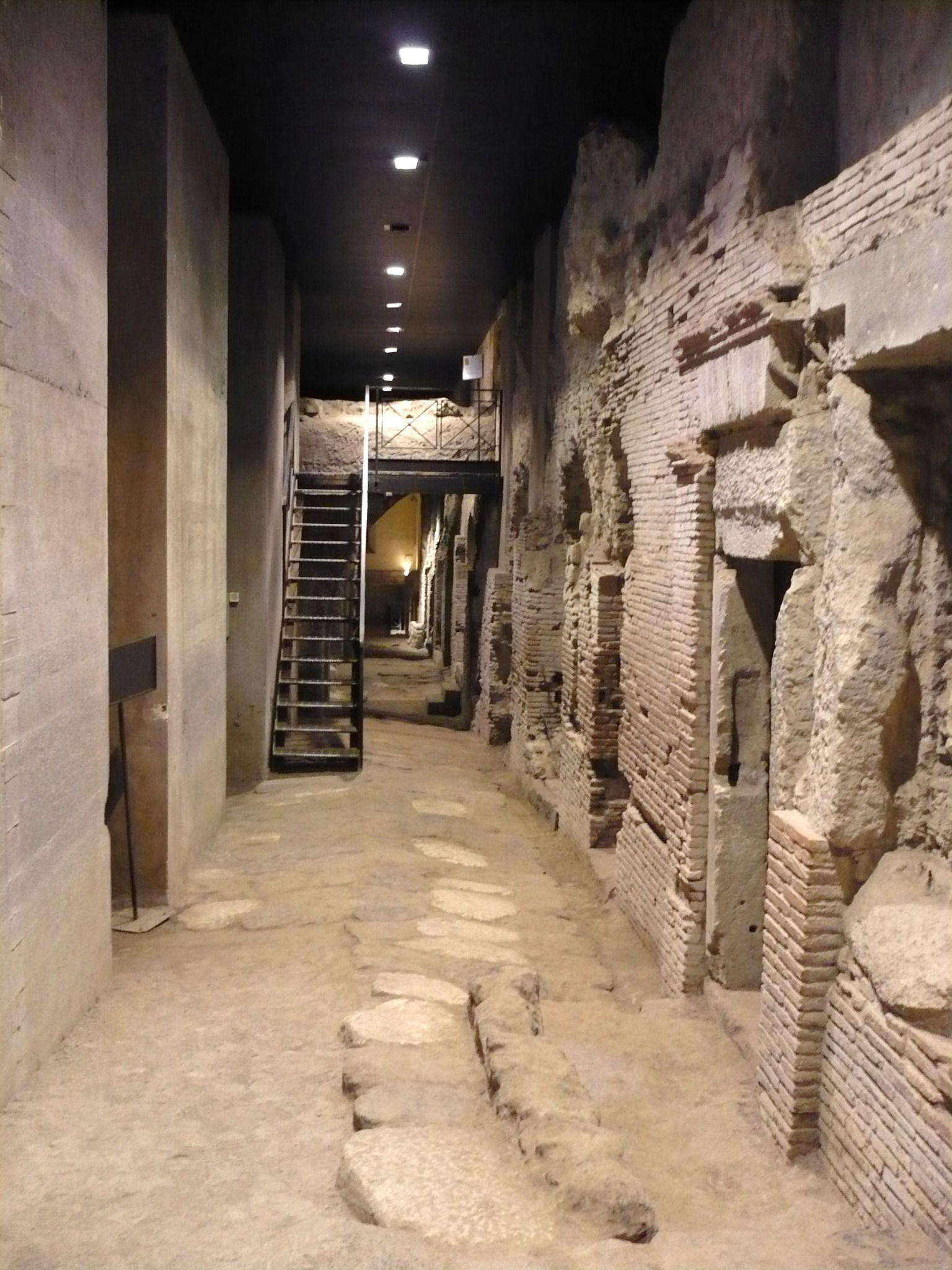
Macellum

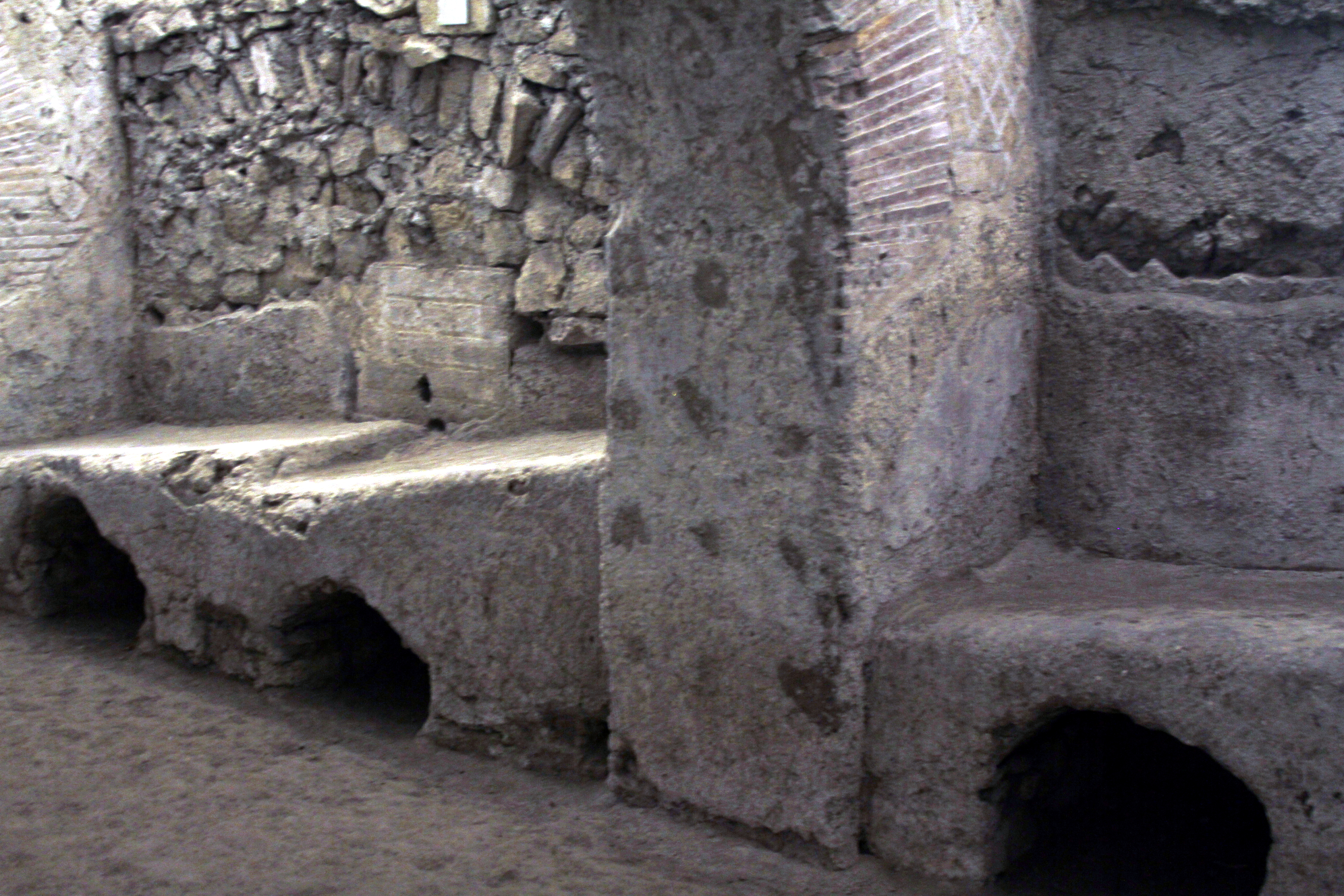
workshops

Located under the complex of San Lorenzo Maggiore and Piazza San Gaetano, excavations of the 80s and early 90s show the remains of the commercial area that developed around the ancient Greek agora dating to the 4th century BC with some parts from the imperial period.

It is located at the centre of the ancient city on the Greek agora or later Roman forum. On the northern side of the agora was the temple of Dioscuri. On the southern side is the shopping district including a large two-story building, the macellum (covered meat market), dating from the 2nd-1st c. BC, whose upper floor was at the level of Via dei Tribunali. It had a rectangular plan with a small circular temple at its centre and shops all around, some with workshops inside, and mosaic floors throughout. The colonnaded temple of the tholos type had a fountain.

Also visible is the decumanus maximus, the main street. Several elegant atrium houses border the street.

== Crypta Neapolitana ==
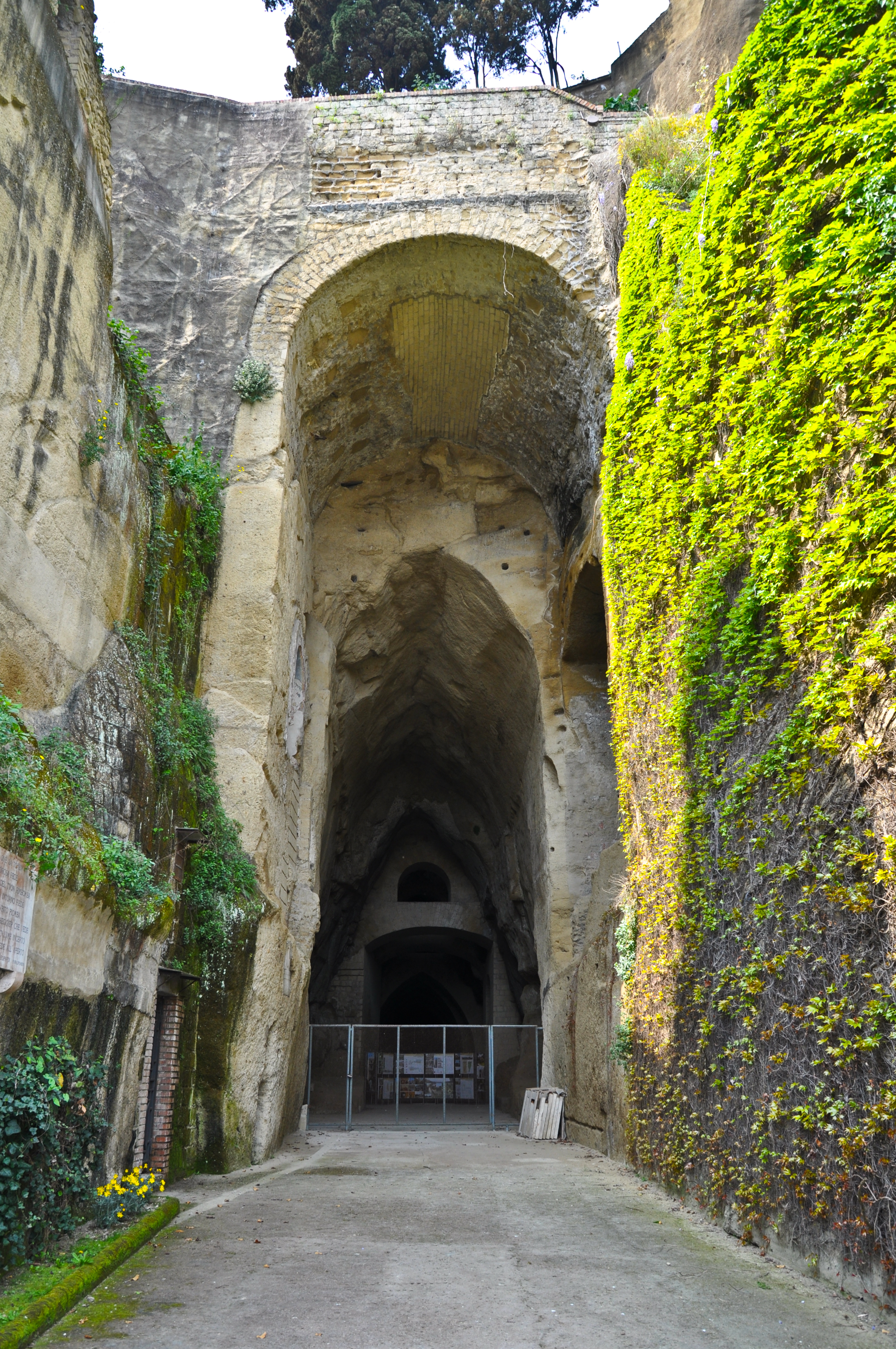
Entrance to the Crypta Neapolitana from the Naples side.

Located inside the Vergiliano park in Piedigrotta, the crypta is a tunnel 700 metres long dug into the tuff which was part of a plan by the Romans to build various military infrastructures at that time. After the fall of the Roman empire, the tunnel was used for civil purposes as it was able to easily connect two areas of the city very distant from each other, Mergellina with Fuorigrotta. The gallery was modified from the 15th century under the dominion of Alfonso V of Aragon and lasted until the reign of Joseph Bonaparte when he had oil lamps installed inside. There are many legends that revolve around the Neapolitan crypta, above all the one that it was the Latin poet Virgil, buried near the eastern entrance of the gallery, who excavated it.

== Posillipo Archaeological Park ==
The park is located on the Posillipo hill, outside the ancient city centre. It offers the opportunity to visit several archaeological fragments from the Roman era, as well as important sites such as: the Odeon theatre, the imperial villa of Pausylipon, the submerged park of Gaiola, the palace of the Spirits and the cave of Seiano, the latter 770 metres long, and commissioned by Marcus Vipsanius Agrippa to connect the villas of Pausilypon to the areas of Cumae and Puteoli. The villa today is in fact one of the two entrances to the archaeological park.

== Via per colles (The road through the hills) ==
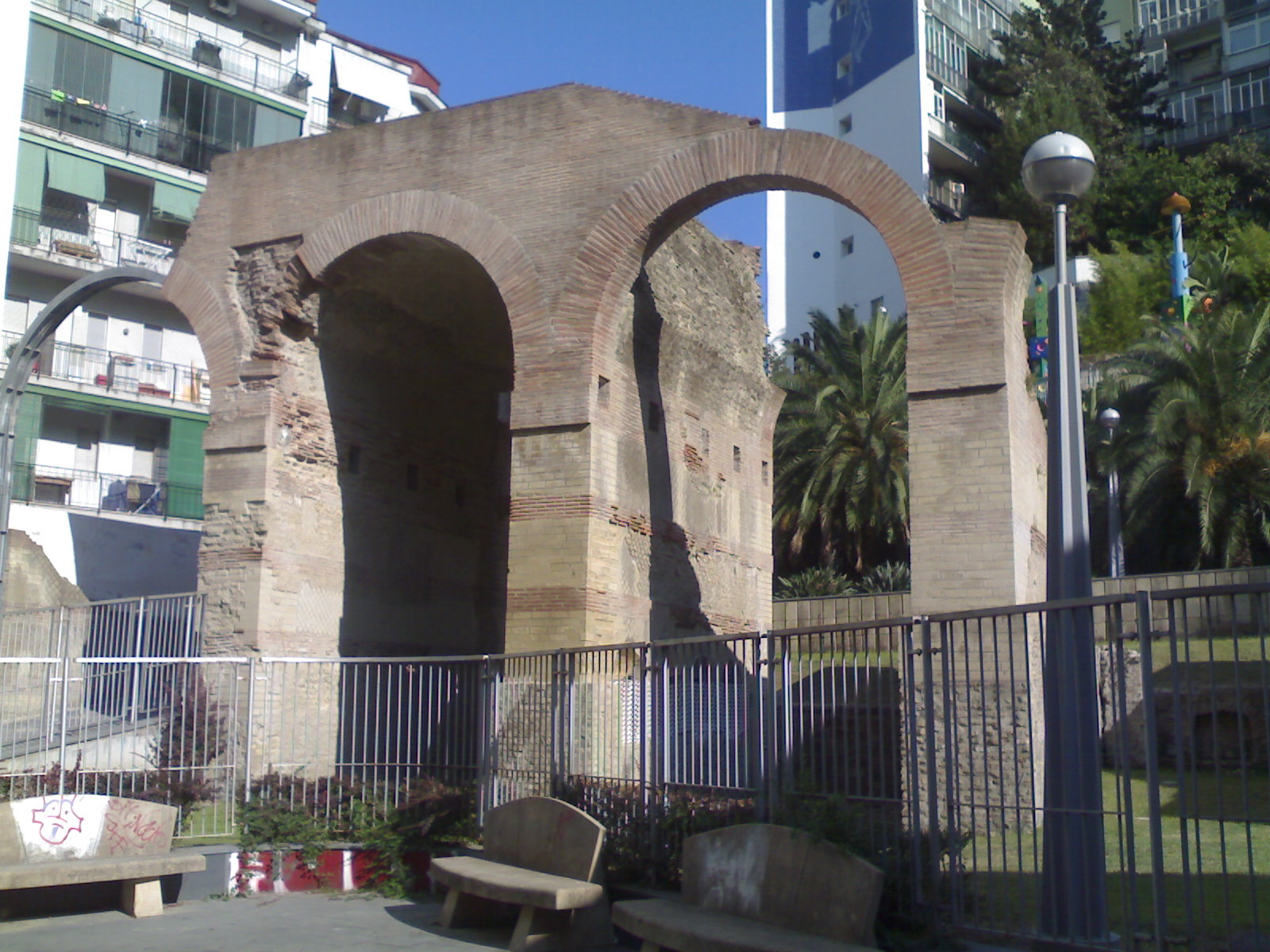
Via per Colles road bridge at Salvator Rosa

Until the beginning of the first century AD, before the excavation of the narrow and risky Crypta Neapolitana (the connecting tunnel) the cities of Neapolis and Puteoli (Pozzuoli) were connected by a 15 km-long road passing through the hills, presumably built by the Greeks. The Romans called it Via Neapolis-Puteolim per colles and transformed it into a real road in the 2nd century BC and improved it around 100 AD. It continued to be used because it linked the city to settlements in the hills and the tunnel was dangerous.

From Puteoli, after Agnano, Fuorigrotta and the locality of Marcianum, the via per colles went up the Loggetta and the Canzanella, reached the Vomero hill in the S. Stefano area, continued along Via Belvedere and passed through Antignano. After Piazza Antignano it went down Via S.Gennaro, Via Conte della Cerra, Salvator Rosa. Finally, after the area of Piazza Mazzini it descended along a path between the Ventaglieri and the Cavone to enter the city.

Along the road 3 milestones were found at the 5th, 8th at Antignano, and 10th miles. The inscriptions on the milestones show it was Trajan (98-117 AD) who completed the repairs on the road begun by his father Nerva (96-98 AD). The road is marked by remains of a bridge with brick arches found during the construction of the subway in 2000 in Via Salvator Rosa. The road is also traced by worked lava stones, probably paving slabs, incorporated into the tuff wall of Villa Salve that runs along Corso Europa.

== Aqueduct of Serino (Aqua Augusta) ==
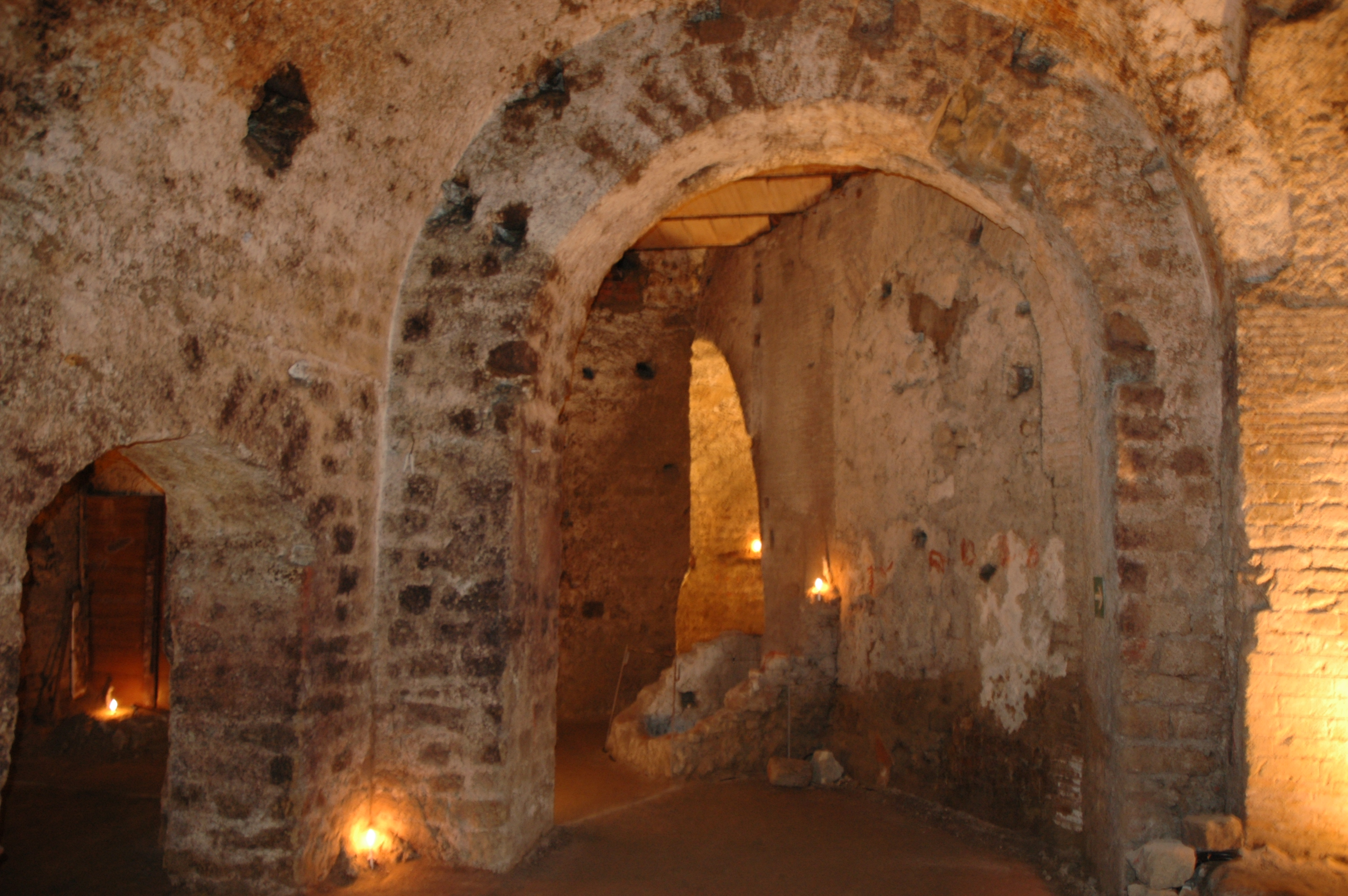
Arches in basement of via Arena

Recently, arches of the twin aqueduct have been revealed in basements between via Arena and vico Traetta and are open to the public. They run from north to south for a long section at a constant separation of 10m and after varying their directions come as close as 2m in the southern part. The western channel is Augustan, whereas the eastern part was added later.

They have sparked increased interest in research, which has led to more exploration of the line of the monumental aqueduct. An immense cistern on the line of the channels has been found next to the Hellenistic necropolis. Also a new piece of the ancient aqueduct has been identified uphill from via Foria in the “Miracoli” district where the channel runs underground for 220 m.

== Baths at Via Terracina ==
The aqueduct provided enough water to encourage the proliferation of thermal baths. Public baths were a key part of Roman social life, and their popularity grew from the late 1st c. BC to the 1st c. AD. While there were several baths in the region before the Aqua Augusta, many more were built subsequently.

At the end of the Crypta Neapolitana the new via per cryptam road bent to the north and reconnected with the old via per colles road (the present via Terracina) and here the thermal spa complex was built. The baths are extraordinary since they seem to have been located there specifically for travellers rather than for local residents. The Aqua Augusta provided the water for the bath complex and has been excavated nearby.

Much of the remains of this major archaeological site are visible today. It was a large complex with three principal baths: the apodyterium, the frigidarium, and the caldarium. It included a semi-circular latrine flushed with overflow water.

== Ancient Greek cemeteries ==
The ancient Greek cemeteries (necropoli) of Naples are extensive underground, often elaborate, tombs (hypogea) dating mainly from the Hellenistic era (4th-3rd c. BC). They were dug into the tuff at a depth (today) of about 10-12m, outside the city walls and many have survived because of their depth. They have the character of necropoli as many of the tombs were in series along a public road where travellers could admire the entrances.

These burial grounds represent the expressions of the Neapolitan aristocracy of the period, born from the union of Greek and Samnite elements. Furthermore, many of their contents and features suggest influences from the Middle and Far East. The sarcophagi of the burial ground in via Cristallini, for example, show paintings that can be traced back to Egyptian culture. The interiors of the tombs are often elaborately decorated with frescoes and contain sculpted sarcophagi painted in bright colours.

Most of the known sites are located between via Arena alla Sanità, via Santa Maria Antesaecula, via Vergini, via Cristallini (known as the Ipogeo dei Cristallini), via Foria and vico Traetta. Others include particularly:

- necropolis of Castel Capuano (5th century BC)
- hypogea in the Rione Sanità (4th - 3rd century BC)
- necropolis of Pizzofalcone (7th century BC). This necropolis was very important as it attested to the existence of Parthènope, with grave goods of Cumaean manufacture from the middle of the 7th to the middle of the 6th century BC, then a void of about two centuries and a revival between from the end of the 4th century BC.
- necropolis of via Santa Teresa degli Scalzi (5-4th century BC and Roman)
- necropolis of San Giovanni a Carbonara
- necropolis of Castel Nuovo (under via Medina)
- necropolis to the Holy Apostles

== Early Christian Catacombs ==
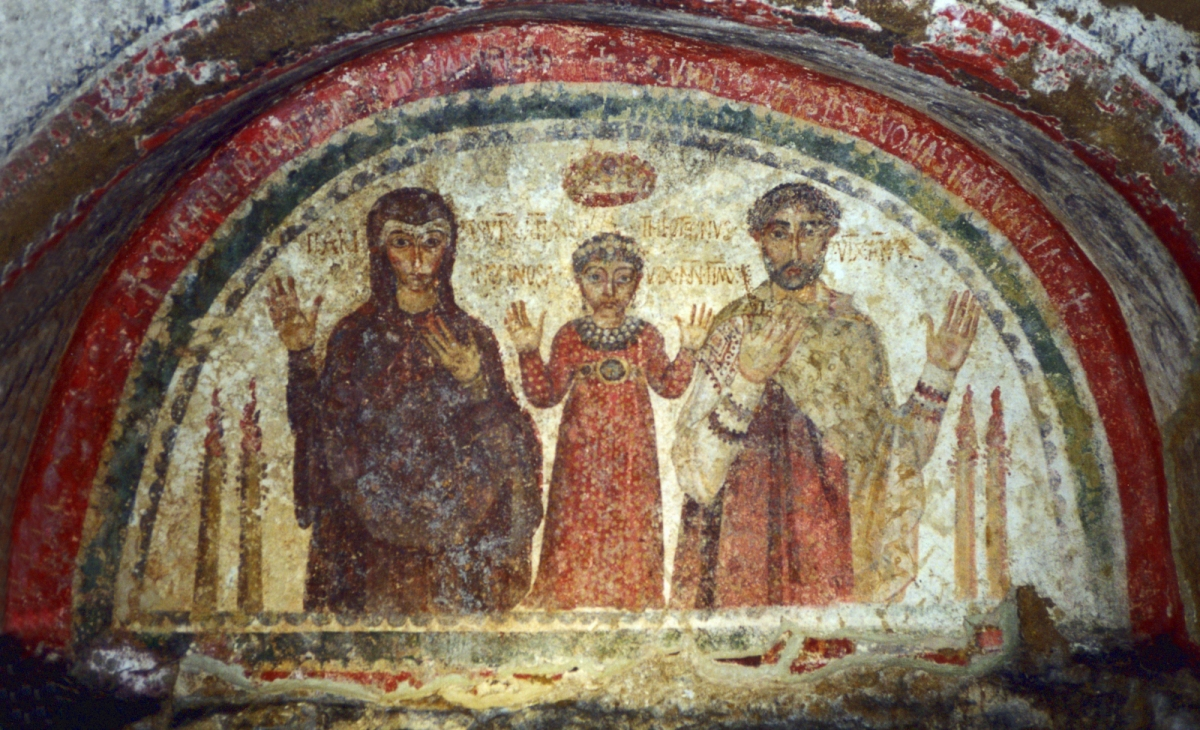
Fresco from the catacomb of San Gennaro

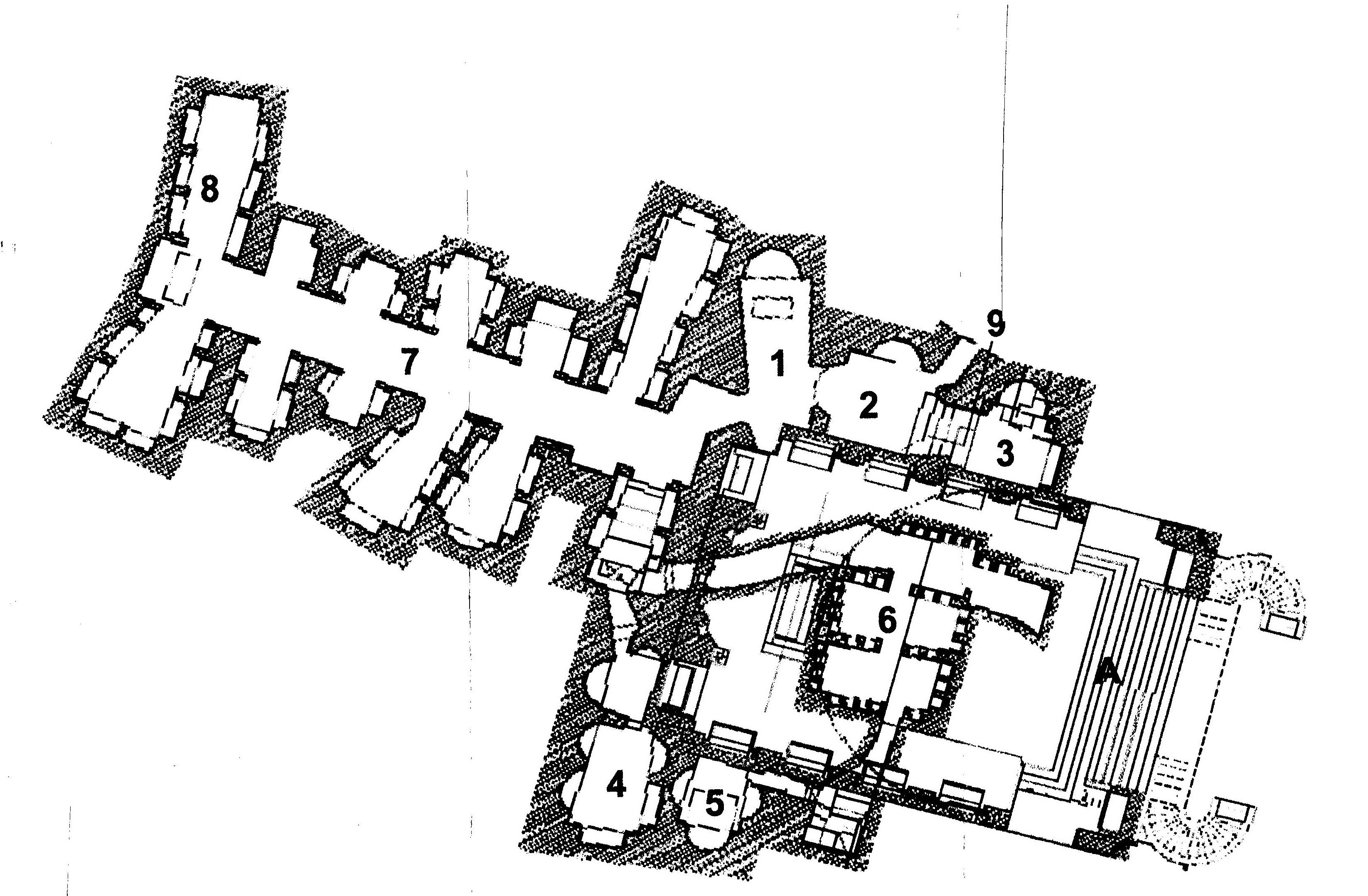
Map of San Gaudioso catacomb

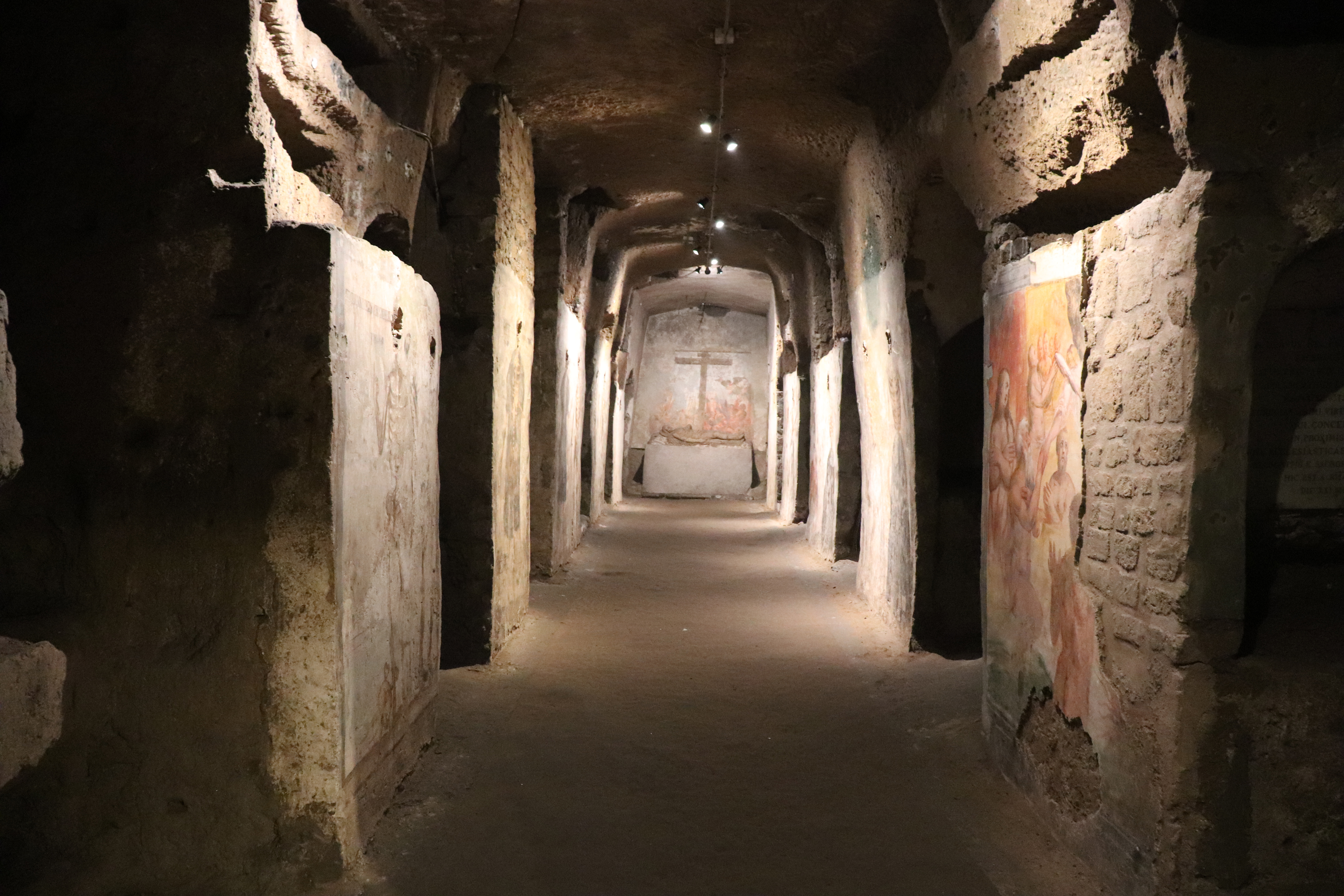
San Gaudioso catacomb

These often highly decorated underground cemeteries were dug into the tuff or other easily removed ground by the Christian community. In terms of archaeological and artistic importance they are considered third in Italy after those of Rome and Syracuse which are more extensive and numerous. They are mostly located in the Rione Sanità but extend over a large area.

Previously Christians were buried together with pagans but as the community became more numerous, they created collective cemeteries. At first the catacombs were used exclusively for funerary purposes and for the cult of the martyrs buried there but they became increasingly at the centre of the religious life of the city. The oldest city catacombs date to the 2nd century AD.

The main ancient catacombs known today are:

- Catacombs of San Gennaro (2nd century)
- Catacombs of Saint Gaudiosus (5th century)
- Catacombs of Sant'Eufebio (or of Sant'Eusebio, in the Capuchin Convent of Sant'Eframo Vecchio, from the end of the 3rd century)
- Catacombs of San Severo (late 4th century)
- Catacombs of San Pietro ad Aram (4th century) with paleochristian Basilica
- Catacombs of San Vito (2nd century, below the former San Camillo hospital at the convent of Santa Maria della Vita, although traces have been lost)
- Sepulchral Basilica of Sant'Eufemia (near the vicolo dei Lammatari, end of the 5th century)
- Sepulchral Basilica of Saints Fortunato and Massimo (near the vicolo dei Lammatari, perhaps end of the 4th century)
- Catacomb of the Augustan period in Piazza Santa Maria degli Angeli (recent discovery, 2011)
- Catacombs of Santa Maria del Pianto
- Catacombs of Sant'Elmo (or of Sant'Eramo or di San Martino)

== Other archaeological sites ==
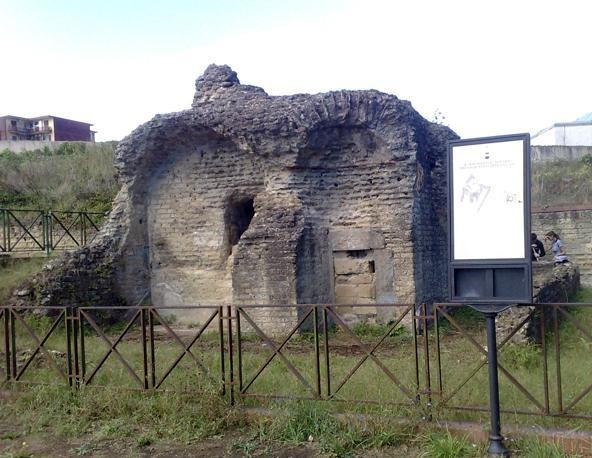
Roman Mausoleum in Pianura

- Remains of a large 1st century BC Roman villa in the Pianura district, probably built on a previous structure of the 3rd-2nd century BC; a large complex with 20 rooms, two large courtyards with colonnades, thermal baths, kitchens and reception rooms. The villa is located on the ancient road that led from Neapolis to the Phlegraean fields. Many of the rooms still retain extensive portions of mosaic floors, including that of the tablinum which has white tesserae with a meander motif and a central decoration. To the south of the excavation an earlier building of which some structures have been preserved is of the middle Republican age. In the middle Imperial age the east ambulatory of the western peristyle was divided into four rooms. Other modifications were done between the 4th and 5th centuries AD. The villa was probably abandoned between the 5th and 6th centuries. It was discovered in 2006 and excavated in 2020.
- Roman mausoleum/s of Pianura
- Villa of Lucullus

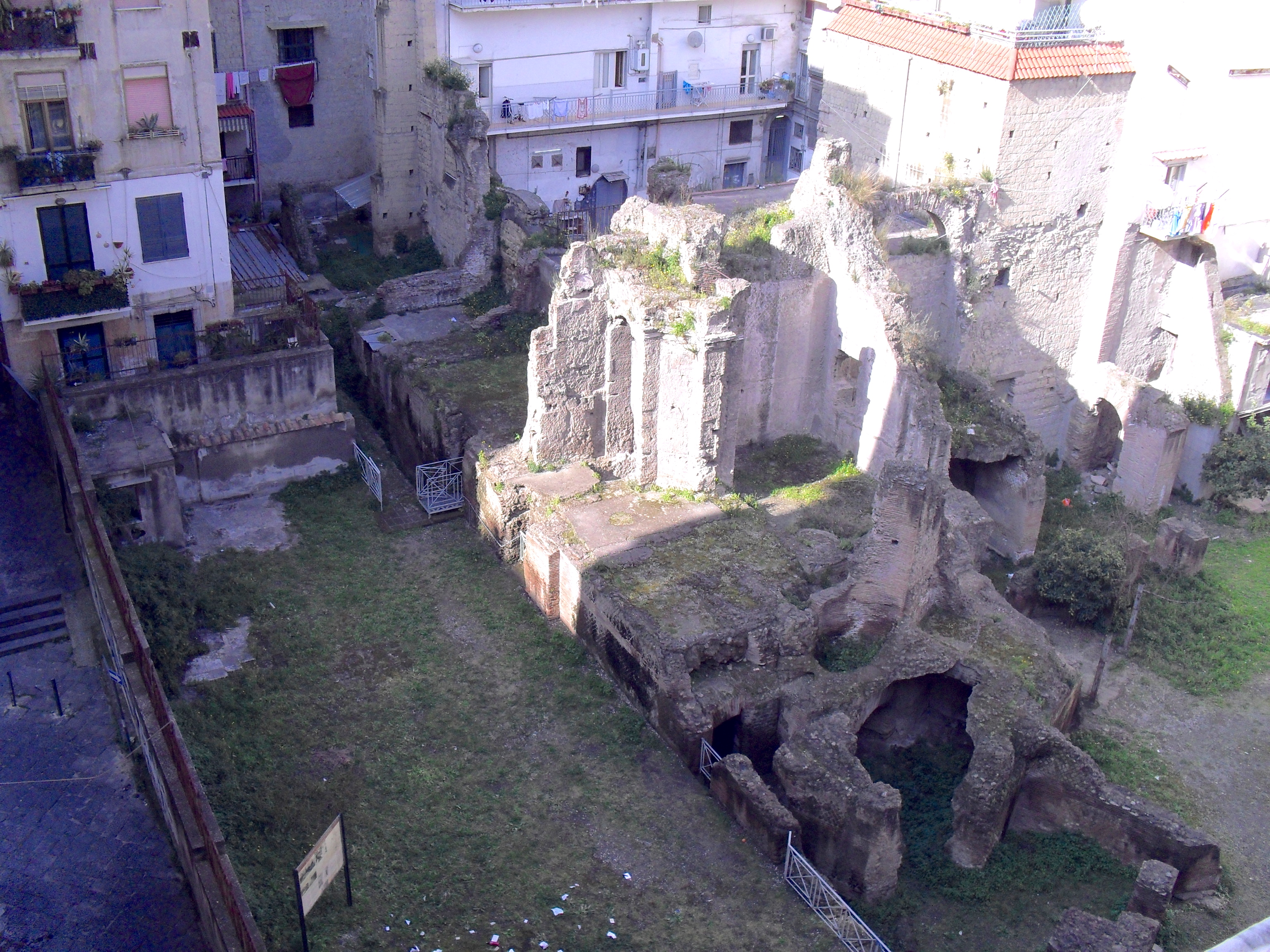
Domus at former church of Carminiello Mannesi

- Domus on site of church of Carminiello ai Mannesi. The church was ruined during an air raid in 1943 and from the rubble emerged the massive walls and foundations of a large Roman building occupying an entire city insula. Starting from a late-republican domus, another Roman building was built on it at the end of the 1st century AD with two floors. The lower floor was intended for service areas arranged around a large rectangular room with frescoes, while a small spa is recognisable towards the south. On the upper level supported by vaults and brick arches is a large rectangular basin covered with tiles and a small basin with a central stepped fountain, covered with white marble. During the Imperial era the complex underwent more renovations, the most important of which is the installation of a Mithraeum in two rooms on the lower floor: this is recognisable by the remains of a stucco relief visible on the back wall of the god Mithras in the act of killing the bull. Towards the west rectangular pillars create supported an external portico.
- Roman villa of Ponticelli
- Roman villa of Scampia. On the Via Tancredi Galimberti, this was a villa rustica with a farming estate. The presence of small thermal baths indicate that it was inhabited by the owner of the estate, most likely a Roman veteran, who had been entrusted with a large plot of land. Reports from local farmers speak of residues of mosaics and pieces of plaster painted in blue which lay in its rooms from the 1960s, suggesting the owner was wealthy. The villa was renovated perhaps by the first owner, with an elevation of the floor by almost one metre. Perhaps the elevation was necessary following regular flooding. There are also signs of extensions of different eras. It once had a large underground cistern which was unfortunately demolished when the road was built.
- Roman villa rustica of Cupa Marfella, Marianella. Discovered in the 1980s and dating from the 1st century AD, it has a rectangular plan around a central courtyard, with a series of living and working rooms on three sides, while the fourth has a boundary wall. On three sides of the courtyard was a peristyle. Perhaps it was built on the remains of a pre-existing republican villa.
- Islet of Megaride
- Monte Echia (rocky spur on which the Greek polis was built)
- The Bolla Aqueduct
- The Bourbon Gallery, a complex of tunnels excavated in the bedrock, dating to the Greek era when tuff was extracted and the caves used as cisterns.
- Greek tombs at Eremo di Santa Maria di Pietraspaccata
- Archaeological site within the Mostra d'Oltremare
- Remains of the Temple of the Dioscuri
- Remains of the Roman era in Sant'Aspreno al Porto
- Remains of a Roman domus and a spa complex in the basement of Palazzo Ricca in via dei Tribunali. The domus in the Banco di Napoli was discovered in the 1970s and dates to the 2nd century AD. It was almost certainly connected to the complex found and destroyed in the works in Forcella between via San Nicola dei Caserti, via Pietro Colletta and via Giudecca Vecchia. Two brick arches are visible which probably open onto a cryptoporticus, perpendicular to the street of Via dei Tribunali. Part of the cryptoporticus roof vault can be seen. The arches are in a huge room of brick work with a barrel vaulted roof, perhaps connected to other service areas further to the west. A second room has a mosaic floor with a geometric motif. In a second phase, this room was redecorated in the fourth pictorial style and a small pillar in opus vittatum was created leaning against the back wall.
- Roman remains in the cloister of Saints Marcellinus and Festus
- Roman remains inside the Maschio Angioino
- Archaeological excavations of the Cathedral
- Remains and archaeological finds of the Naples underground (Toledo stations, Town Hall, University, Salvator Rosa)
- Roman baths of Agnano
- Cave of the Dog at Agnano
- Neolithic tombs of Materdei
- Remains of the Camaldoli (Bronze Age and Roman Age)
- Roman mausoleum in via Pigna
- Roman remains in Pietrasanta
- Chiatamone and the Old Chapel ("Platamonic caves" already mentioned in Greek times)
- La Conocchia Mausoleum (destroyed)
- Archaeological remains (probably port structures of Parthènope) off the coast of Castel dell'Ovo
