= Villa Tertius =

Roman archaeological site

- Oplontis Villa B
- Interactive map of Villa Tertius
- 40°45′26″N 14°27′9″E
- Type: Roman villa
- Location: Torre Annunziata, Province of Naples, Campania, Italy
- Part of: Oplontis

The Villa of L. Crassius Tertius, also known as Oplontis Villa B, is an ancient Roman villa in the town of Torre Annunziata in southern Italy. It is the smaller of two villas at the Oplontis site, and may have been used for the production of wine, oil, and agricultural goods.

== History ==
Villa B lies 300 metres (980 ft) east of Villa A, and was partially excavated between 1974 and 1991. It is a two-story structure with many rooms left unplastered and with tamped earth floors.

Unlike Villa A, this villa was not deserted at the time of the eruption: the remains of 54 people were recovered in one of the rooms of the villa, perishing in the surge that hit Oplontis.

== Excavation ==
Along with the victims of the volcanic eruption, excavators found their belongings, including fine jewelry, silverware, and coins in the amount of 10,000 sesterces, the second largest by value found in the Vesuvian region after that of Boscoreale. The people were found in two groups: one at the front possessed fine jewellery, silverware, and coins, and the other group at the back had none.

A rare, very ornate strongbox was found in the peristyle, perhaps fallen from the upper floor, containing over 200 coins, jewellery, and a seal ring. It was finely decorated with inlay in silver, copper, and gilded bronze, typical of late Hellenistic design, and had a complex locking system that was still used in the 19th century.

== Site ==
Oplontis was buried in ash from the volcanic eruption of Mount Vesuvius in 79 AD. Recent archaeology has shown that it suffered unique type of destruction because of its proximity to the sea, similar to the boathouses at Herculaneum. The volcanic eruption generated a pyroclastic flow that sped down the mountain toward Oplontis. The impact of the flow on the sea surface led to a type of "tsunami" which caused the violent entry and deposition of a water-heavy layer in the barrel-vaulted rooms (similar to the deposit that buried the skeletons on the shore of Herculaneum).

== Construction ==
The Villa B property was likely constructed for the production of wine, oil, and agricultural goods. Some of the rooms may have had manufacturing purposes, and others were storerooms, while the rooms on the upper floor contained the living quarters of the house. 400 amphorae were recovered in the excavations. The discovery of a series of weights seems to confirm this theory; a bronze seal found at the site preserved the name of Lucius Crassius Tertius, apparently its last owner.

There is also a rare example of a Second-style painting from the Republican era.
