= Aurelio Padovani =

Italian fascist (1889–1926)

Aurelio Padovani (February 28, 1889 – June 16, 1926) was an early leader of the Italian Fascist movement.

Padovani was born in Portici. He married a schoolteacher in 1910, with whom he had six children, and he held the occupation of a clerk. Having volunteered for the Bersaglieri at the age of 18, he served in the 11th Regiment during the Italo-Turkish War and First World War, eventually attaining the rank of captain. On April 4, 1920, Padovani enrolled in Benito Mussolini's Fasci organization.

In 1921, Padovani emerged as the Fascist chief for the city of Naples. A charismatic figure, signups increased under his administration, and candidates sponsored by the Fascists fared disproportionately well in Naples in the 1921 election. He participated in Mussolini's October 1922 March on Rome and quickly became a prominent figure in the South thereafter, exercising supreme authority as the Ras of the Campania region. Just as quickly, however, internal rivalries and tensions increased. Padovani was an exponent of the left wing of fascism, and he criticized the party for becoming too bourgeois at the expense of workers' interests. An avowed republican, he also disliked Mussolini's overtures to the Italian monarchy. Padovani was also associated with Freemasonry, which Mussolini opposed, and so Padovani was made to give up his ties to that organization in February 1923.

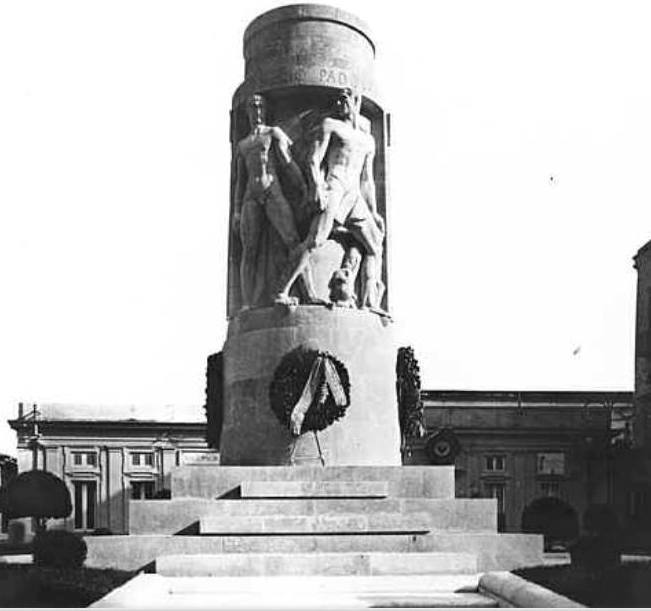
Naples - The monument to Aurelio Padovani destroyed in 1945.

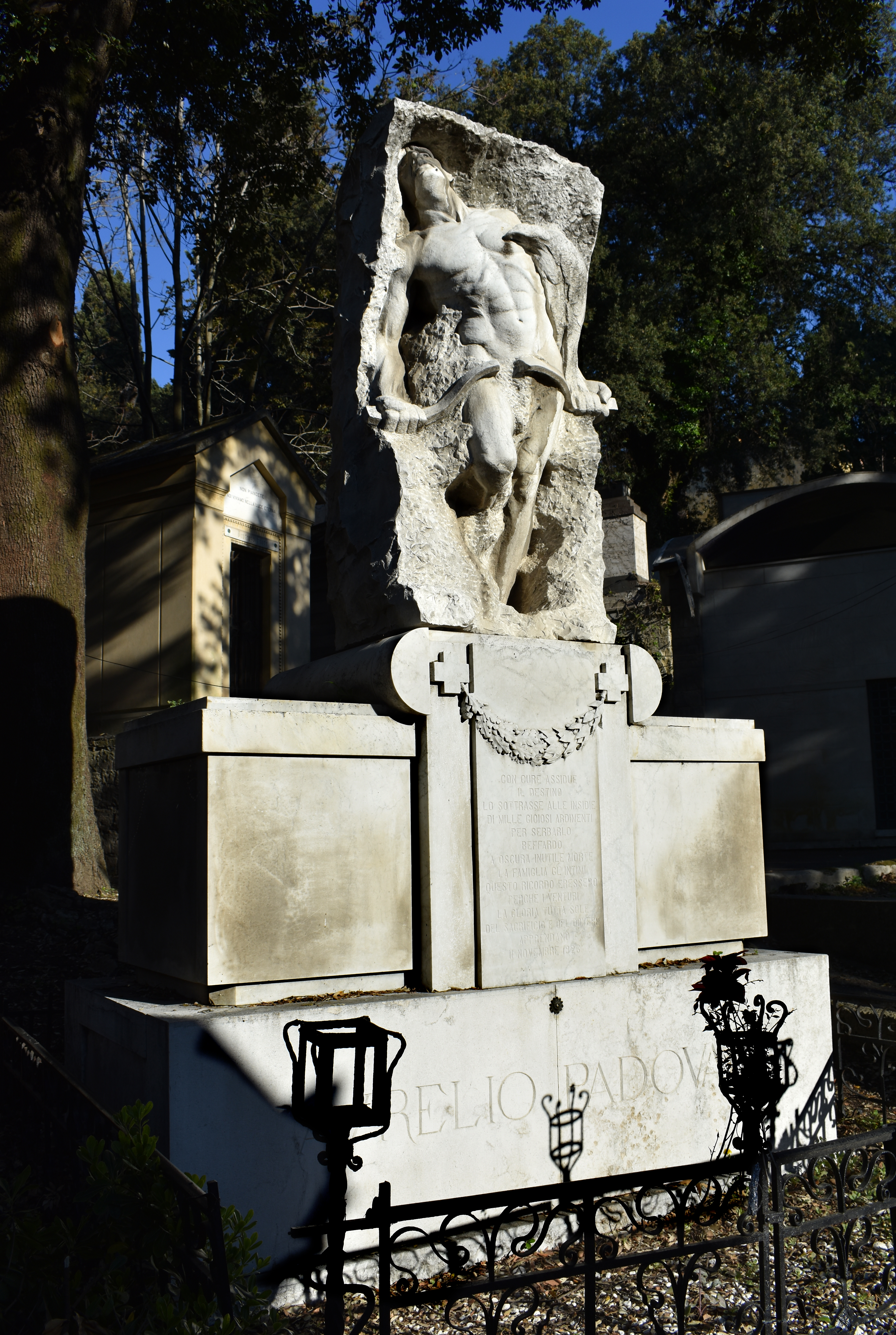
Tomb of Aurelio Padovani in Poggioreale Cemetery, Naples

Padovani opposed political compromises such as the merger with the Nationalists, seeing such moves as betrayals of fascism's "revolutionary" origins. This proved to be his undoing, as the Nationalists still held significant sway in the countryside, and a former Nationalist in the Neapolitan region, Paolo Greco, had important friends in business. On May 19, 1923, Padovani was compelled to resign so Greco could take his place.

Padovani continued to protest his loyalty to the Fascist Party, and he was later reinstated, though he never returned to public office. He was killed along with eight other people on June 16, 1926, when the balcony on the fourth floor of his apartment collapsed. The dramatic and peculiar circumstances surrounding his death were reported in foreign media. He was stepping out onto the balcony of his home to greet a throng of admirers, when the balcony inexplicably collapsed, killing Padovani and eight others. Foul play has long been suspected, as Padovani's lingering popularity and influence were a probable source of unease on Mussolini's part.

Thousands turned out for Padovani's funeral. In 1934, Piazza Santa Maria degli Angeli in Naples was renamed Aurelio Padovani Square and a huge monument was erected bearing his name. After World War II, the square's name was reverted and the monument was dismantled, its fate forgotten until 2010 when its remains were found in the Bourbon Tunnel.

Aurelio Padovani is buried at Poggioreale Cemetery in Naples.
