= Fortunatus of Naples =

Christian bishop

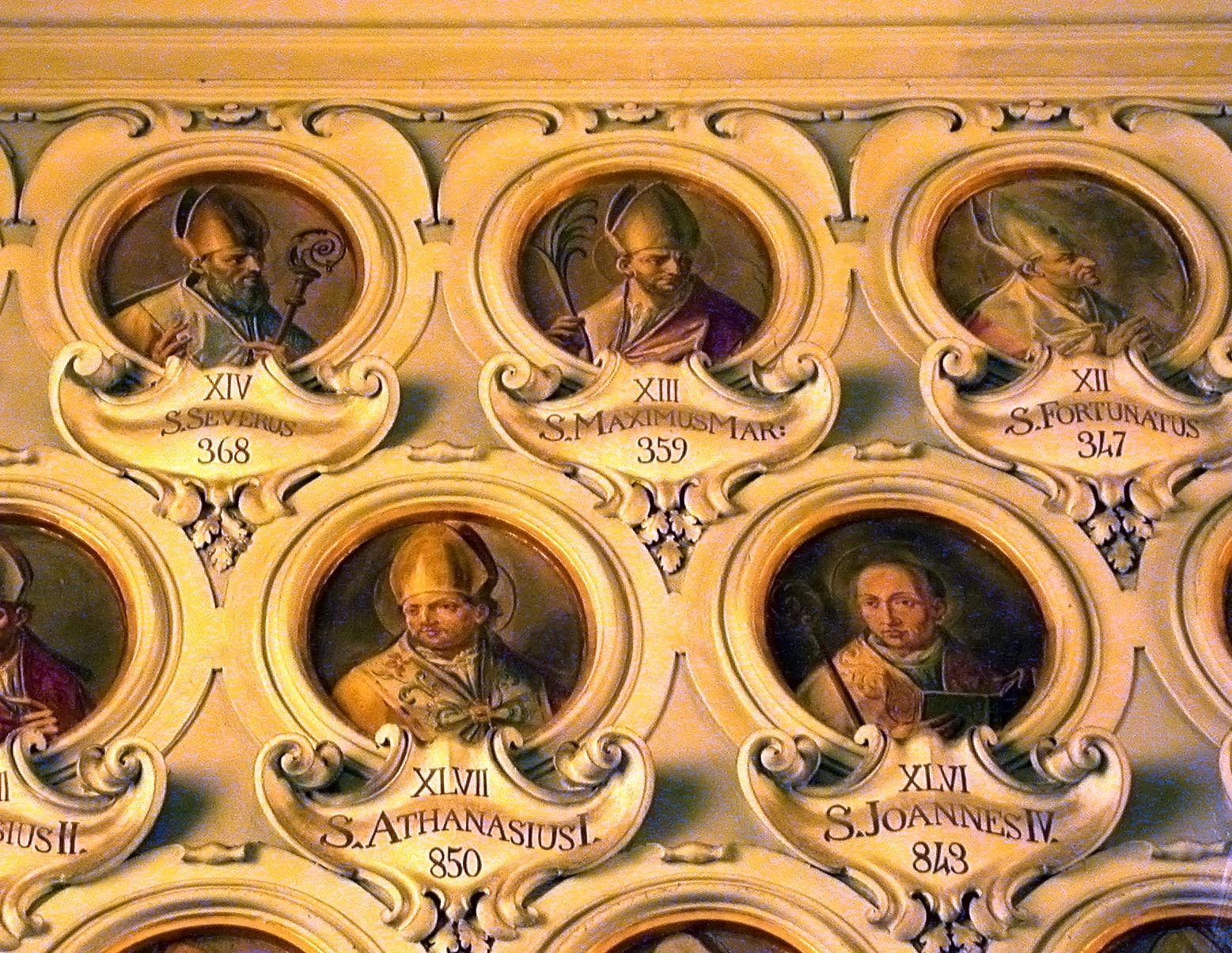

Bishop
- Venerated in: Roman Catholic Church
- Major shrine: Sant'Eframo Vecchio, Naples
- Feast: 14 June

Fortunatus of Naples was a 4th-century Christian bishop. He is the first historically-attested bishop of Naples, as one of the recipients of a letter written by those who took part in the Arian Council of Philippopolis in the 340s - his tradition states he was a fierce opponent of Arianism. His term as bishop is traditionally held to be 347 to 359.

He is venerated as a saint by the Roman Catholic Church, with a feast day on 14 June and a local feast in Naples on 8 November, the day when it celebrates the memory of all the "bishop saints of the Church of Naples". He is traditionally thought to have founded a cemetery basilica next to the set of catacombs in which he was later buried and which later became known as the Catacombs of Saint Gaudiosus after the 5th-century bishop Gaudiosus of Naples. Fortunatus' remains were translated by bishop John IV into the old Naples Cathedral in the 9th century. In the 13th century his relics were translated to Sant'Eframo Vecchio.
