= Bolla Aqueduct =

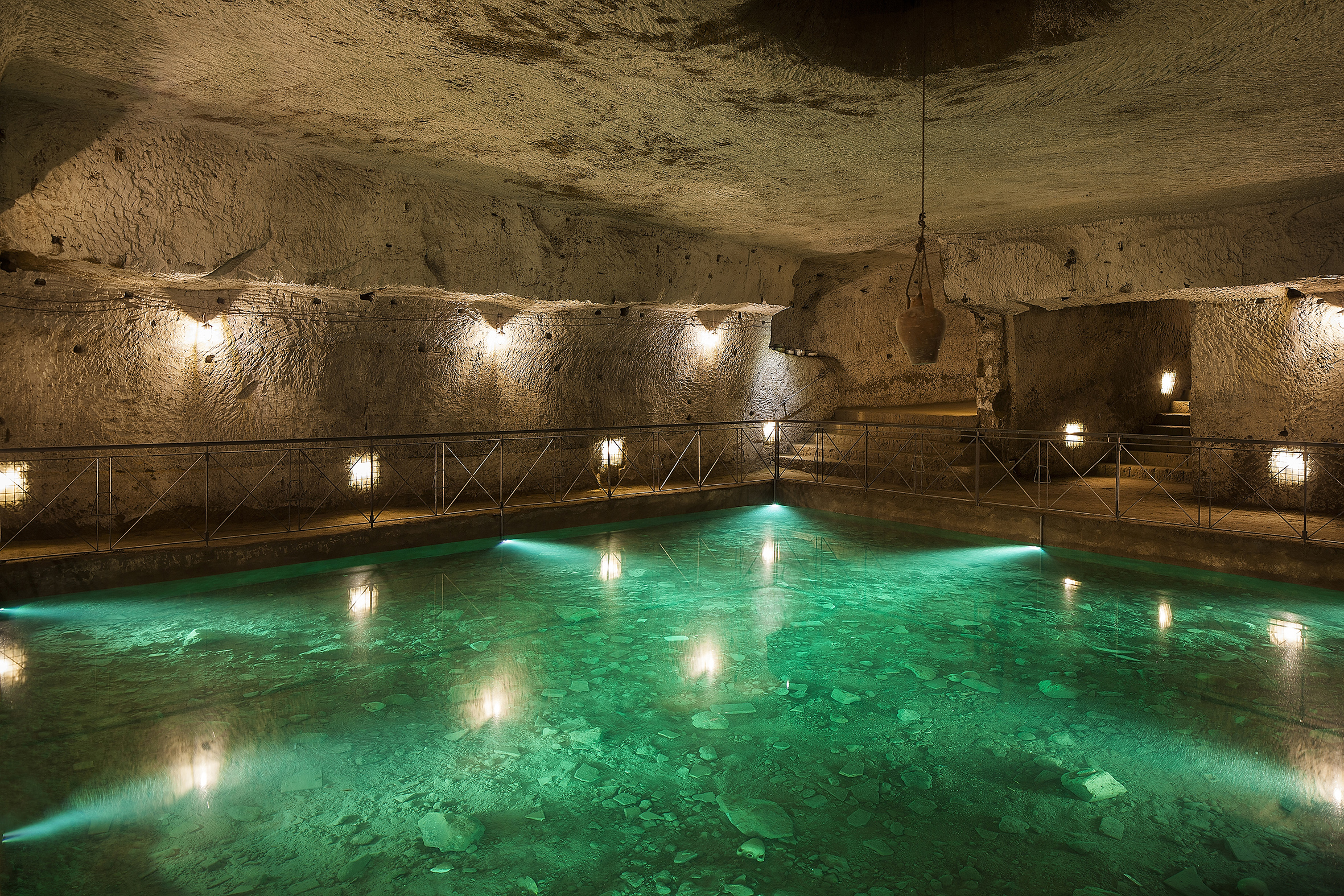
Bolla aqueduct and cistern in the Galleria Borbonica

The Bolla Aqueduct was the first aqueduct in Naples built around 400 BC by the Greek inhabitants. It was about 10 km long, bringing water from a marshy depression near Mount Vesuvius, known as the "Volla” plain, which was in turn supplied by an aquifer of pyroclastic and sedimentary deposits laid down in Vesuvius' many eruptions.

It reached the city at Porta Capuana before splitting into a network of underground channels leading to private wells. It remained a major water source for the city until being replaced by the Serino aqueduct in the late 19th century. The Bolla still supplies water to outer areas of Naples for industrial use.
