= Oplontis =

Ancient Roman archaeological site

- Interactive map of Oplontis
- 40.757°N 14.453°E
- Location: Torre Annunziata, Province of Naples, Campania, Italy

Site notes
- Management: Soprintendenza Speciale per i Beni Archeologici di Napoli e Pompei
- Website: Oplontis (in Italian)

UNESCO World Heritage Site
- Official name: Archaeological Areas of Pompeii, Herculaneum, and Torre Annunziata
- Type: Cultural
- Criteria: iii, iv, v
- Designated: 1997 (21st session)
- Reference no.: 829
- Region: Europe and North America

Oplontis is an ancient Roman archaeological site, located in the town of Torre Annunziata, south of Naples in the Campania region of southern Italy. The excavated site comprises two Roman villas, the best-known of which is Villa A, the so-called Villa Poppaea.

The ancient name Oplontis appears on the Tabula Peutingeriana, a medieval copy of a Roman road map, where it is shown as a stop six miles from Herculaneum and three from Pompeii and Stabiae. The symbol used on the map indicates that it possessed thermal baths. No ancient writer mentions the name, and the origin of the word is uncertain: suggestions include a derivation from Latin opulentia (opulence), opla (a place of fishermen), or Greek oplon (perhaps alluding to armed soldiers). An alternative theory links the name to a transcription error for ob fontis (near the spring), given the area's thermal activity.

Like the nearby towns of Pompeii and Herculaneum, Oplontis was buried in ash during the volcanic eruption of Mount Vesuvius in 79 AD. However, the force of the eruption was even stronger than at these cities as not only roofs collapsed, but walls and columns were broken and pieces thrown sideways.

== History and excavations ==
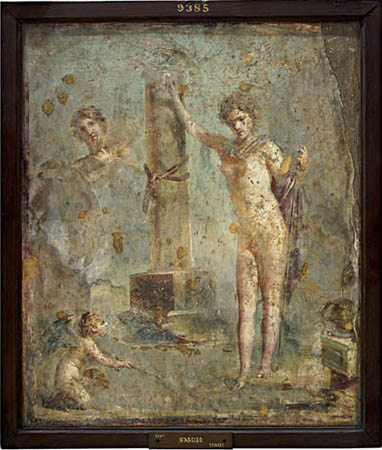
Fresco from Villa Caius Siculius Caius Filius

The town of Oplontis probably developed under where Torre Annunziata stands today. Excavations have revealed buildings particularly on the east and west sides of the town, the eastern one in the immediate vicinity of Villa A and the other almost at its boundary with Torre del Greco. It is thought that in antiquity, as elsewhere (e.g. at Herculaneum and Stabiae), luxury residential villas like Villa A lined the coast, whereas most productive (agricultural) villas were located farther inland.

Oplontis and other cities affected by the eruption of Mount Vesuvius in AD 79. The black cloud represents the general distribution of ash and cinder. Modern coast lines are shown.

Among the finds in the western zone, the most important is the Roman bath complex on the sea shore at Oncino (the Terme Nunziante) as a public building of Oplontis. R. Liberatore recorded the archaeology in detail and he identified it as belonging to Lucius Nonius Florus whose name is stamped on the edge of a terracotta basin in the baths, decorated with vegetal forms and galloping horses.

Unfortunately, the construction of the modern baths above them caused their destruction. Later two underground water supply or drainage tunnels belonging to the baths were found.

In addition remains of two residential villas were discovered nearby, one owned by Caius Siculius Caius Filius whose seal was found and from which a fine fresco was retrieved, though many other remains in the area were destroyed and stolen.

=== Excavations of Villa A ===
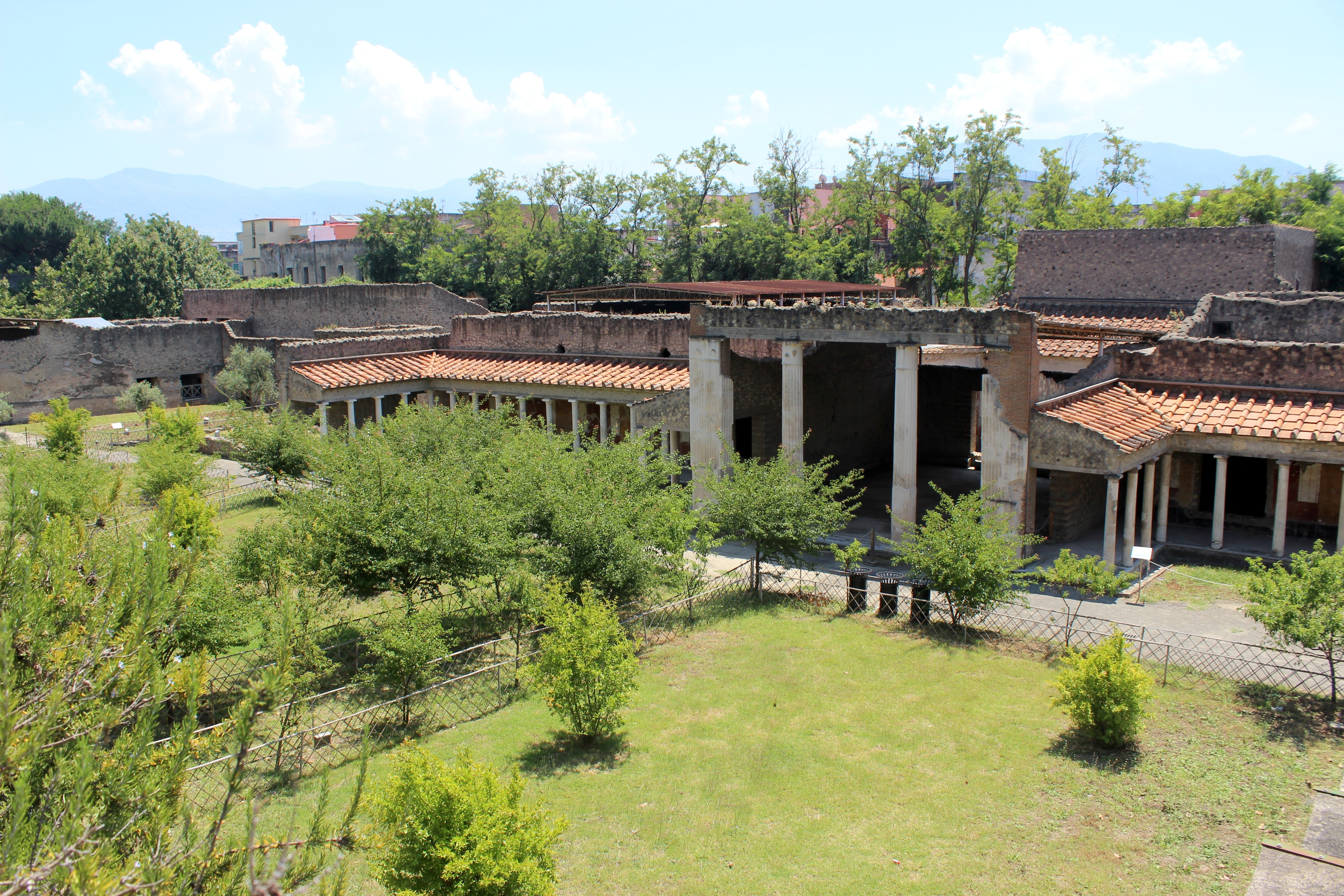
Ancient main entrance to the Villa Poppaea

The first of the villas, known as Villa A, was discovered in 1593–1600 during the great construction project by Fontana of the Sarno aqueduct to feed the mills at Torre Annunziata, the same aqueduct that was tunnelled through Pompeii where he also found the first remains, but similarly no attempt was made to explore the ruins in Oplontis. This aqueduct still runs through the centre of Villa A. In 1785 the Spanish architect Francesco La Vega explored this area, known as Le Mascatelle, and found beautiful objects and tunnels but soon gave up due to toxic gases.

In 1839–40 excavations in tunnels were restarted by Michele Rusca using La Vega's publications and he discovered for the first time the extent and quality of the building including two peristyles, mosaics and other decorations. He had to stop due to lack of funds.

From 1880 a series of mills and pasta factories were built in Via Fontanelle in the Oplontis area and ancient Roman walls, marble columns, mosaic pavements, and many fragments from a variety of objects were found in their foundation trenches. At the Iennaco pasta factory were found marble basins and lead pipes, two marble statuettes of “exquisite Greek production” one of the goddess Minerva. Many mosaics and frescoes were destroyed. A spring of mineral water erupted during drilling at a depth of 11m and its water was marketed.

In 1934, during construction of a private building in Via Fontanelle more finds came to light. Remains were found of some opus reticulatum and of a probable cryptoporticus. Vincenzo Cuccurullo ordered test trenches to be dug to which brought to light another perimeter wall in opus incertum with light traces of white plaster along with reminants of a vault.

From this time ever more frequent finds came to light as the town expanded and gradually it became clear that there was an important Roman site on the hill of Le Mascatelle. The "Friends of Oplontis" committee of volunteers was established in 1962 to promote proper excavation.

It was only in 1964 that a full-scale excavation was officially approved. However, even then it was somewhat chaotic and no official records were kept until 1971 when most of the rooms had already been exposed. Valuable information and many frescoes were lost during the period from excavation to final reconstruction. Even after 1971, records were not accurate and omitted details and discoveries that rendered proper reconstruction impossible.

In 1975 the only human skeleton was found at the northern edge of the site, an adult lying on its back 6 m above the floor of the villa who must have been carried by the volcanic flow probably from farther inland.

Today about 60% of the villa has been exposed.

=== History of Villa A ===
The oldest part of the building dates from c. 50 BC to which its Second-Style wall paintings belong.

Badly damaged in the AD 62 Pompeii earthquake, parts of the villa were rebuilt with Third-Style frescoes, also as famous as the earlier ones for their quality.

Villa A was probably uninhabited and still in the process of being rebuilt at the time of the AD 79 eruption, as a number of tools were found on the site and statues and columns were stored away from their proper places.

The power of the eruption made roofs and walls collapse, columns to break and be thrown sideways so that on excavation many pieces of walls were difficult to reassemble.

=== Villa B ===
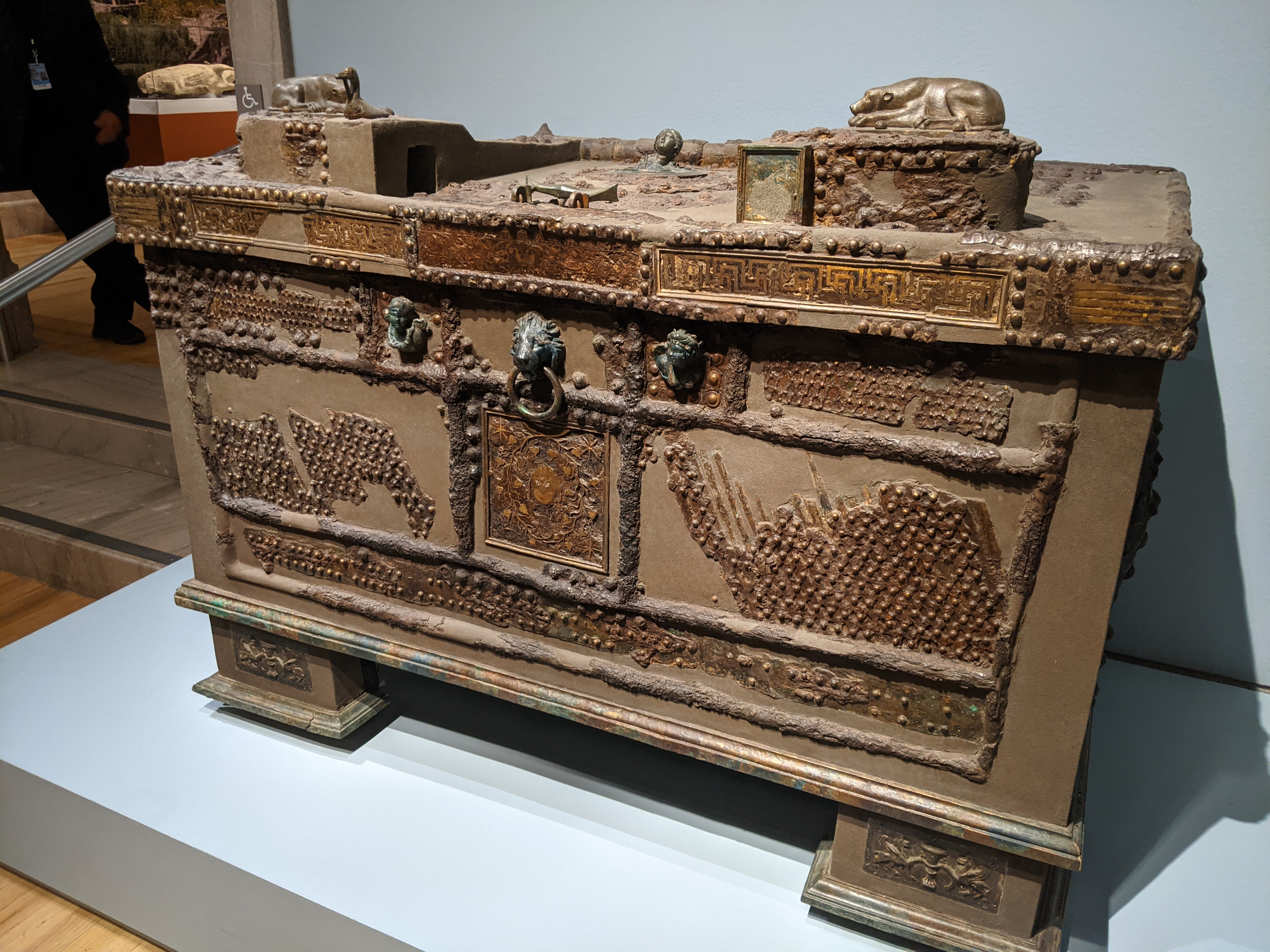
Arca (strongbox) with applied decoration

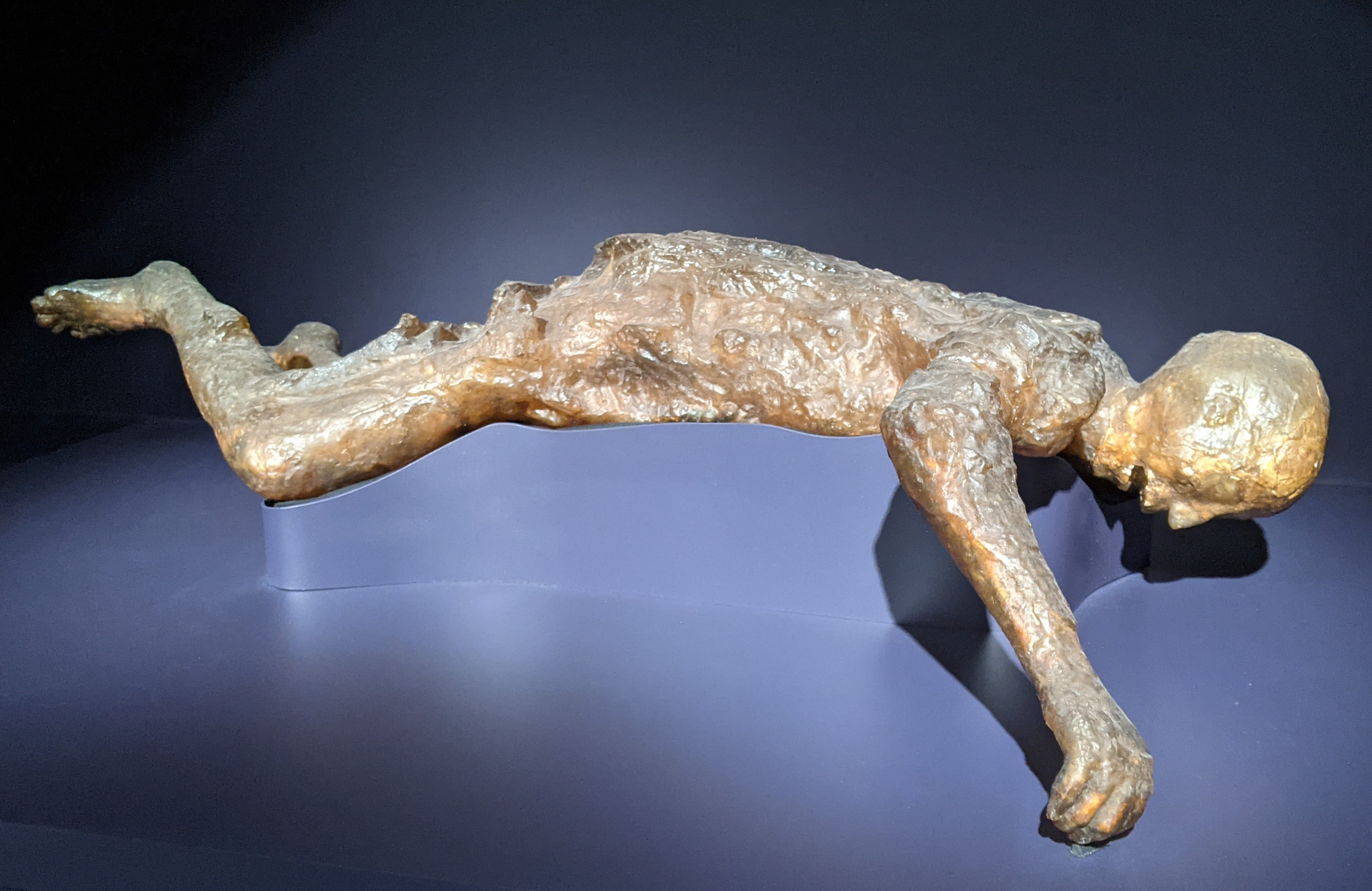
The Lady of Oplontis

A second villa, Villa B, was discovered in 1974, 300 metres (980 ft) east of Villa A, during the construction of a school and partially excavated until 1991.

In contrast to the sumptuously decorated Villa Poppaea, Villa B is smaller and is a rustic, two-storey structure with many rooms left unplastered and with tamped earth floors. The structure's plan reveals a central courtyard surrounded by a two-story peristyle of Nocera tufa columns. Nevertheless, more than seventy rooms were found on both ground and second-story levels. On the ground floor all four sides of the courtyard have barrel-vaulted rooms in opus incertum and opus reticulatum.

Some of the rooms seem to have been used for manufacturing and others were storerooms. These circumstances along with more than 400 amphorae recovered in the excavations indicate the property was devoted to the production of wine, oil, and agricultural goods. The discovery of a series of weights seems to confirm this; a bronze seal found at the site preserved the name of Lucius Crassius Tertius, apparently its last owner.

It was built at the end of the 2nd c. BC. The complex was part of a wider settlement built before the construction of neighbouring Villa A. On the south side of the courtyard eight barrel-vaulted storerooms were added after 50 BC, supporting well-decorated rooms above in the Fourth Style, facing the sea and opening onto a large portico, perhaps the owner's living quarters. There is also a rare example of a second style painting from the Republican era. A sophisticated water drainage system was also added. At the north of the site the ground floor rooms were reconfigured and the street repaved.

This villa was not deserted at the time of the eruption: the remains of 54 people were recovered in one of the rooms facing the sea, probably waiting to escape but perishing in the surge that hit Oplontis. They were split into two groups, one group at the front possessing fine jewellery, silverware, and coins whilst the other group at the back had none. Recent archaeology has shown that it suffered unique type of destruction because of its proximity to the sea, similar to the boathouses at Herculaneum. The volcanic eruption generated a pyroclastic flow that sped down the mountain toward Oplontis. The impact of the flow on the sea surface led to a type of "tsunami" which caused the violent entry and deposition of a water-heavy layer in the barrel-vaulted rooms (similar to the deposit that buried the skeletons on the shore of Herculaneum). The people sheltering at Oplontis died beneath a mixed mass of superheated gas, ash, and water. The impact of the wave probably also caused the collapse of the barrel-vaults.

The "lady of Oplontis" was discovered with a bronze jug (for water in those last hours), a purse and a small basket, containing coins and jewellery and near her stomach was a string of cheap blue pottery beads.

A rare very ornate strongbox was found in the peristyle, perhaps fallen from the upper floor, containing over 200 coins, jewellery, and a seal ring. It was finely decorated with inlay in silver, copper, and gilded bronze typical of late Hellenistic design, and had a complex locking system that was still used in the 19th century.

== Recent research ==
Since 2006 the Oplontis Project, led by the University of Texas at Austin, has carried out a systematic study of both villas. The project combined traditional excavation with 3D laser scanning and digital modelling to reconstruct the buildings and understand their architectural phases. At Villa A, three main construction periods were identified: a core from the mid-1st century BC, an Augustan expansion that added a private bath suite and aqueduct, and a later phase with a 60-metre swimming pool added after AD 45. The AD 62 Pompeii earthquake caused severe damage, and at the time of the eruption large sections of the villa were still undergoing repair.

At Villa B, the project clarified its role as a distribution centre for wine from the Vesuvian region. The storage capacity was estimated at more than 30,000 litres, and the variety of amphorae suggests both local export and import of wines. The excavations also revealed a sophisticated hydraulic infrastructure beneath the villa. The Oplontis Project’s findings have been published in multiple volumes and online resources, making the site one of the most thoroughly documented suburban settlements in the Vesuvius area.

== See also ==
- Archaeological sites in Naples
- List of Roman sites
