= Bourbon Tunnel =

Tunnel in Naples, Italy

Coordinates: 40.835400°N 14.24629°E

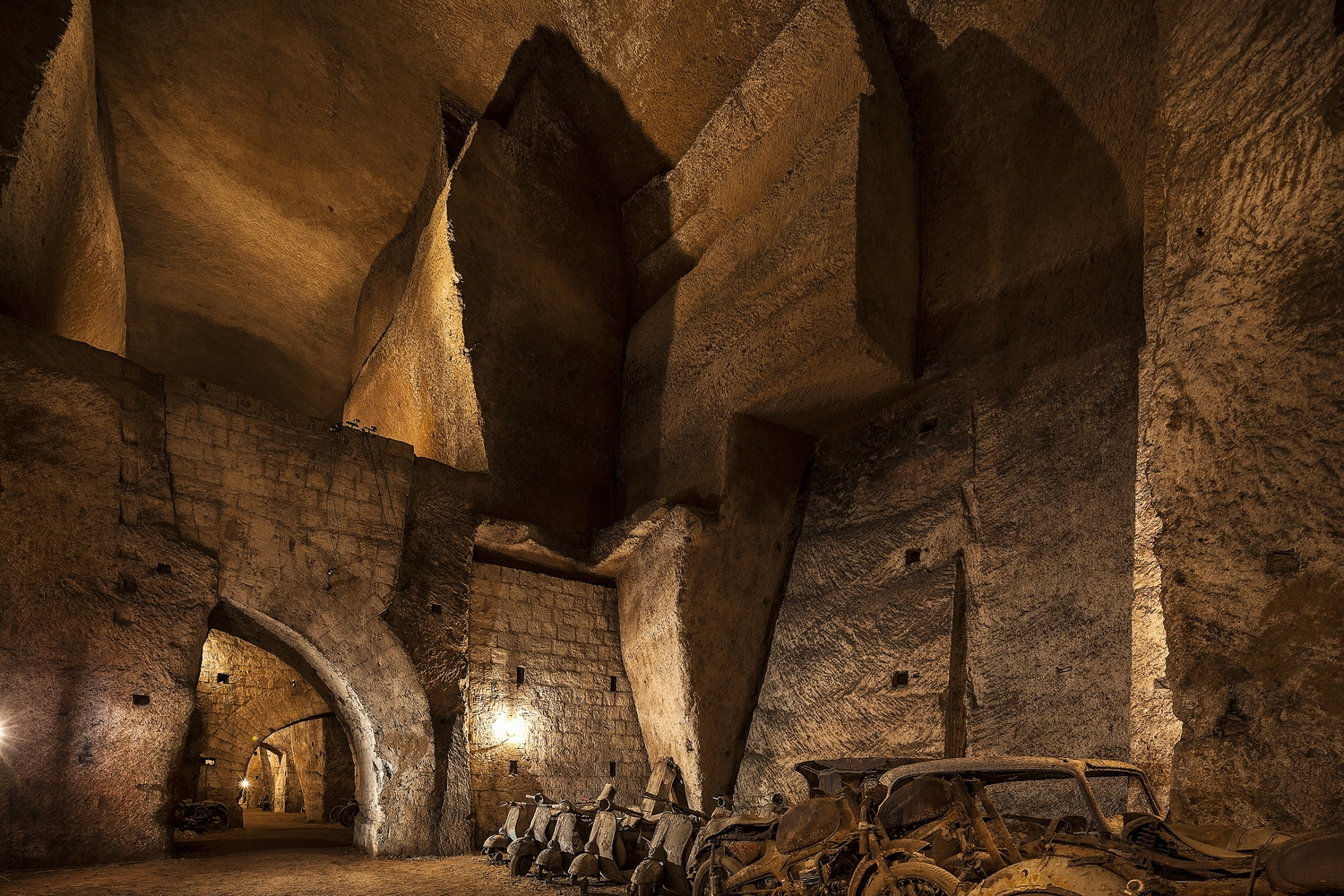
The tunnel

The Bourbon Tunnel, Tunnel Borbonico or Bourbon Gallery (Italian: Galleria Borbonica) is an ancient underground passage, constructed for military purposes to connect the Royal Palace to military barracks in Naples, Italy.

The monarchy in the era of King Ferdinand II of Bourbon was fearful of the revolution-prone populace of Naples. Errico Alvino was commissioned to construct a military passage for troops connecting the Royal Palace of Naples to Via Morelli, boring underneath the hill of Pizzofalcone and reaching the quartiere San Ferdinando, but also connecting to other tunnels and aqueducts, including the old Carmignano aqueduct (1627–1629).

The monarchy would also not have been ignorant that the Viceroy of Naples in 1647 had nearly been trapped in this urban Royal Palace, and only by luck was able to flee to a nearby convent to escape angry crowds during the Revolt of Masaniello, thus the tunnel could also serve as an escape route for its royal inhabitants.

Alvino envisioned a two-lane tunnel with two sidewalks on either side. The two outlets were to the west on Via della Pace (today's Via Morelli, also opened in 1853 by Alvino himself), just in front of the Caserma della Vittoria barracks, and to the east by today's Piazza Carolina, behind the basilica of San Francesco di Paola. The tunnel was to be called Galleria Reale, and both lanes were to take their royal appellations: the one leading to Chiaia was to be named Strada Regia while the one in the opposite direction Strada Regina.

Two years after it was begun, the fall of the Bourbon dynasty meant that construction came to a halt. During the Second World War, the tunnel was used as a shelter during bombardments. Presently the tunnels are open for tours, and share with Catacombs of Naples the urge to go underground, and with much of Neapolitan constructions, a kinship with decay and fruitless architecture in Naples. The tunnel contains decades of debris, including vintage cars and a discarded fascist monument that had been made for Aurelio Padovani.
