= Sant'Eframo Vecchio =

Church in Naples, Italy

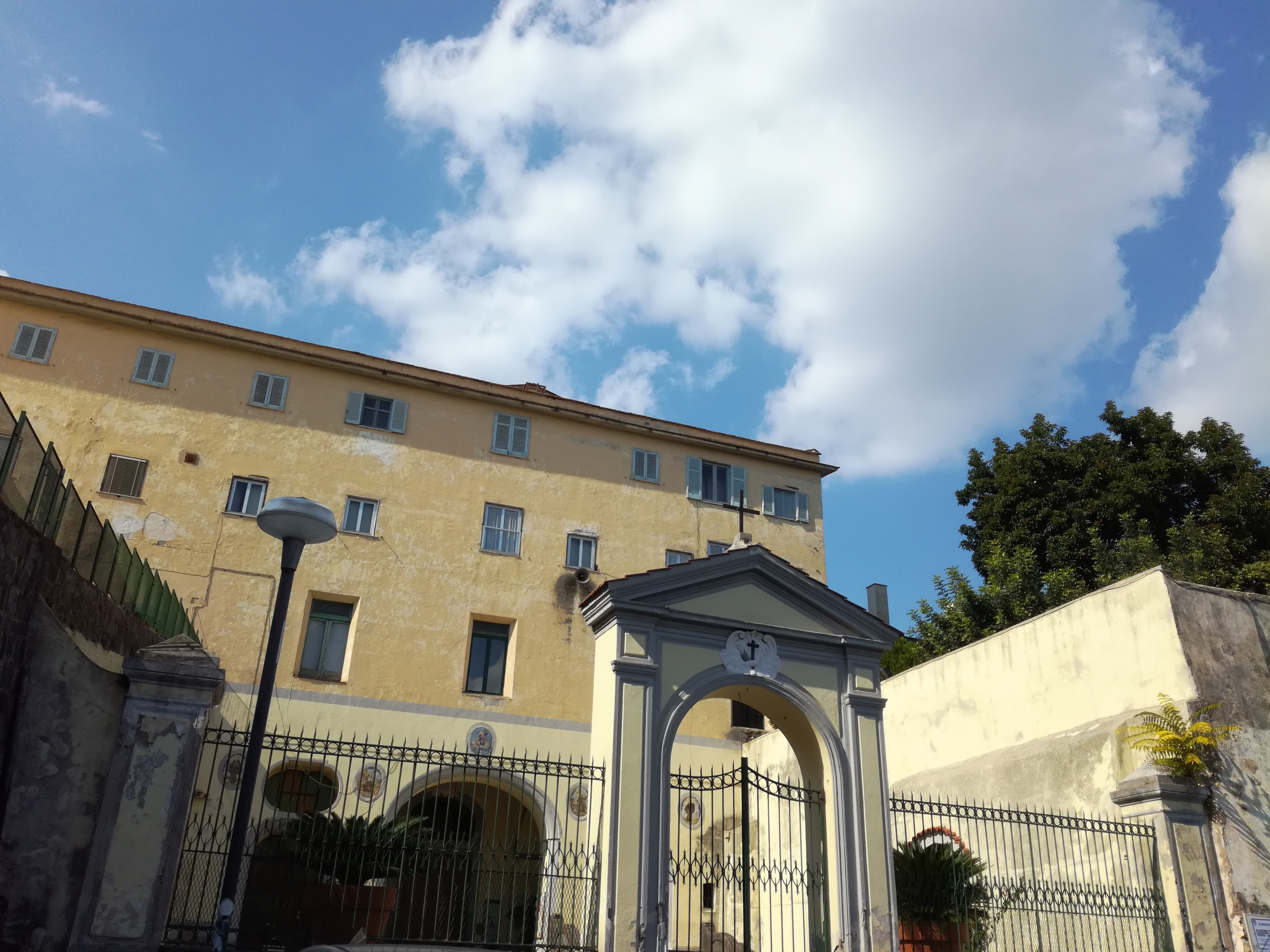
The friary

Sant'Eframo Vecchio is a church in the centre of Naples, Italy. It is said either to be on the burial site of saint Efrimus or on the site - either he was originally buried there in a 5th-century catacomb or his relics were translated there in the 13th century with those of Maximus of Naples and Fortunatus. There was a previous church on the site of unknown date, though the present structure was originally built in 1530 by the Capuchins. It has frequently been restored, such as the new maiolica facade of 1776 with five ovals by Tommaso Bruno. When the religious orders were suppressed after the Unification of Italy the Capuchins had to leave the church in 1865. The adjoining monastic buildings were acquired by the Monache delle Trentatré, who only returned them to the Capuchins in 1887.
