= San Biagio, Aversa =

Roman Catholic Church in Caserta, Italy

San Biagio is a Roman Catholic church and monastery in the municipality of Aversa, province of Caserta, in the region of Campania, southern Italy.

== History ==
Some sources attribute the founding of the monastery to a Norman princess, Aloara, but another claim is that it was founded in 1050 by Donna Riccarda, sister of Riccardo I, Prince of Capua and Count of Aversa. However the Codex of San Biagio from 1043 already mentions the monastery. It was built adjacent or within the walls of a moated castle. The monastery gave name to this Borgo of the ancient town, although remaining outside of the main walls until 1382. The Benedictine monastery was dependant to the Monastery of San Lorenzo Fuori Le Mura

Over the centuries the rule and structure of the monastery changed. It became a site of local pilgrimage, and for example was visited in 1734 by the Bourbon Charles IV of Naples. In 1806, the monastery was suppressed. Over the years since the monastery has been used as a jail, barracks, school and other functions. It kept a diminished house of worship housing a small number of nuns, who from 1932 to 1954, were under the leadership of the abbess Maria Concetta De Pietro. The structures suffered much damage during the second world war. On August 20, 1943, the paintings of Malinconico and Caracciolo, were destroyed by an allied bombardment. Further damage occurred during an earthquake of 1980.

The cloister was originally romanesque and rebuilt in a baroque style. Of the church, the pronaos still remains with Two 18th-century stucco medallions depicting Saints Benedetto and Biagio. The church contains 18 canvases depicting the Life of St Benedict painted (1701) by Pietro Martino. The counterfacade has five canvases by Giovanni Battista Lama, depicting: St Phillip baptizes a Eunuch, St Catherine of Alexandria, St Benedict of Norsia and Santa Scholastica, and Santa Dorotea and St Ambrosius and St Theodosius. Both Martino and Lama were pupils of Luca Giordano. The Maiolica pavement dates to the early 18th century.

The chapels on the right (back to front) also contain original artworks:

- 1st chapel: Adoration of the Magy (16th century) by Fabrizio Santafede
- 2nd chapel: St Peter freed by the Angel
- 3rd chapel: Adoration by the Shepherds (1767) by Andrea Starace
- 4th chapel: 15th century wooden crucifix
- 4th & 5th chapels: contain elements of the organ and an 18th-century wooden choir
- 5th chapel: Assumption of the Virgin with Saints Secondino & Phillip Neri by Andrea Vaccaro (1604 - 1670), pupil of Girolamo Imparato.

The sacristy houses a St Cajetan (XVII sec.), attributed to Agostino Beltrano, and an Incredulity of St Thomas(16th century). The main altar, which shows the influence of Vanvitelli with marbles by Paolo Persico, houses an altarpiece depicting a Martyrdom of San Biagio (1588) once attributed to Marco da Siena but more likely to later to Giovanni Battista Graziano, a local painter.

The chapels on the right (front to back) also contain original artworks:

- 6th chapel: San Benedict with the Rule-book, corvus, and the Abbey of Montecassino in background (late 16th century) by Giovanni Vincenzo Forli
- 7th chapel of SS. Mauro e Placido:San Mauro benedisce gli storpi by Giovanni Battista Lama
- 8th chapel of St Blaise: richly decorated with polychrome marble decoration, wooden 16th century statue of San Biagio and Life of the Saint in 18th-century frescoes
- 9th chapel: Deposition of Christ, in Flemish style. (fine '500);
- 10th chapel: Madonna del Rosario (1623)
- 11th chapel: Pentecost (late 16th century), attributed to either Marco Pino da Siena or Giovanni Battista Graziano

== Sources ==
- Aversa Nostre Radici, website describing the church.
