= Diana de Rosa =

Italian painter

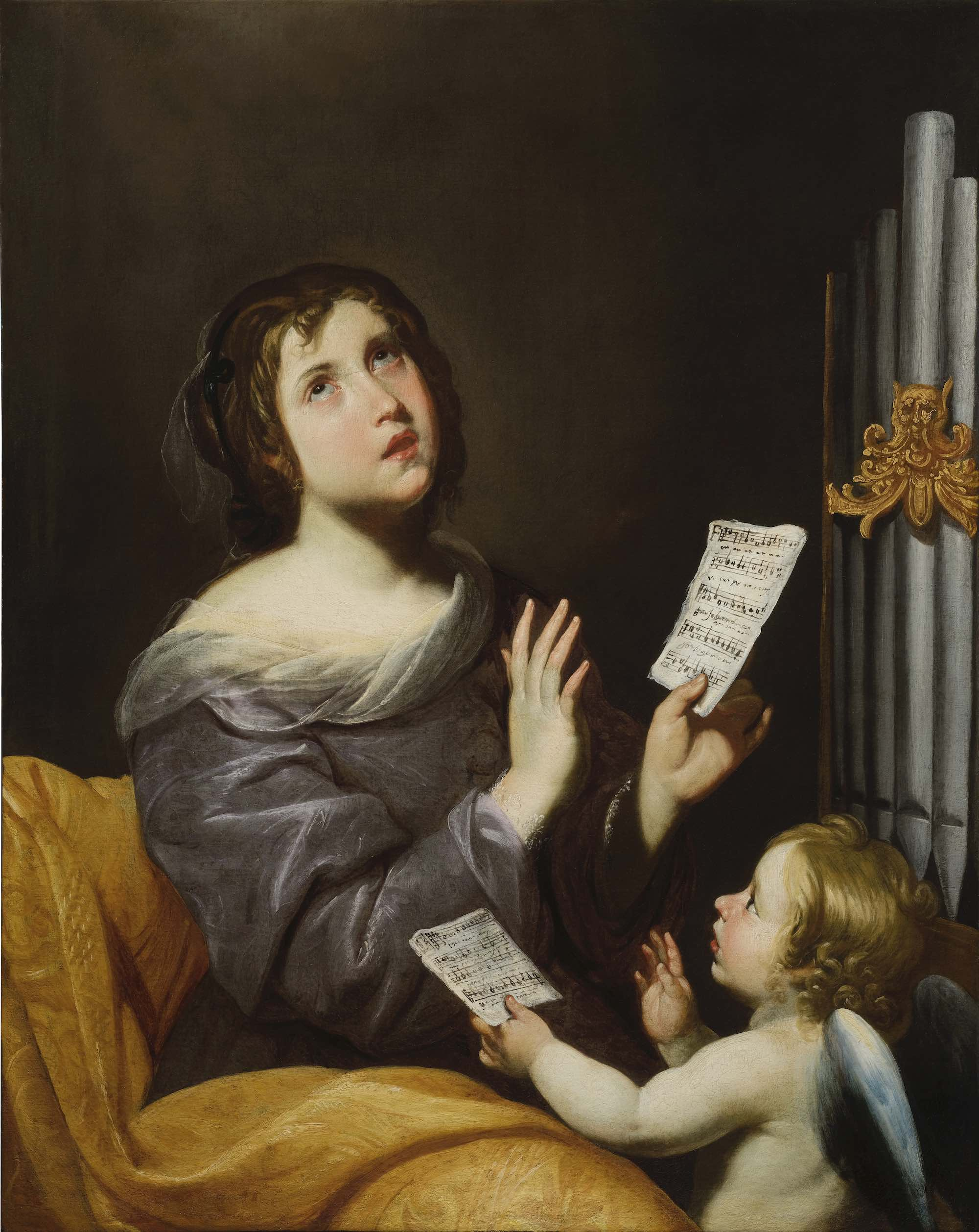
Saint Cecilia with an Angel, oil on canvas, Museum of Fine Arts, Boston

Diana de Rosa (1602–1643), also known as Annella de Rosa, Annella di Massimo, Anniella di Rosa, or Aniella di Beltrano, was a seventeenth-century Neapolitan painter.

== Early life ==
Diana was born in Naples in 1602 to Caterina de Mauro and the painter Tommaso de Rosa. Tommaso died in 1610 and Caterina remarried in 1612 to another painter, Filippo Vitale. Some sources claim that Diana first learned to draw from her uncle, Pacecco, while others argue that Pacecco was actually Diana's brother, and both siblings learned to draw under the instruction of their stepfather, Filippo Vitale. When Diana displayed artistic promise, she joined the workshop of Cavalier Massimo Stanzione. In 1626, Diana married Agostino Beltrano, who also trained with Stanzione.

Under the instruction of Stanzione, Diana painted many works. According to the biographer Bernardo de Dominici, who wrote an account of Diana's life, she would paint the commissioned work according to Stanzione's preliminary drawings, then Stanzione would retouch them before they were delivered to the patron.

== Known works ==
According to de Dominici's account of Diana's life, Diana was not content painting only for private households and wanted her work to be public to make it known that women could attain excellence in art. Therefore, Stanzione provided her with a commission at the church of the Pietà de’ Turchini where she painted an image of the Birth of the Virgin on the ceiling near the entrance of the church, and the Death of the Virgin on the ceiling towards the high altar. According to de Dominici those images were so beautiful that people believed her teacher Stanzione had painted them. The paintings in the Pietà de’ Turchini were most likely destroyed in 1638 when the church roof collapsed. For the Royal Church of Monte Oliveto in Naples, Diana painted an image depicting the Madonna breastfeeding the infant Christ, while for the sacristy of Santa Maria degli Angeli, she painted an image of Saint John the Baptist with a lamb. Unfortunately, both of those works no longer exist. A possible posthumous portrait of Diana by Andrea Vaccaro (c. 1660) can be found in a Neapolitan private collection.

== Death ==
The exact cause of Diana's death is a matter of dispute. In de Dominici's account of Diana's life, he claims her husband murdered her in a jealous rage after a servant girl incorrectly informed him that Diana was having an affair with her instructor. However, other scholars claim de Dominici's account was over-dramatized and that Diana died of illness in 1643.

== Bibliography ==
- De Dominici, Bernardo. Vite de’ pittori, scultori, ed architetti napoletani. Vol. 3 (Napoli 1742), 96–100.
- Catello, Angela. “De Rosa, Diana.” DBI. Vol. 39 (1991). 163–5.
- Dabbs, Julia. Life Stories of Women Artists, 1550-1800: An Anthology. Surrey, England: Ashgate Publishing, 2009. 239–48.
