= Gianfranco Folena =

Italian linguist and philologist

- Born: 9 April 1920 Savigliano, Italy
- Died: 14 February 1992 (aged 71) Padua
- Occupation: Author, linguist, philologist, academic

Gianfranco Folena (9 April 1920 – 14 February 1992) was an Italian linguist, philologist, and academic.

== Biography ==
Born in Savigliano in Piedmont in 1920, from a Tuscan family. He attended the Scuola Normale Superiore in Pisa along with Giorgio Pasquali. After his involvement in the war and imprisonment in India, he graduated in Florence, with Bruno Migliorini. He held the chair of Romance Philology and then of History of the Italian Language at the University of Padua until the end of his teaching activity in 1990.

Member of Italian and foreign Academies – Accademia dei Lincei, Accademia della Crusca, Bayerische Akademie der Wissenschaften ( Bavarian Academy of Sciences ) – he directed the Institute for Letters, Music and Theater of the Giorgio Cini Foundation in Venice from the beginning. He founded the Philological-Linguistic Circle of Padua, which has organized a long series, well-known and renowned throughout the world, of seminars and conferences on linguistics and philology in Bressanone.

He was director of the series "Writers of Italy", of the Laterza publisher, and of "Quaderni del Circolo philologico-linguistico Padovano", as well as of the magazines "Quaderni di rhetoric and poetics" and "Filologia veneta"; he was also co-director of the historical journal of Italian literature, Lingua nostra and Medioevo novel.

Winner of the Feltrinelli Prize in 1972, then in 1983 he won the Viareggio Prize for non- fiction with the volume L'Italiano in Europa. Author of a vast production that spans various fields, he published several essays and volumes. Of his work as a philologist remains, among other critical editions, that of Piovano Arlotto's Mottos and jokes (Milan-Naples, Ricciardi, 1953). In 1967, he was the first president of the Italian Linguistic Society.

In 2014, the Municipality of Padua dedicated to him the square in front of Palazzo Maldura, seat of the Institute of Neolatine Philology (now the Department of Linguistic and Literary Studies), which for many years was the place of his teaching.

Mibact has established a National Committee for the celebrations of the centenary of the birth in 2020, which will continue its activities in 2021 and 2022. The committee is chaired by the President of the Accademia della Crusca, prof. Claudio Marazzini.

== Personal life ==
Folena married the French artist Elisabeth Marcilhacy, painter and poet, from whom their four children were born: Lucia, the university professor of English literature at the University of Turin; Andrea, a mathematician who died in France at a young age; Eleonora, professor of mathematics of the middle schools of Padua; and the youngest son Pietro Folena, for years deputy of the Republic and cultural entrepreneur. Left a widower, Gianfranco Folena married in 1989 Daniela Goldin, full professor of Medieval Humanistic Philology and History of Melodrama at the University of Padua.

== Main work ==
- L'italiano in Europa, Torino, Einaudi, 1983
- Culture e lingue nel Veneto medievale, Padova, Editoriale Programma, 1990
- Volgarizzare e tradurre, Torino, Einaudi, 1991
- Il linguaggio del caos, Torino, Bollati Boringhieri, 1991
- Dizionario della lingua italiana Palazzi-Folena (in collaborazione con Fernando Palazzi), Torino, Loescher, 1992
- Filologia e umanità, Vicenza, Neri Pozza, 1993
- Vocabolario del veneziano di Carlo Goldoni (a cura di Patrizia Borghesan e Daniela Sacco), Roma, Istituto della Enciclopedia Italiana, 1993
- Scrittori e scritture, Bologna, Il Mulino, 1997
- Textus testis: lingua e cultura poetica delle origini, Torino, Bollati Boringhieri, 2002

== Bibliography ==
- Studi di filologia romanza e italiana offerti a Gianfranco Folena dagli allievi padovani, Modena, Mucchi, 1980
- Omaggio a Gianfranco Folena, 3 voll., Padova, Editoriale Programma, 1993
- Studi sulla lingua della letteratura musicale in onore di Gianfranco Folena, Firenze, Olschki, 1994
- Studi sul lessico della letteratura critica del teatro musicale in onore di Gianfranco Folena, Firenze, Olschki, 1995
- Plurilinguismo e letteratura, XXVIII Convegno interuniversitario in memoria di Gianfranco Folena, Bressanone/Brixen, 6–9 luglio 2000
- Accademia dei Lincei. Giornata di studio in ricordo di Gianfranco Folena, 18 giugno 2002
