= Catacombs of Saint Gaudiosus =

Roman catacomb in Naples, Italy

Coordinates: 40.8595°N 14.2490°E

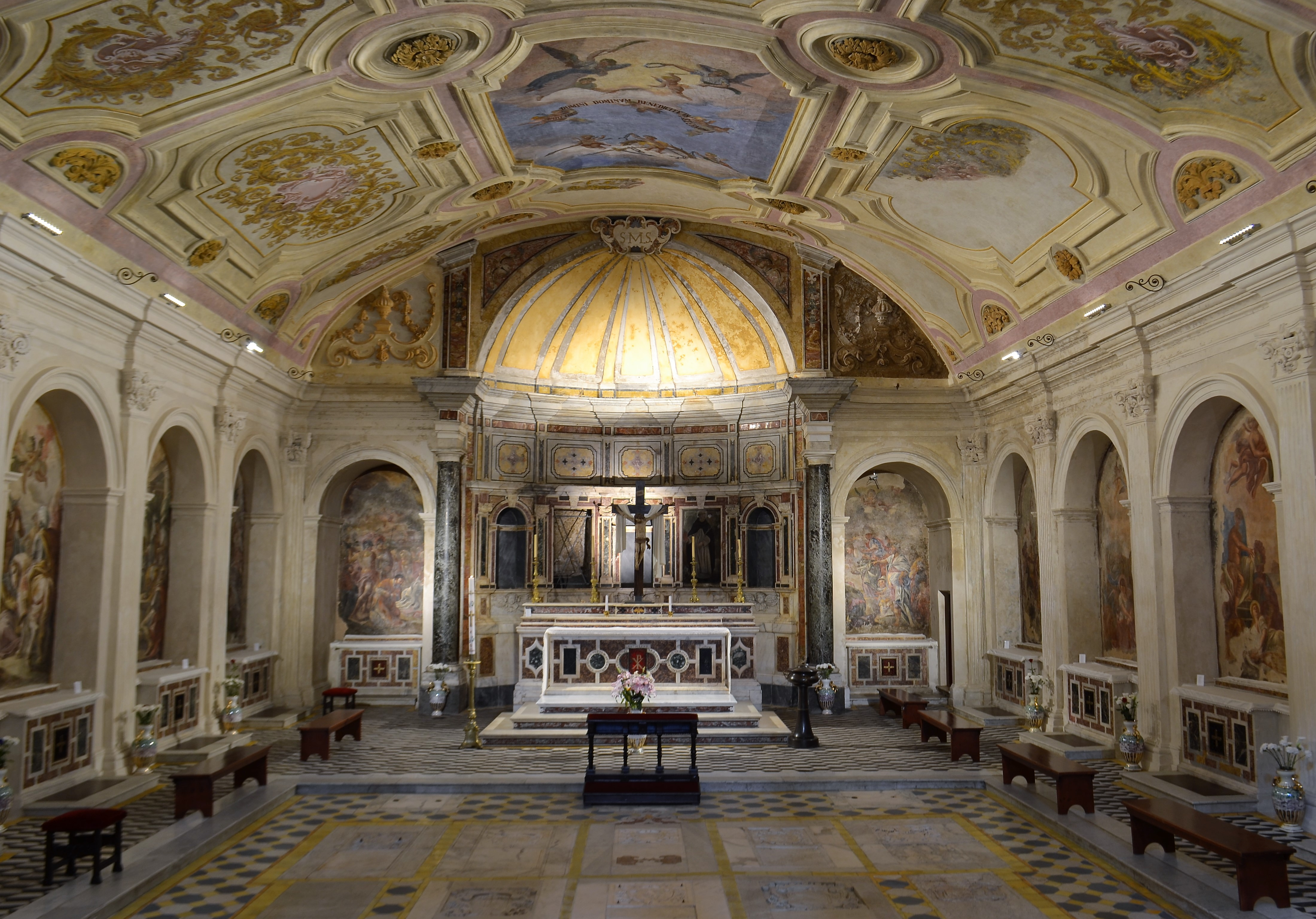
Main crypt below the main altar of the church of Santa Maria della Sanità.

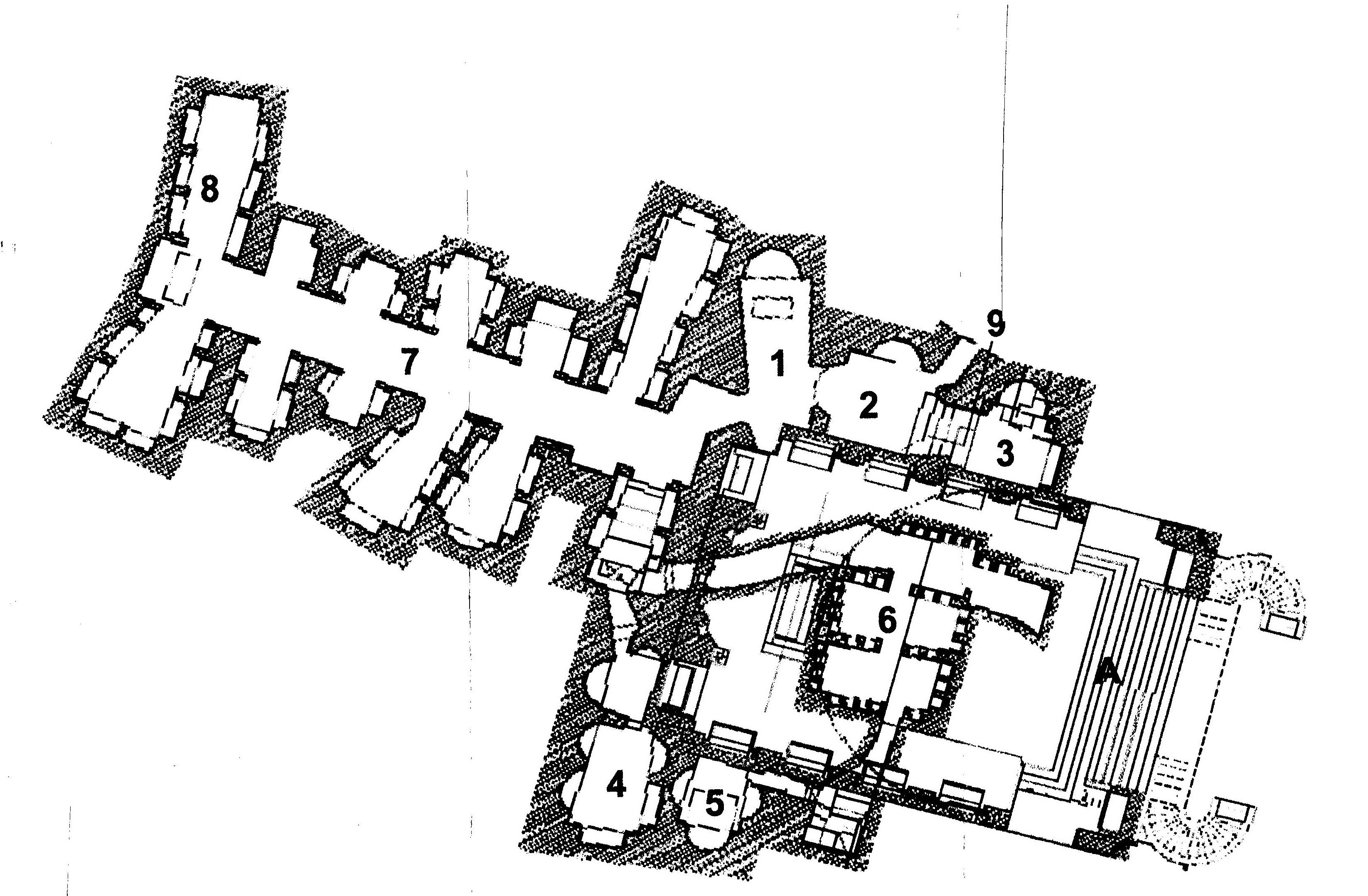
Map of San Gaudioso catacomb

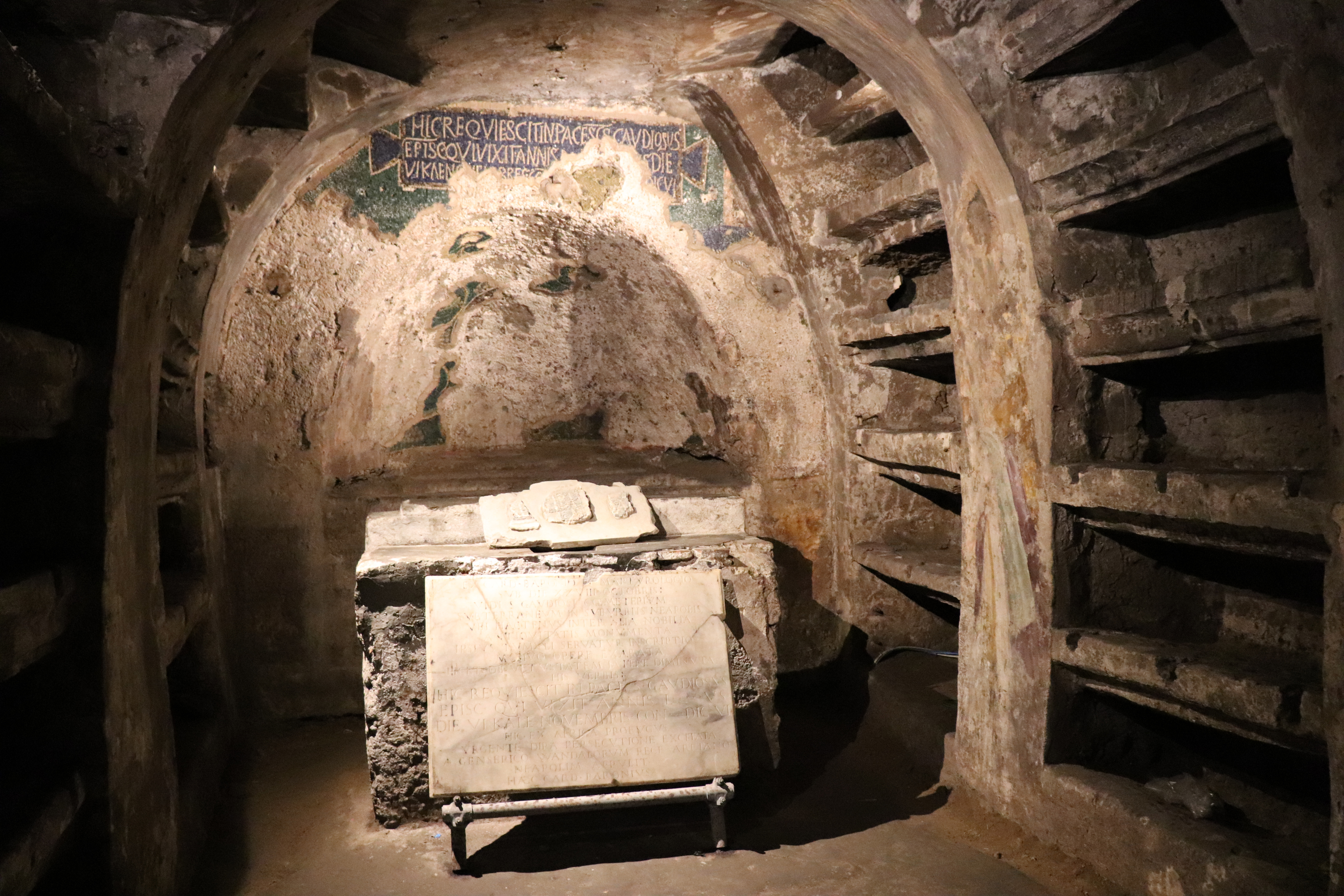
Tomb of St. Gaudiosus (#1)

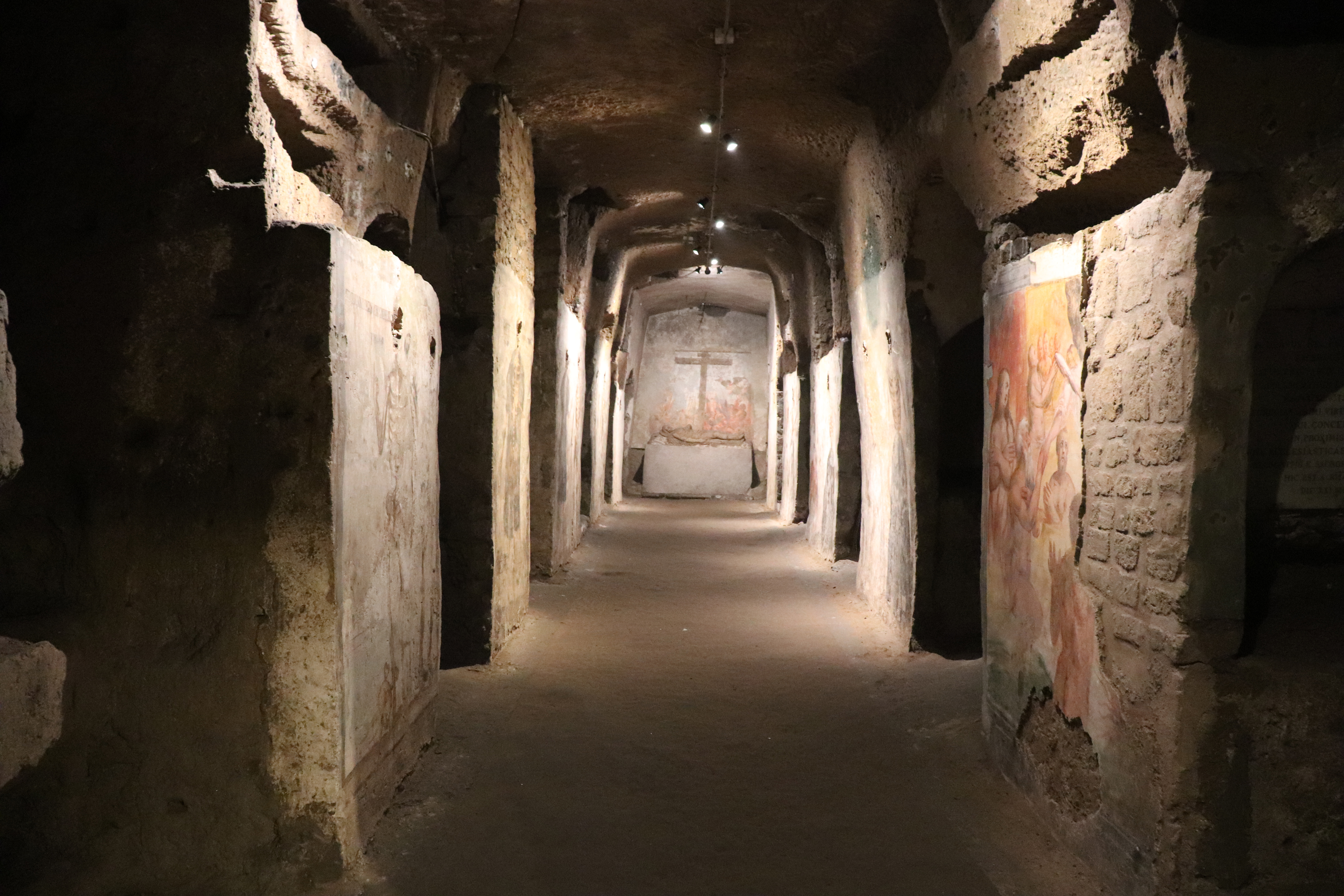
Hall with 17th century burials (#7)

The Catacombs of Saint Gaudiosus are underground paleo-Christian burial sites (4th–5th century AD), located in the northern area of the city of Naples (now Stella district).

== History ==
The catacombs were probably occupied on a pre-existing Greek-Roman necropolis in the district known nowadays as Rione Sanità, that was uninhabited at that time. According to tradition, it was the burial site of St Gaudiosus, a bishop arrived in Naples from North Africa, due to a shipwreck.

His burial took place between 451 and 453 and the place, although was already the tomb of another bishop, St Nostriano, became an object of veneration.

The entire area of Rione Sanità was uninhabited throughout the Middle Ages because of the numerous mudslides from the hill of Capodimonte which buried the area. The urbanisation of Rione Sanità began only around the sixteenth century and the catacombs returned to their original burial function. During the seventeenth century, with the construction of the basilica of Santa Maria della Sanità just above the ancient church or chapel of St Gaudioso, the underground cemetery was "modernized" with profound changes in its original structure and the destruction of some of it.

After the outbreak of plague in 1656, the vast limestone caves in the valley became a huge open-air graveyard, and in the early 19th-century at the time of Joachim Murat, numerous bones from the "mummification rooms" were moved as well as later to make space for victims of other epidemics, such as cholera of 1836.

Nowadays, only a small portion remains of the original catacombs.

== Description ==
Access to the catacombs is in the crypt, under the raised presbytery of the church of Santa Maria della Sanità. Her depiction is represented in a faint paleochristian fresco detached by a wall of the old church, due to a mud slide.

The icon of the Lady of Health (Santa Maria della Sanità) venerated since the 5th – 6th century, is the most ancient Marian icon in Naples, is now kept in the first right side chapel of the basilica. Many inhabitants of the neighborhood, however, believe that the church is dedicated to St. Vincent Ferrer, because of the popular devotion to this holy Dominican and of the beautiful wooden statue of him, placed at the left of the altar.

The crypt, once a long corridor catacomb, clearly contains on the vault and on the walls, visible frescoes by Bernardino Fera representing stories of martyrs. The arcosolium, placed at the entrance, guards the Tomb of San Gaudioso, with a sixth-century mosaic decoration.

In the various cubicles that open along the arms of the catacombs, were located 5th – 6th century frescoes (St. Peter, among others, and San Sossio, deacon of Pozzuoli) and a mosaic dating before the late 5th century. The tufa sculpture of the dead Christ to the left of the entrance dates back at the end of the 17th century. The 17th century was for the catacombs a new period of use, especially by the Dominican friars. In this era it was, in fact, still widespread the use of the drainers: stone cavities in which corpse were leaned into a fetal position, to make them lose the fluids.

The Dominican friars thought that the head was the most important part of the body as the seat of thoughts; that way, after drying, the heads were preserved, while the rest of the body was amassed in the charnel house.

During this period was also exercised a macabre practice to take the heads of the now dried corpses and lock them in the walls and painting below a body that would give some indication of the profession of the deceased. This type of burial was reserved for the wealthy classes and was later abandoned due to hygienic reasons.

Among those who received such burials were:

- Donna Sveva Gesualda (1611) – princess of Montesarchio, mother of Maria d'Avalos
- Lady Carancicia della Cerenzia (1618)
- Captain Scipione Brancaccio (c. 1622) – baron of Alfano, Spanish army officer; fought at the Battle of White Mountain
- Marco Antonio d'Aponte (also spelled de Ponte) (1624) – marquis of Sant'Angelo, president/judge of the Royal Council, member of the Council of Italy
- Giovanni Balducci (c. 1630) – painter
- Diego Longobardo (1632) – magistrate
- Alessandro d'Afflitto (1635)
- Maria de Ponte – noblewoman
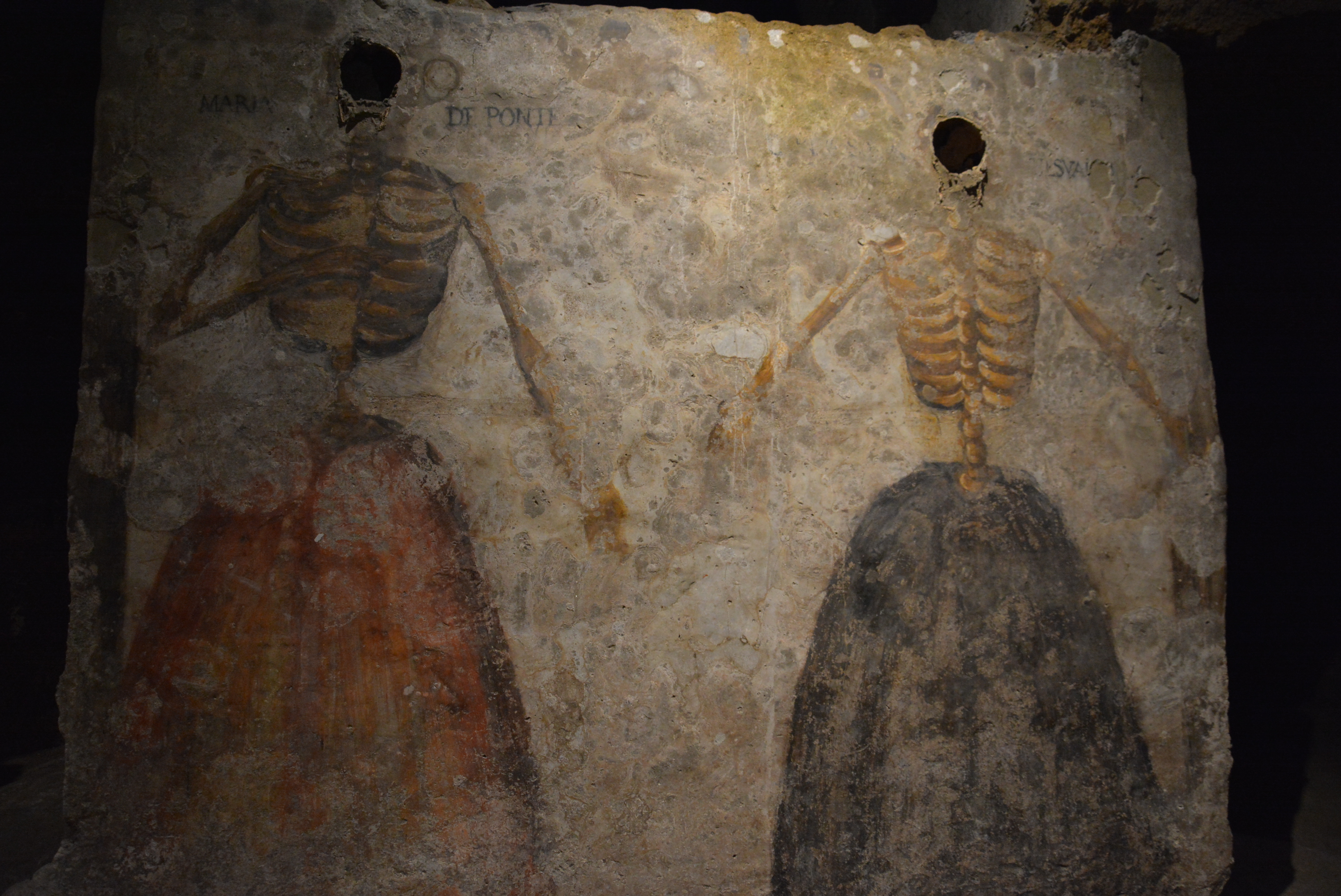
Maria de Ponte (left) and Sveva Gesualda, 1611 (right)

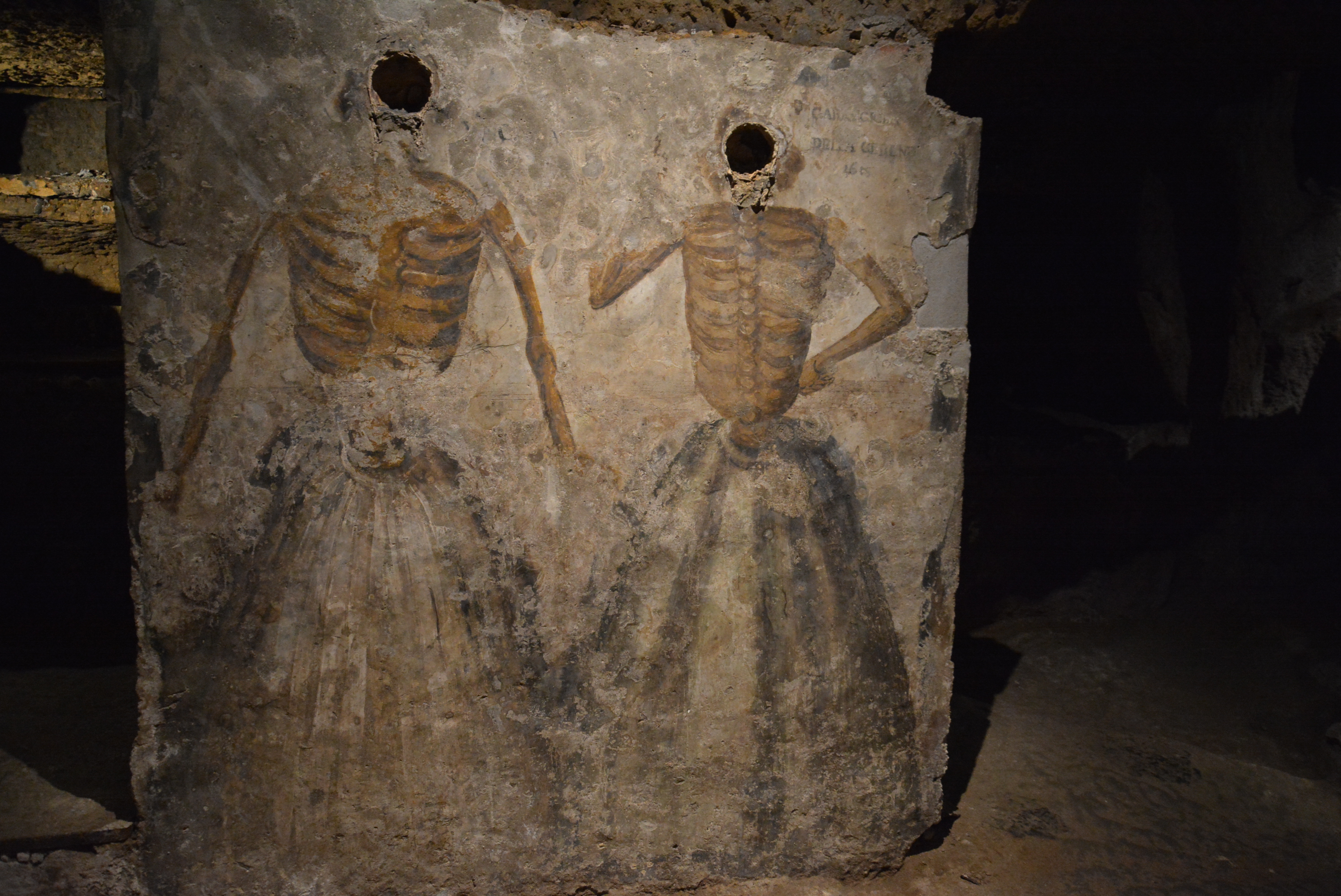
Unknown woman (left) and Carancicia della Cerenzia, 1618 (right)

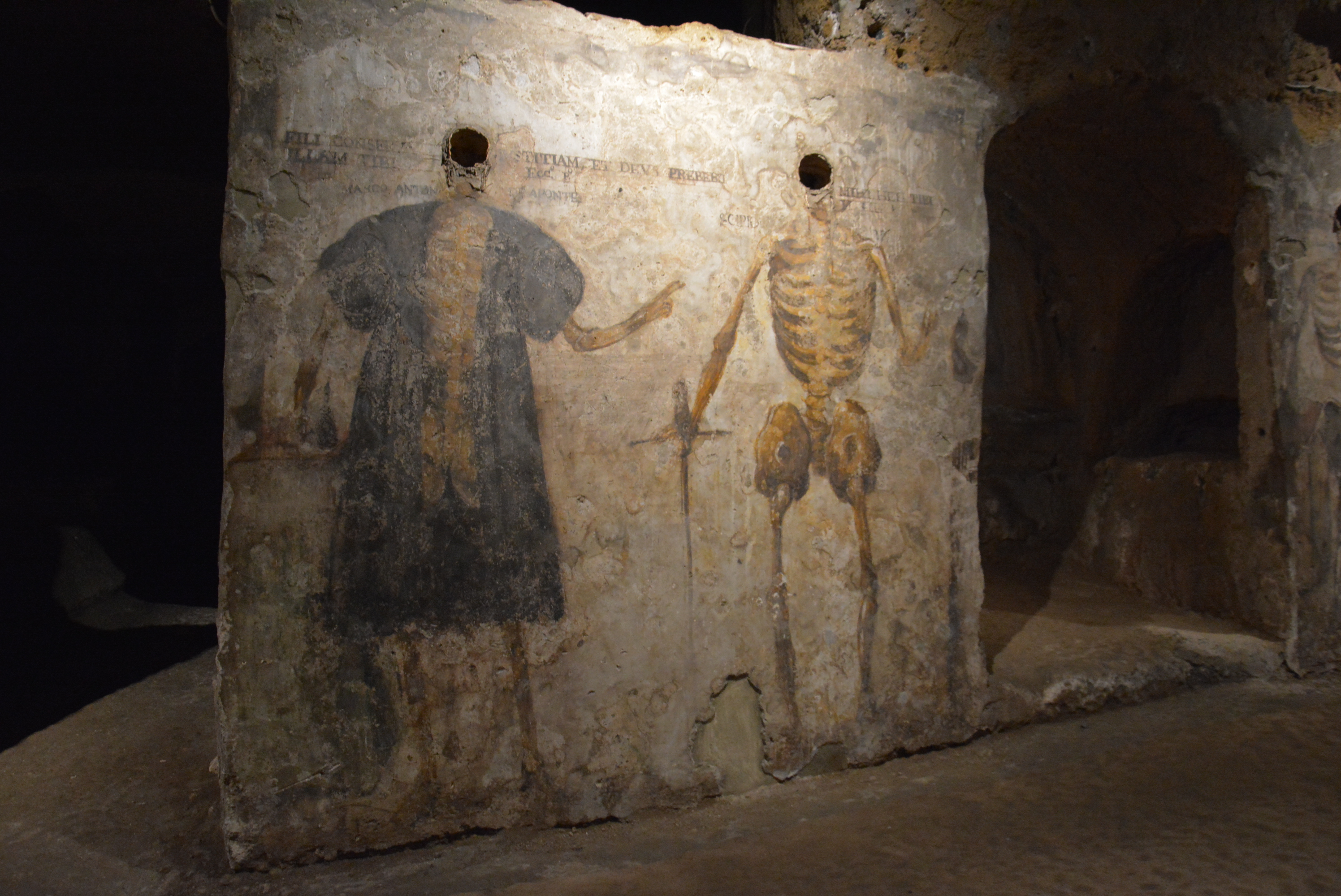
Marco Antonio d'Aponte, 1624, (left) and Scipione Brancaccio, c. 1622 (right)

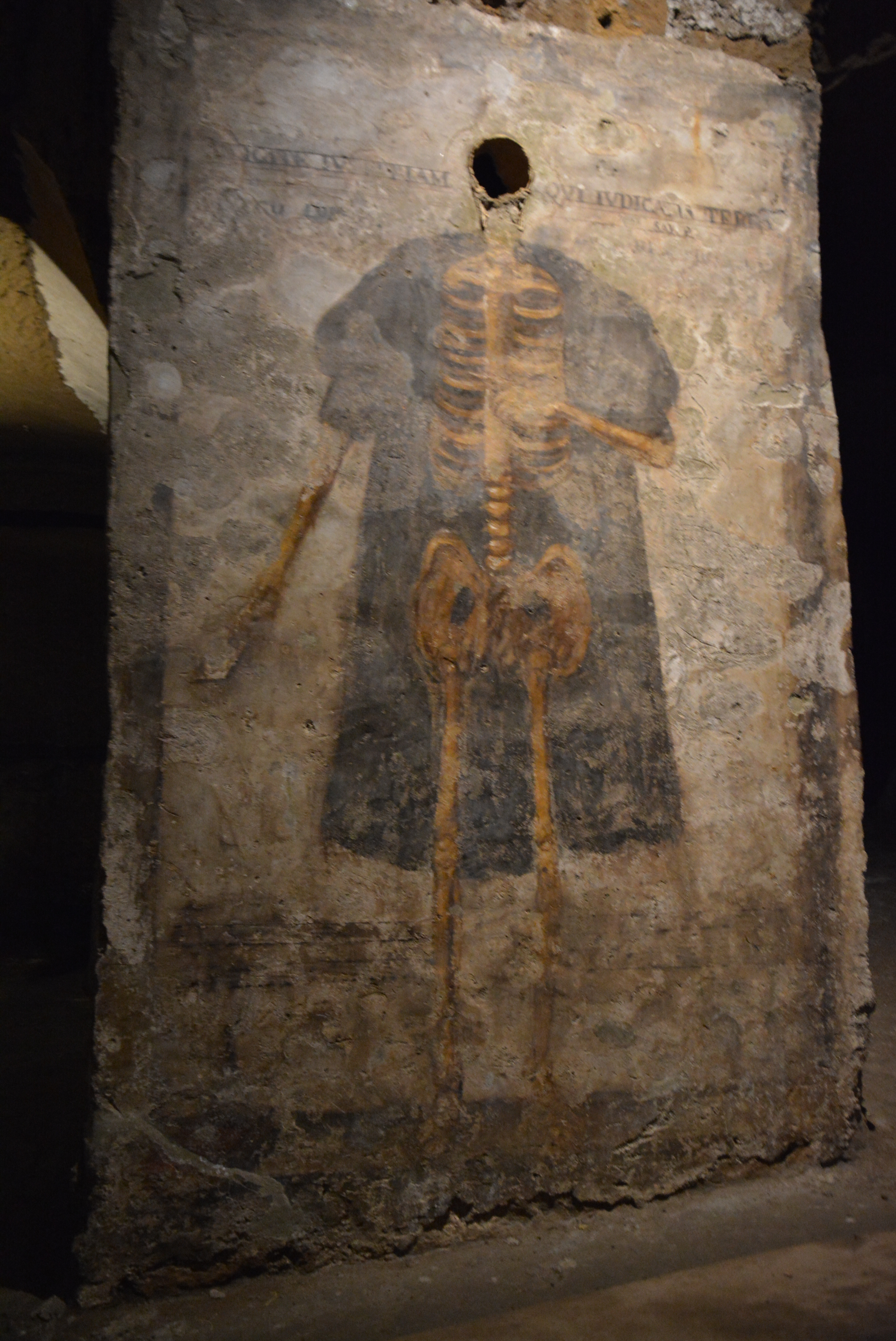
Diego Longobardo, 1632

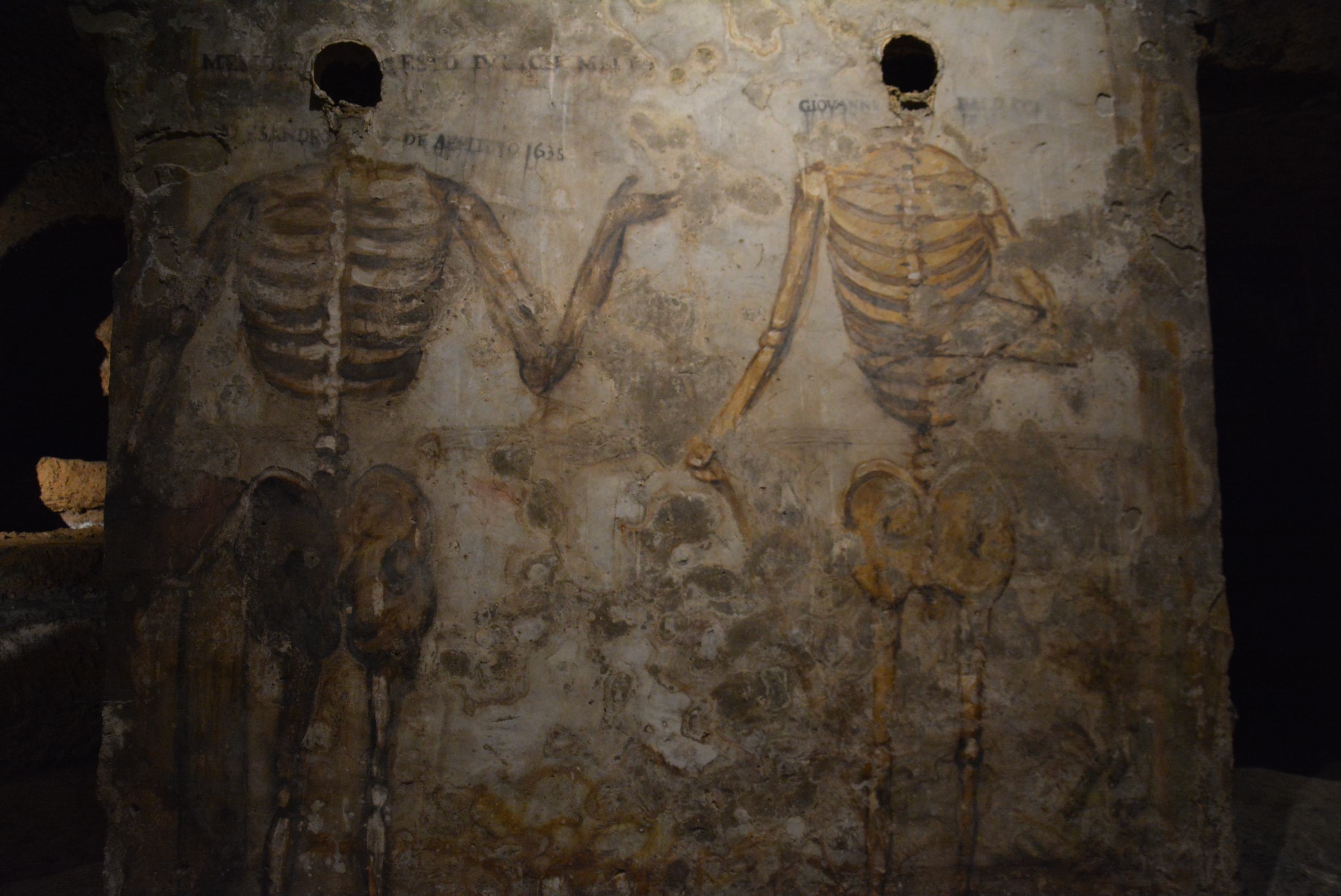
Alessandro d'Afflitto, 1635, (left) and Giovanni Balducci, c. 1630 (right)

The burial practice was banned in 1637 due to concerns over the condition of the catacombs.

== Curiosities ==
The dead were buried in small openings in the walls, but now only the skulls survived, due to the fact that the surface had been deteriorated by the humidity. Most of that skullcaps are smaller than modern human ones, maybe because of the different nutrition and the healthier way of life.

The Neapolitan actor Antonio De Curtis, known as Totò, was a native of the Rione Sanità and he was used to frequent its catacombs, where there is a fresco representing the victory of Death. This image has probably inspired Toto's poem “A’ livella”.

By the late twentieth century, the Dominican cloister adjacent to the Basilica, had become an inn that sponsors visits to the catacombs of San Gaudioso and San Gennaro. To see even the part illuminated not by the lights, during the visit, it is advisable to bring a flashlight.

== See also ==
- Catacombs of San Gennaro
- Bourbon Tunnel
- Crypta Neapolitana
- Catacombs of Rome

== Bibliography ==
- (2001). Guida d'Italia, Napoli e dintorni. Milano: Touring Club Italiano, (6ª ed.). ISBN 8836519547
- Avilio, Carlo (2009). "La catacomba di San Gaudioso. Le radici sotterranee della cristianità disegnano nuove prospettive per il quartiere della Sanità", in Varriale Roberta (curated by), I sottosuoli napoletani, pp. 91–101. ISBN 978-8880801030.
