= Santa Maria della Sanità, Naples =

Basilica in Naples

Basilica of Santa Maria della Sanità Basilica di Santa Maria della Sanità (in Italian)
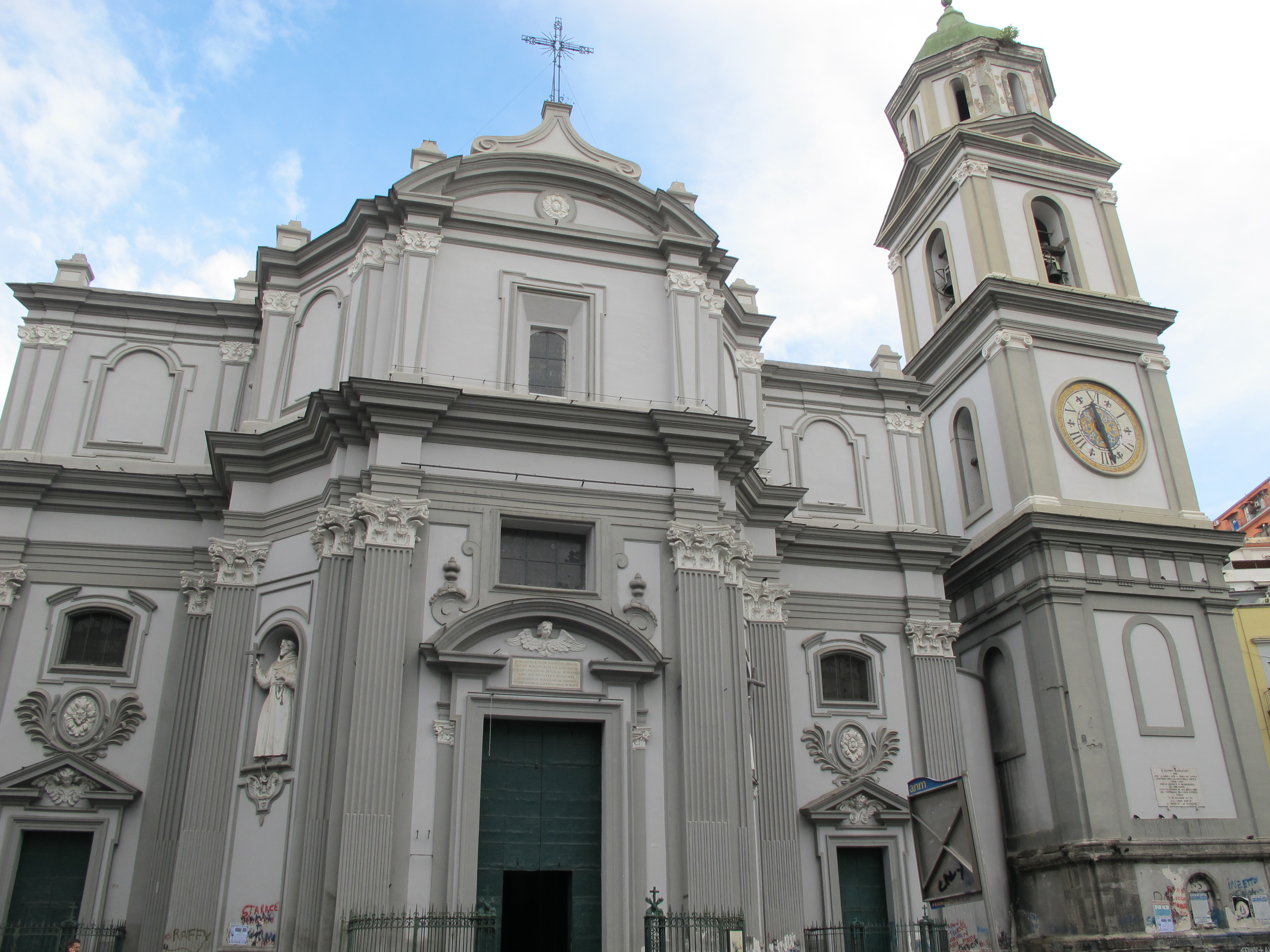
- Façade of Santa Maria della Sanità.

Religion
- Affiliation: Roman Catholic
- Diocese: Archdiocese of Naples
- Ecclesiastical or organizational status: Minor basilica

Location
- Location: Naples, Campania, Italy
- Interactive map of Basilica of Santa Maria della Sanità; Basilica di Santa Maria della Sanità (in Italian)
- Coordinates: 40.8597°N 14.2490°E

Architecture
- Type: Church

The Basilica of Santa Maria della Sanità is a basilica church located over the Catacombs of San Gaudioso, on a Piazza near where Via Sanità meets Via Teresa degli Scalzi, in the Rione of the Sanità, in Naples, Italy. The church is also called San Vincenzo or San Vincenzo della Sanità, due to the cult of an icon of San Vincenzo Ferrer, also called locally O' Monacone (the big monk).

== History ==
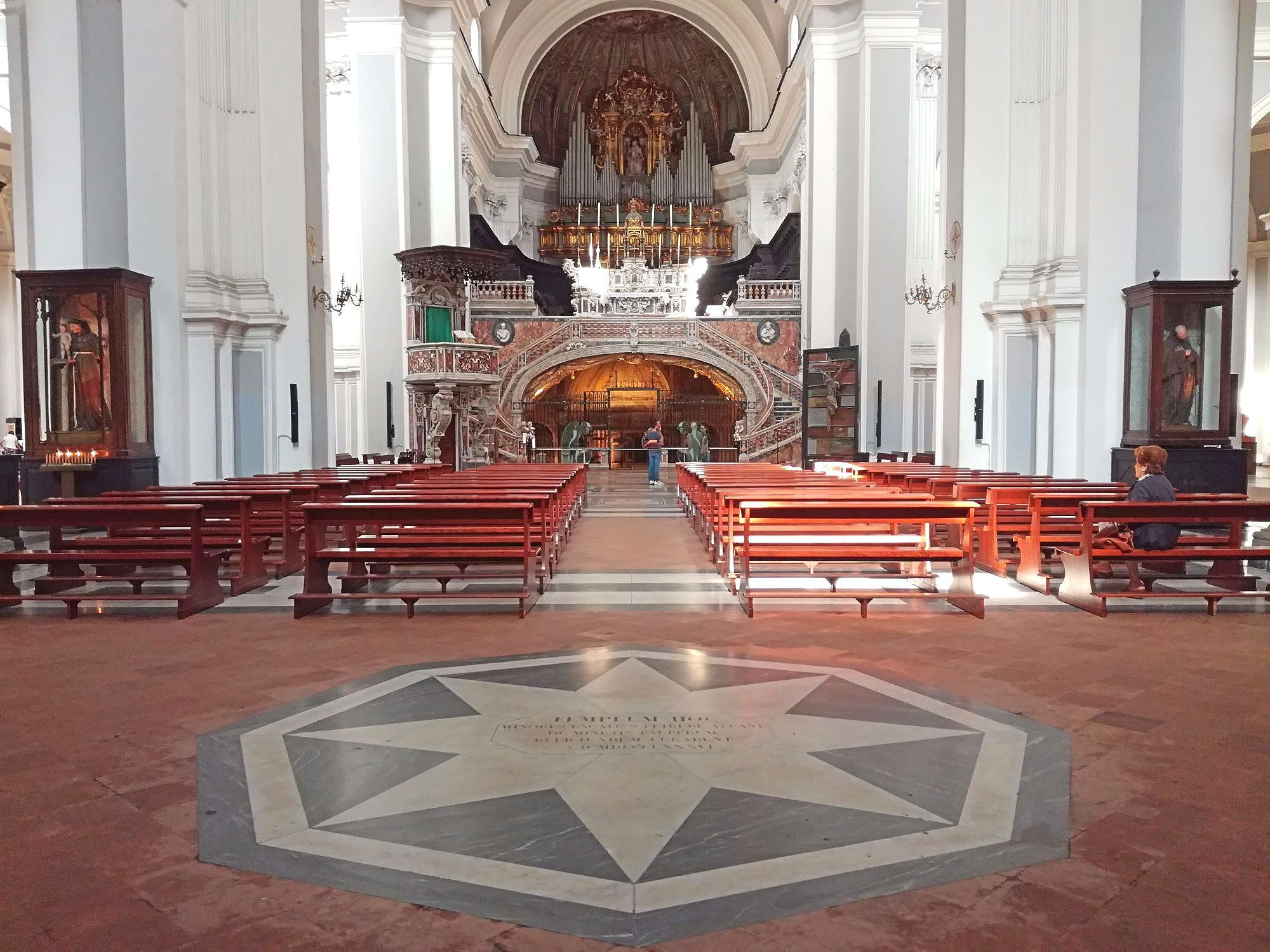
Nave looking towards altar and crypt

The church was originally attached to a Dominican monastery founded in 1577. The church was built in a centralized Greek-cross plan from 1602 to 1613 using the architectural designs of Giuseppe Nuvolo.

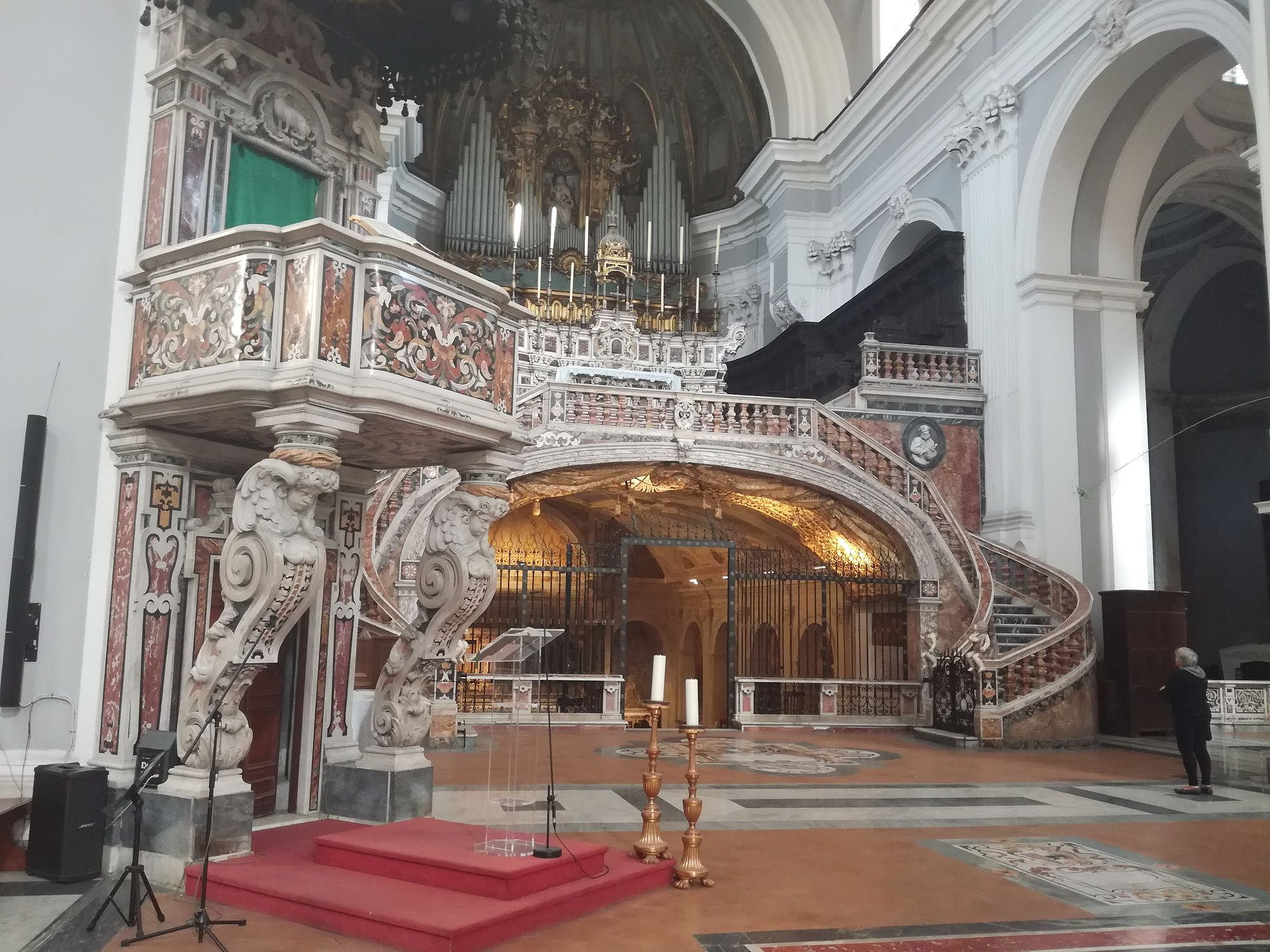
Main altar, staircase, and pulpit

The main altar is elevated and accessed via flanking Baroque-style spiraling staircases, all sheathed in polychrome marble. The entrance to the crypt or catacombs is beneath the altar, which was elevated above the site of the original chapel at the site. On the left of the nave is an elevated polychrome marble pulpit, designed by Dionisi Lazzari.

The crypt, once site of a paleochristian chapel, was supposedly the burial site for San Gaudioso, a bishop of North Africa. The crypt has ten shallow altars surmounted by frescoes by Bernardino Fera.

The interior of the upper church and chapels are decorated by painters such as:

- Giovanni Balducci (St Peter Martyr in right 2nd chapel)
- Giovanni Bernardino Azzolini (Virgin of the Rosary and a Condemnation of the Albigensian Heretics in the large chapel and an Annuciation in 3rd chapel on the left),
- Andrea Vaccaro (Marriage of St Catherine in right 4th chapel and St Catherine of Siena receives Stigmata in right 5th chapel)
- Girolamo de Magistro (Santa Lucia left large chapel)
- Giovanni Vincenzo Forli (Circumcision in large chapel on left)
- Luca Giordano (San Nicola with saints Ambrose and Ludovico Beltrando below in the first chapel on the right, Sermon of San Vicenzo in right 3rd chapel beside the original 5th century icon; also painted Virgin with St Rosa in left 2nd chapel, and a St Hyacinth a cui porge una scritta "gaude fliimi hyacinte". He also painted a St Pius V with Dominican Saints)
- Pacecco de Rosa (St. Thomas of Aquino)
- Gaspare Traversi (ovals in 3rd chapel on left)
- Agostino Beltrano and his wife Aniella de Rosa (San Raimondo da Pennafort in first chapel on left)
- Also works by Anna Maria Bova, Francesco Solimena, Giovanni Pisani, and Filippo Donzelli.

The original church was connected to the veneration of San Gaudioso, a bishop of Abitina in the Roman province of Africa, who died in Naples in c.451 after being set adrift from the north African coast by the Vandal King Genseric. In the 1500s, a 6th-century image of the Madonna and Child was uncovered here, and led to the establishment of this church.

The marble pulpit dates from 1677 to 1705. The organ, now in disuse, dates from the early 1700s.

== See also ==
- 17th-century Western domes
