= Santa Maria di Costantinopoli =

Church of Santa Maria di Costantinopoli
- Chiesa di Santa Maria di Costantinopoli
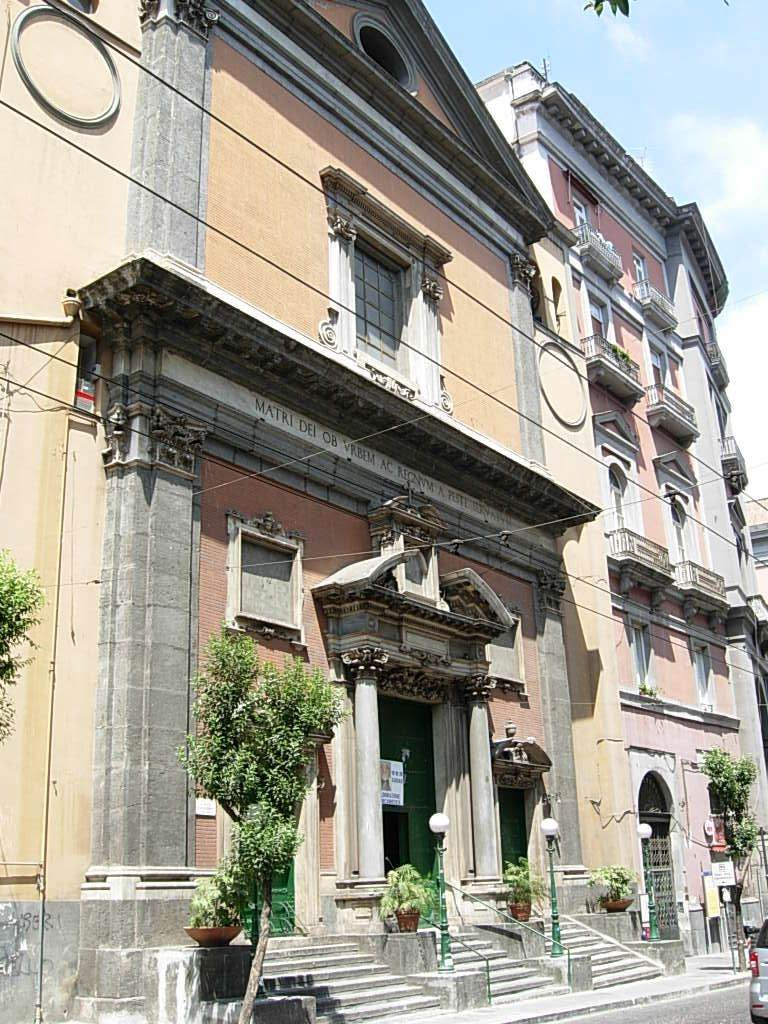
- The façade of Santa Maria di Costantinopoli.
- Church of Santa Maria di Costantinopoli
- 40.852794°N 14.251215°E
- Location: Naples; Province of Naples, Campania
- Country: Italy
- Denomination: Roman Catholic

History
- Status: Active

Architecture
- Architectural type: Church
- Style: Baroque architecture
- Groundbreaking: 1575

Administration
- Diocese: Roman Catholic Archdiocese of Naples

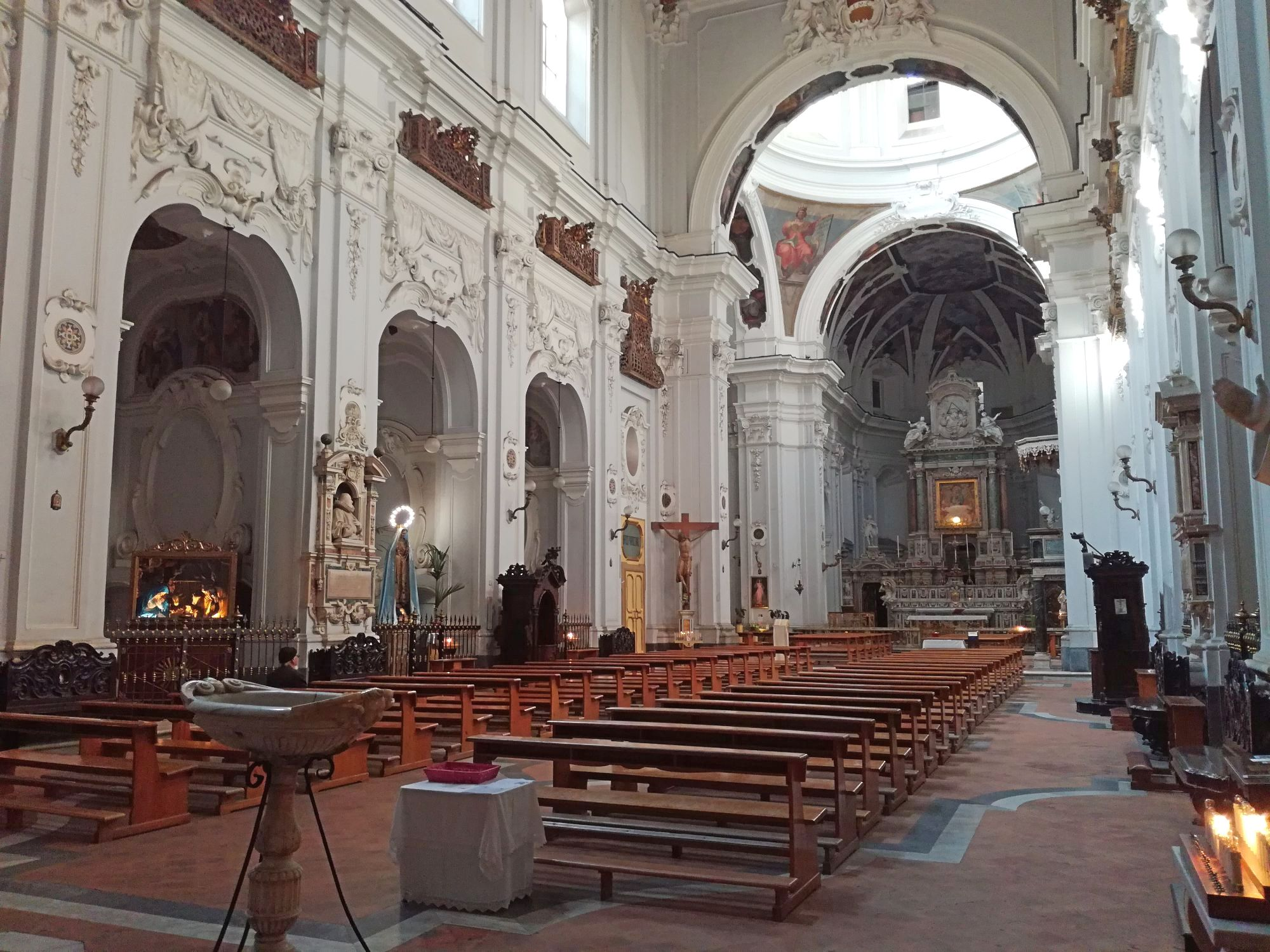
Nave.

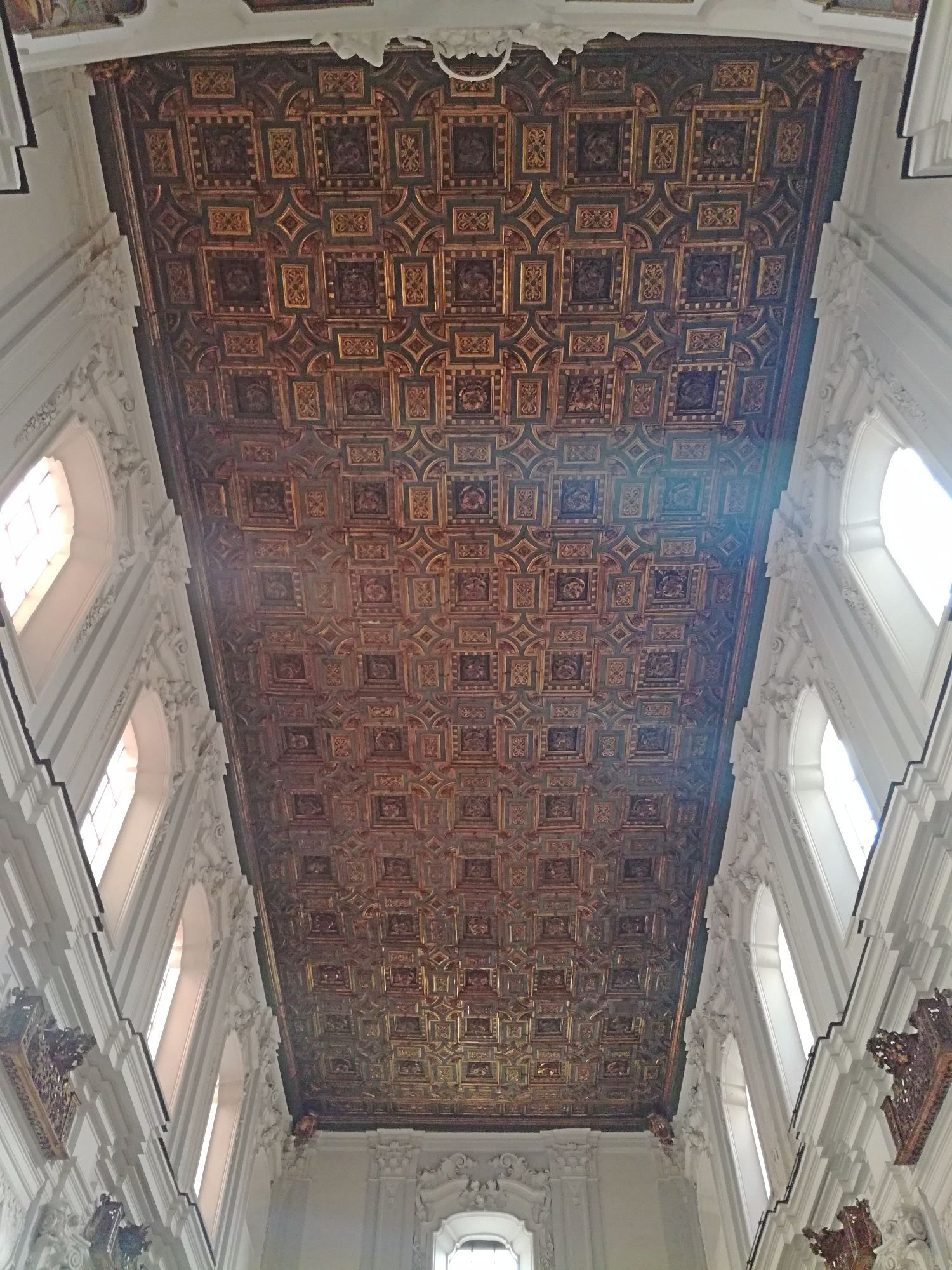
Ceiling.

The Church of Santa Maria di Costantinopoli is a 16th-century Roman Catholic church located on the street of the same name in Naples, Italy, and located a block north of the Academy of Fine Arts of Naples.

== History ==
Its name is allied to the cult of St Mary of Constantinople, the icon image of the virgin attributed originally to St Luke, which rose to prominence in 1527–1528, during one of the frequent attacks of plague afflicting the city. During this time, an elderly woman experienced an apparition of the Virgin who pleaded for the construction of a church where her image stood on a wall. Legend holds the image that was discovered prevented further outbreaks of the plague in Naples.

Construction began in 1575, and continued till completion in the first years of the 17th century under the intervention of the Dominican architect Giuseppe Nuvolo. The façade was completed in 1633. The design is generally conservative with a central linear nave and two aisles, each with five chapels.

The interior was decorated in stucco by Domenico Antonio Vaccaro; the vaulting uses gilded wood. The chapel entries have carved lintelpieces by Niccolò Tagliacozzi Canale (1728).

The first chapel on the right has an altarpiece of the Madonna of the Purity (17th century); the fourth chapel has a painting of the Martyrdom of St. Bartholemew (c. 1585) by the Flemish painter Aert Mytens. The high altar was designed in polychrome marble by Cosimo Fanzago. It frames the 15th-century fresco of Santa Maria di Costantinopoli; above it is a relief of God the father and to the side are statues of saints Rocco and Sebastian.

The apse lunette was decorated by Belisario Corenzio with a fresco of the Virgin & John the Baptist pleading with the Trinity to liberate Naples from the plague. The arches hold images of prophets and sybils.

== Sources ==
- Regina, Vincenzo (2004). Le chiese di Napoli. Naples: Newton e Compton.
