= Aniella di Beltrano =

Italian artist (1613–1649)

Aniella di Beltrano (1613–1649), also known as Diana de Rosa or Anniella di Rosa, was an Italian woman painter of the Baroque period, active in Naples. She trained with Massimo Stanzione, who was a fellow pupil with her husband, Agostino Beltrano (also called Agostiniello) (1616–1665). It is said that her husband stabbed her to death in a fit of jealousy. Her recognized output of paintings is minimal. Attributed to her by Grossi were the ceiling paintings (since removed) of the Birth and Death of the Virgin for the church of Pietà dei Turchini; the portrait of San Biago in the church of the Sanità.
