= Giuseppe Nuvolo =

Italian architect (1570–1643)

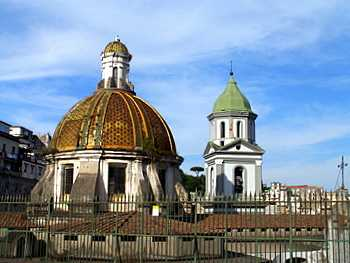
The dome of Santa Maria alla Sanità.

Giuseppe Nuvolo (born Vincenzo Nuvolo, also known as Fra' Nuvolo; 1570–1643) was an Italian architect, an exponent of the Mannerist and early Baroque architecture, active mostly in Naples.

He entered the Dominican Order in 1591, but designed works also for other institutions. He specialized in the use of majolica decorations, especially in the domes for churches in Naples, including that of San Pietro Martire or that of Santa Maria della Sanità. Nuvolo designed both the church and convent of Santa Maria della Sanità.

Nuvolo also redesigned pre-existing edifices in Mannerist-Baroque style, such as the church of Santa Maria di Costantinopoli and the church of San Carlo all'Arena. At his death in 1643, he was working in the construction of the church of Santa Caterina da Siena, also in Naples.

== Sources ==
- Miele, M. (1986). "Fra Nuvolo e fra Azaria. Nuovi dati biografici sui due artisti napoletani del Cinque-Seicento". Archivum Fratrum Praedicatorum. LVI: 133–205.
- Sasso, Camillo Napoleone (1856). Storia de'monumenti di Napoli e degli architetti che gli edificavono: Dallo Stabilimento della Monarchia, sino al nostri Giorni, Volume 1. Largo Regina Coeli, Naples: Tipografia Federico Vitale. pp. 229–230. ISBN 9780371925898.
