= Oratory of Gesù Pellegrino =

Oratory in Florence, Italy

Coordinates: 43°46′42.46″N 11°15′27.28″E

The Oratory of Gesù Pellegrino, also called the Oratorio dei Pretoni, is a Roman Catholic prayer hall or oratory found on the corner of Via San Gallo and via degli Arazzieri in Florence, region of Tuscany, Italy.

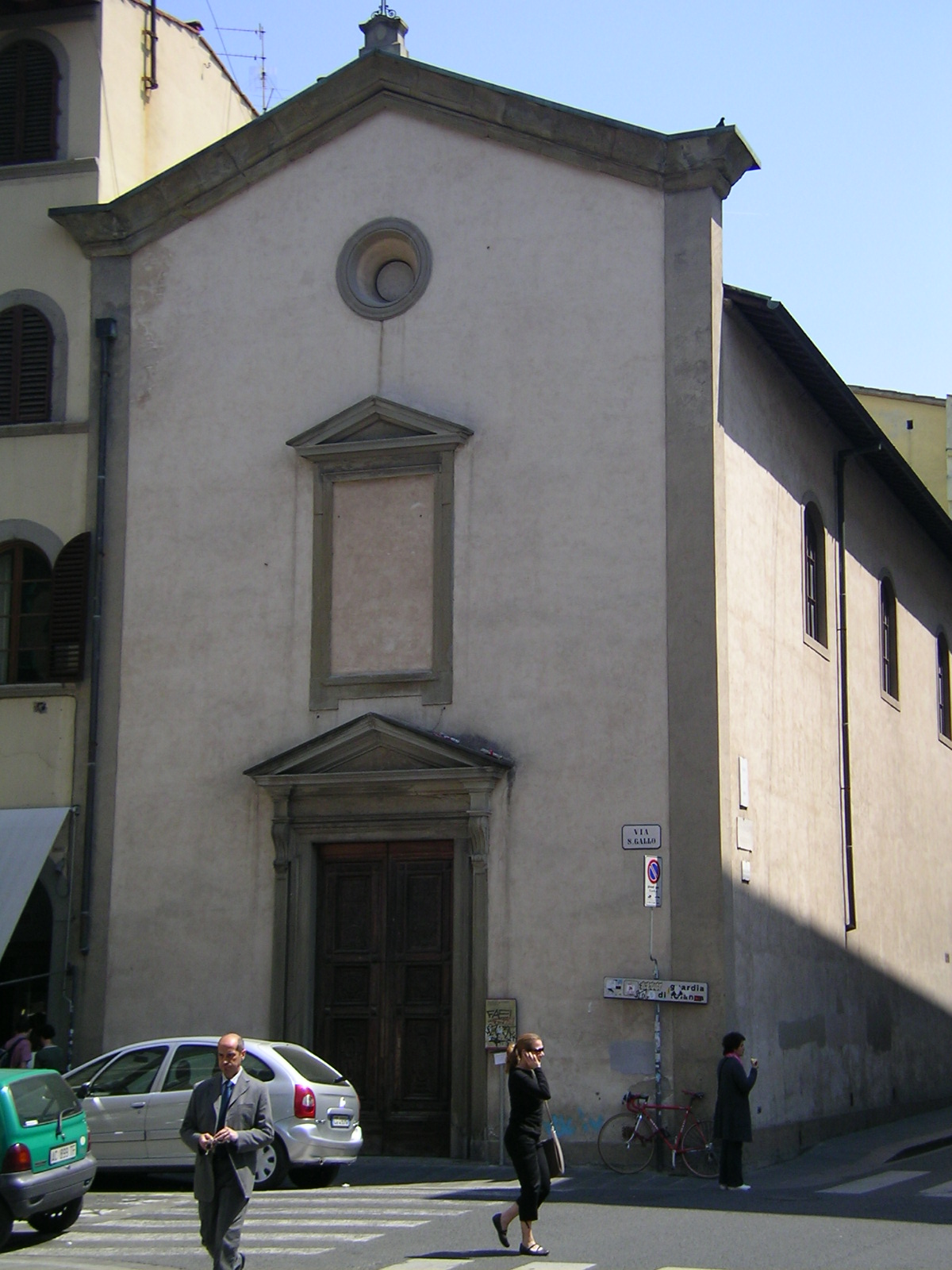
Facade

== History ==
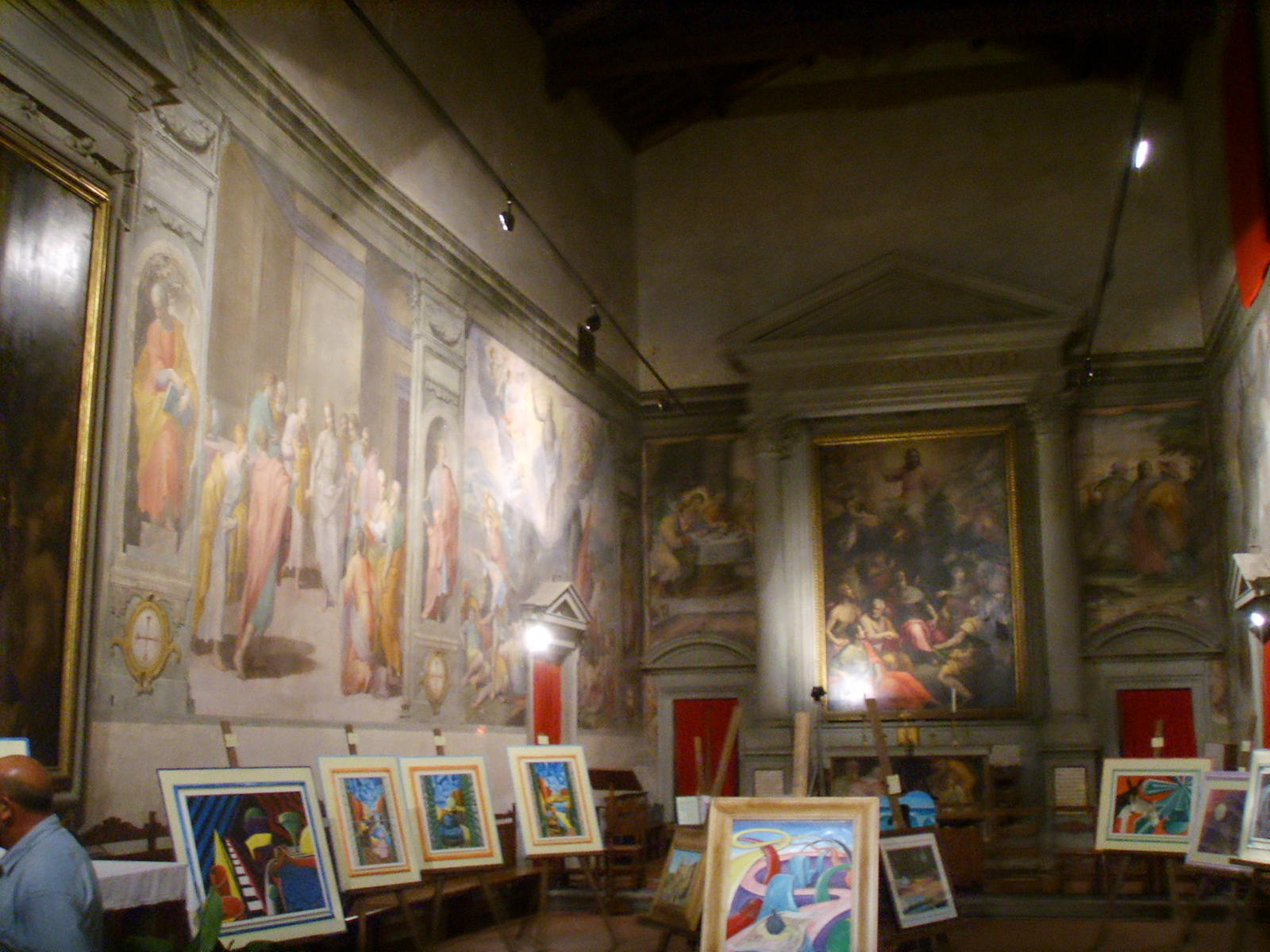
Frescoed interior walls

Formerly the church of San Salvatore, it belonged to the confraternity of that name, until in 1313 the bishop Antonio d’Orso instituted a hospice for pilgrim priests. The church was later dedicated to St James, and under the sainted Archbishop Antoninus, the confraternity set up a hospice for elderly priests.

In 1585 to 1588, commissioned by Alessandro di Ottavione de' Medici, Pope Leo XI, restructuring was directed by Giovanni Antonio Dosio. In the interior are a fresco cycle and three altarpieces with episodes from The Life of Christ (1590) by the mannerist painter Giovanni Balducci. On the counterfacade is a recently restored organ. In the nave close to the entrance is the tomb of a famous parish priest, Arlotto Mainardi (1396–1484).

== Gallery of Frescoes by Giovanni Balducci ==
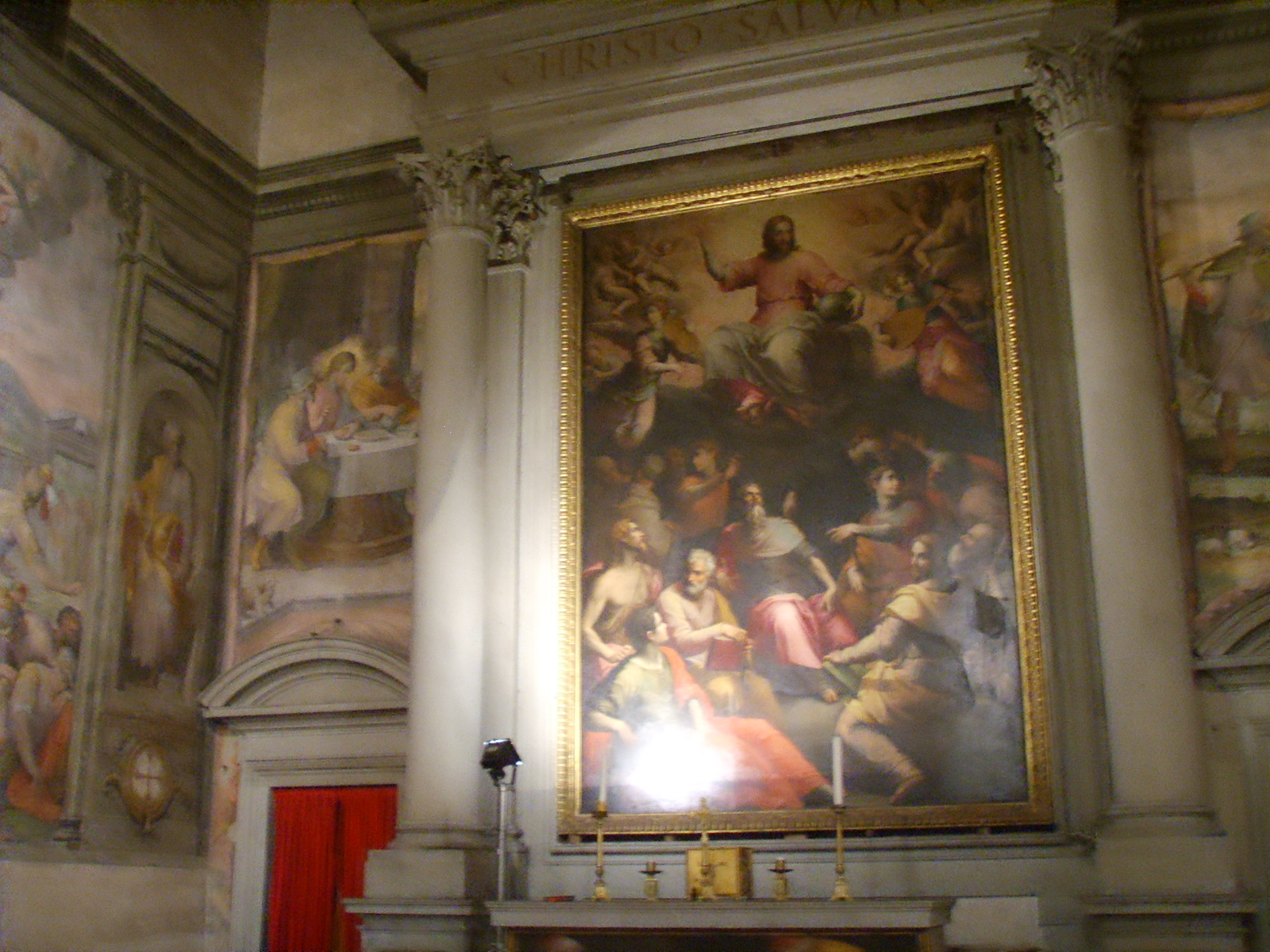
Main altar: Glory of Christ

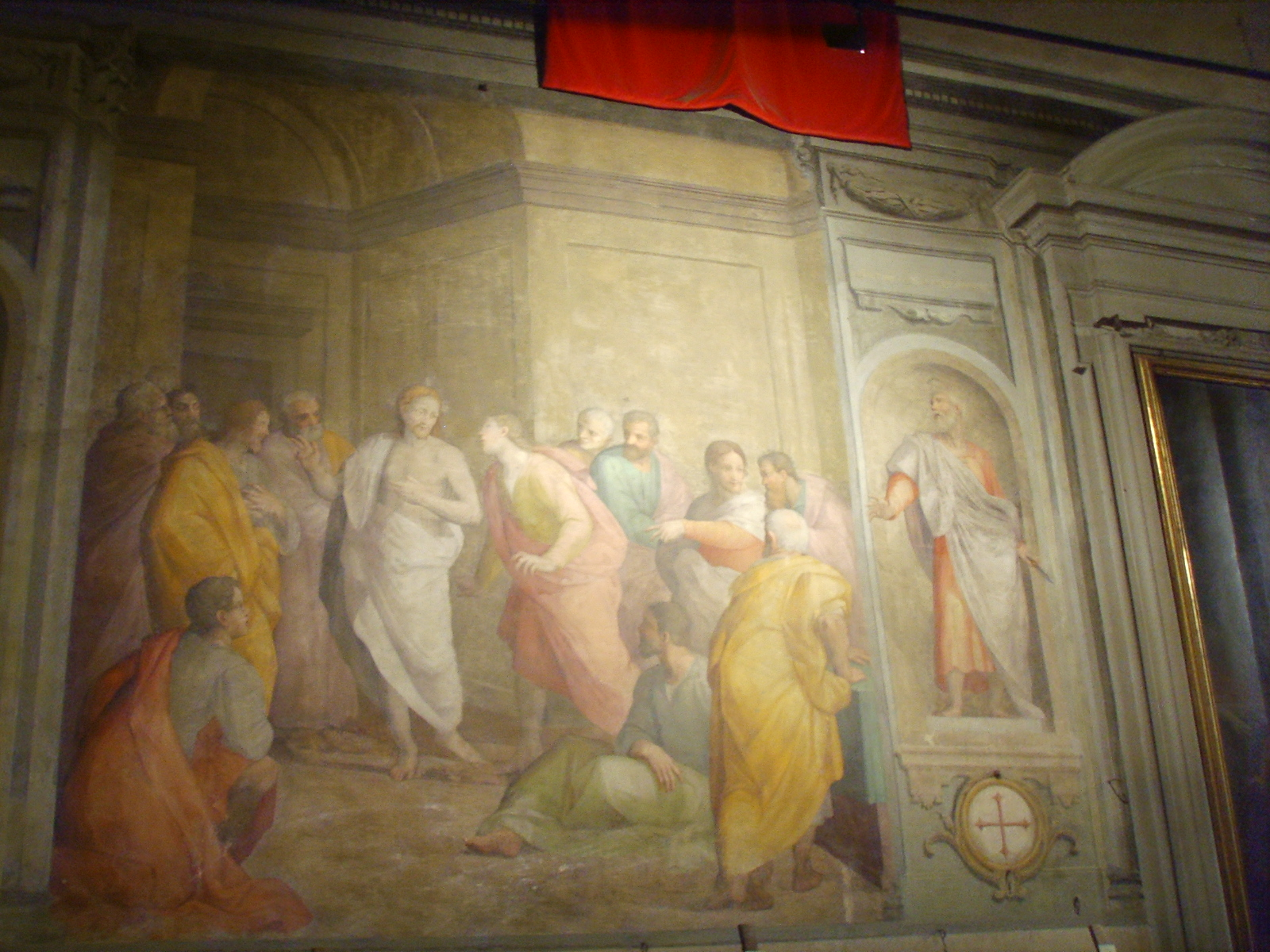
Christ and St Thomas

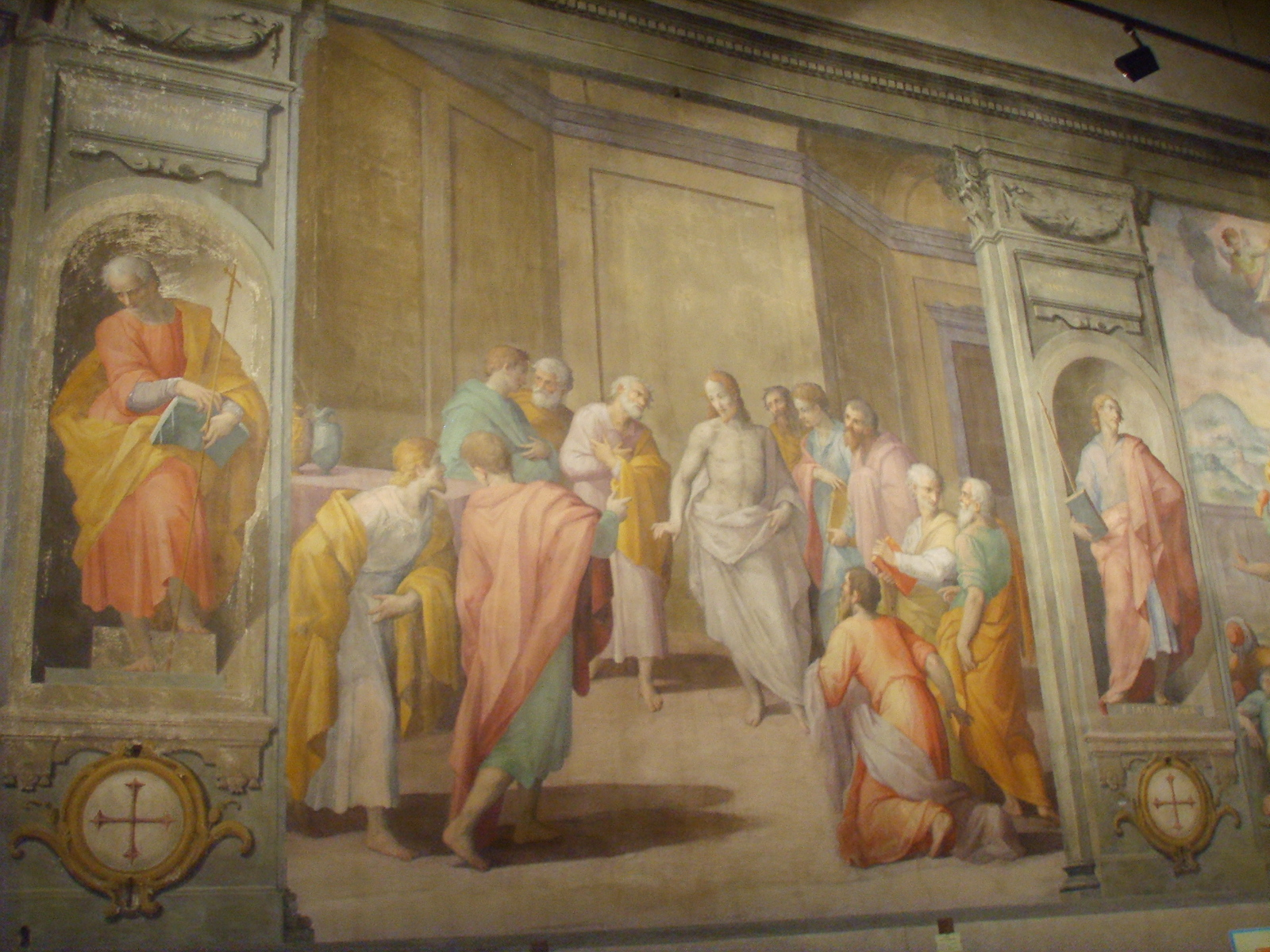
Supper at Emmaus

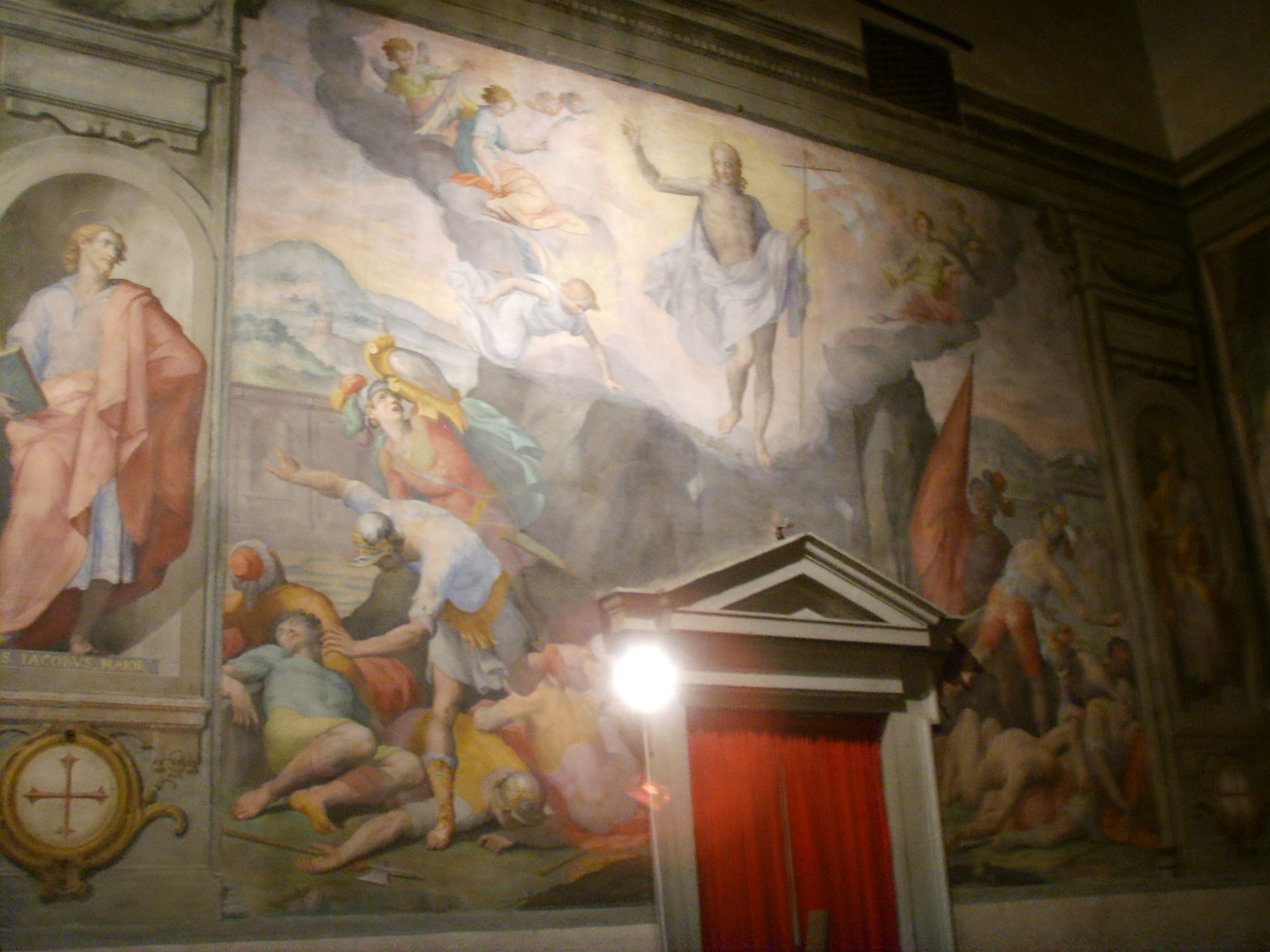
Transfiguration

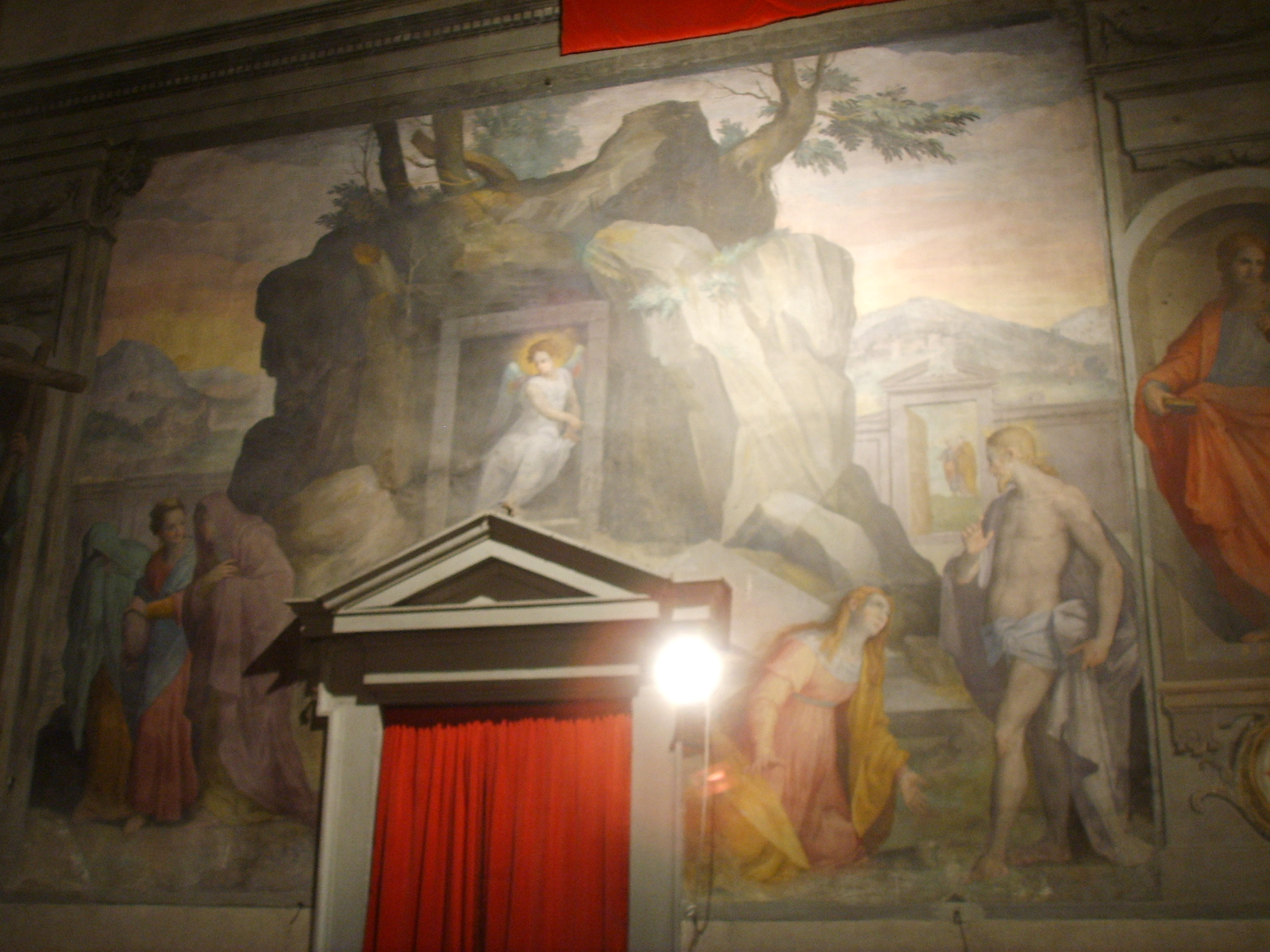
Magdalen and Risen Christ

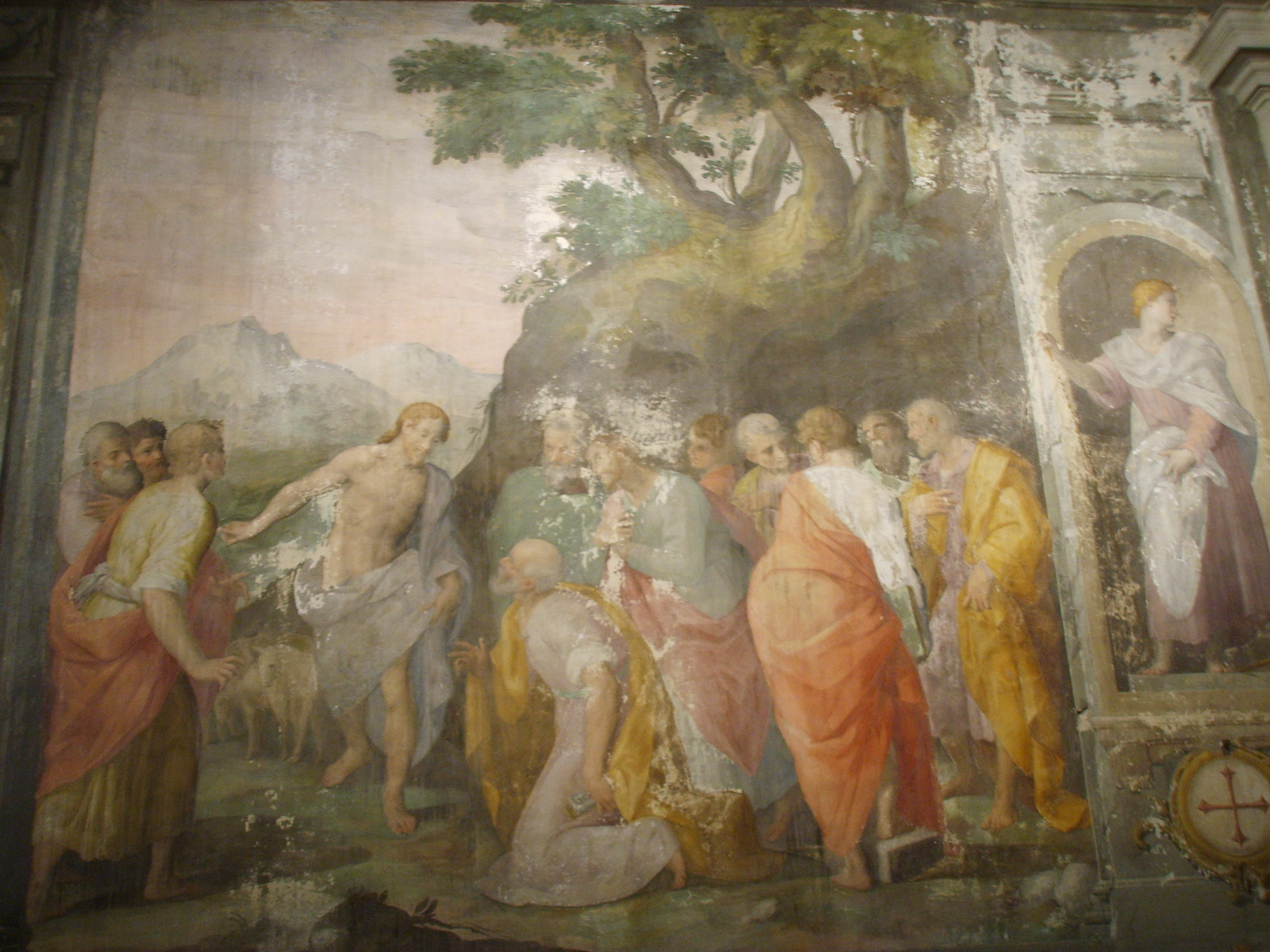

== Sources ==
- Churches of Florence entry
