= Giovanni Balducci =

Italian painter (c. 1560–c. 1631)

- Born: 1560; Florence
- Died: 1630 (aged 69–70); Naples
- Other name: Il Cosci
- Occupation: Painter

Giovanni Balducci, called Il Cosci after his maternal uncle, (c. 1560 — after 1630) was an Italian mannerist painter.

== Biography ==
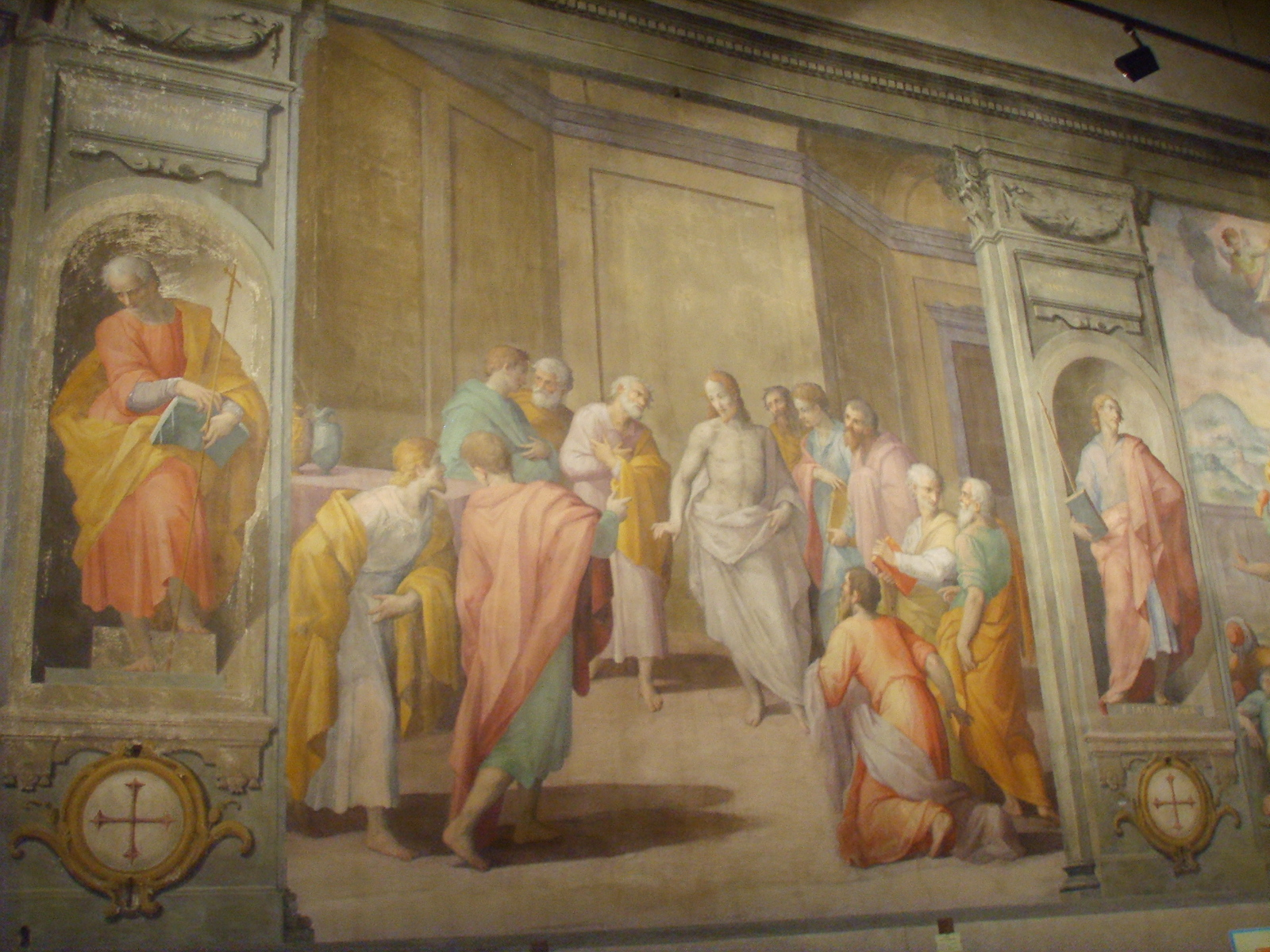
Supper at Emmaus, fresco in Oratorio di Gesù Pellegrino, Florence

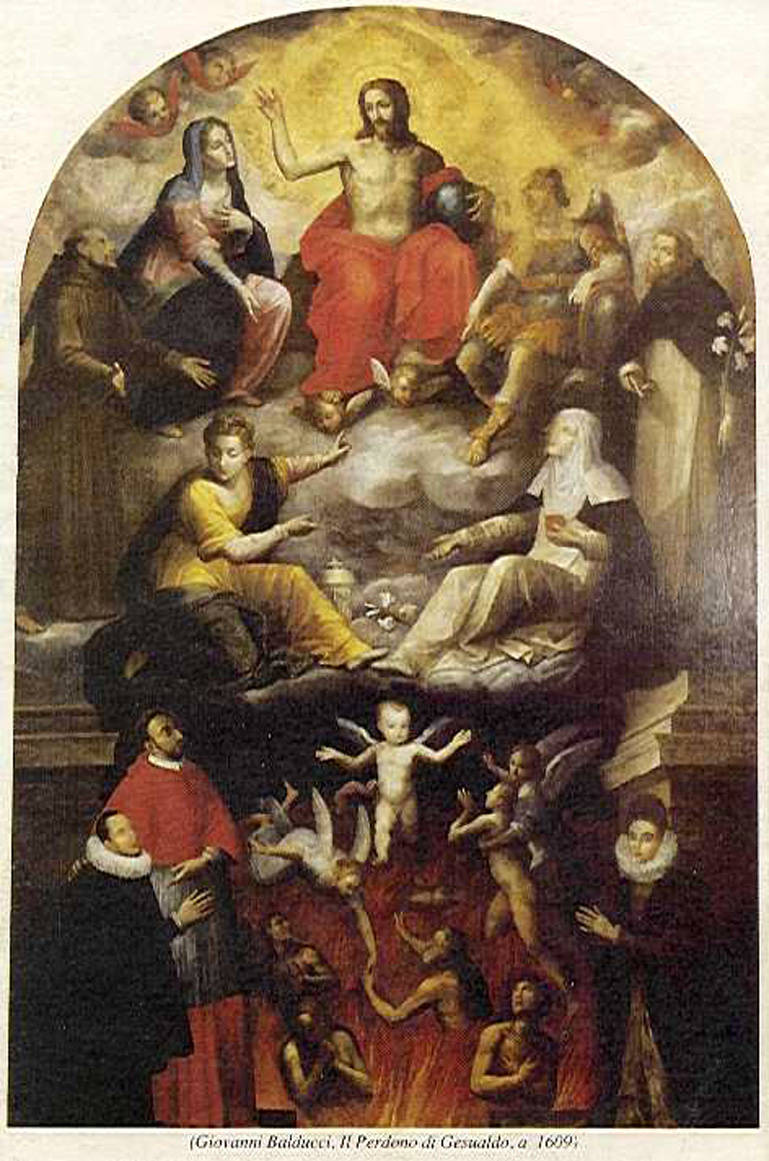
Altarpiece of Pardon of Carlo Gesualdo, Santa Maria delle Grazie, Gesualdo

Born in Florence, Balducci was trained by Giovanni Battista Naldini. Under the guidance and supervision of Vasari, he worked as an assistant to Federico Zuccari in the fresco painting of the Final Judgment (1575–1579), on the inside of the Brunelleschi dome of the Duomo in Florence. He also frescoed a Last Supper in the church. These paintings, in addition to other transient ornamented arches and banners, were part of decorations developed to celebrate the wedding of Ferdinand I de' Medici, Grand Duke of Tuscany, to Christina of Lorraine. During this time, Balducci also painted an altarpiece of the Mystical Marriage of St Catherine for the church of Sant'Agostino in San Gimignano.

From 1577-1580, he aided Naldini in the fresco decoration of the Altoviti Chapel in the church of Trinità dei Monti in Rome. He returned to Florence, to assist Alessandro Allori in the decoration of Vasari's Gallery for the Uffizi. Under the patronage of Cardinal Alessandro de' Medici, who later became the short-lived Pope Leo XI, Balducci was engaged from 1588-1590 in painting a cycle of frescoes depicting scenes from the Life of Christ for the Oratorio di Gesù Pellegrino, located in Via San Gallo of Florence. From 1590-1591, he worked with Naldini in the decoration of Volterra Cathedral, painting in the Serguidi chapel a Miracle of Loaves and Fishes.

By 1600, Balducci had moved to Naples, where he painted altarpieces of St Dominic dispensing the Rosary and St Peter Martyr for the church of Santa Maria della Sanità. In 1609 he painted the Pardon of Carlo Gesualdo, now in the church of Santa Maria delle Grazie in Gesualdo in the province of Avellino. Balducci also continued to work in fresco, painting in the cloister of Santa Maria del Carmine and on the ceilings of the church of the Annunziata in Maddaloni, in Campania.

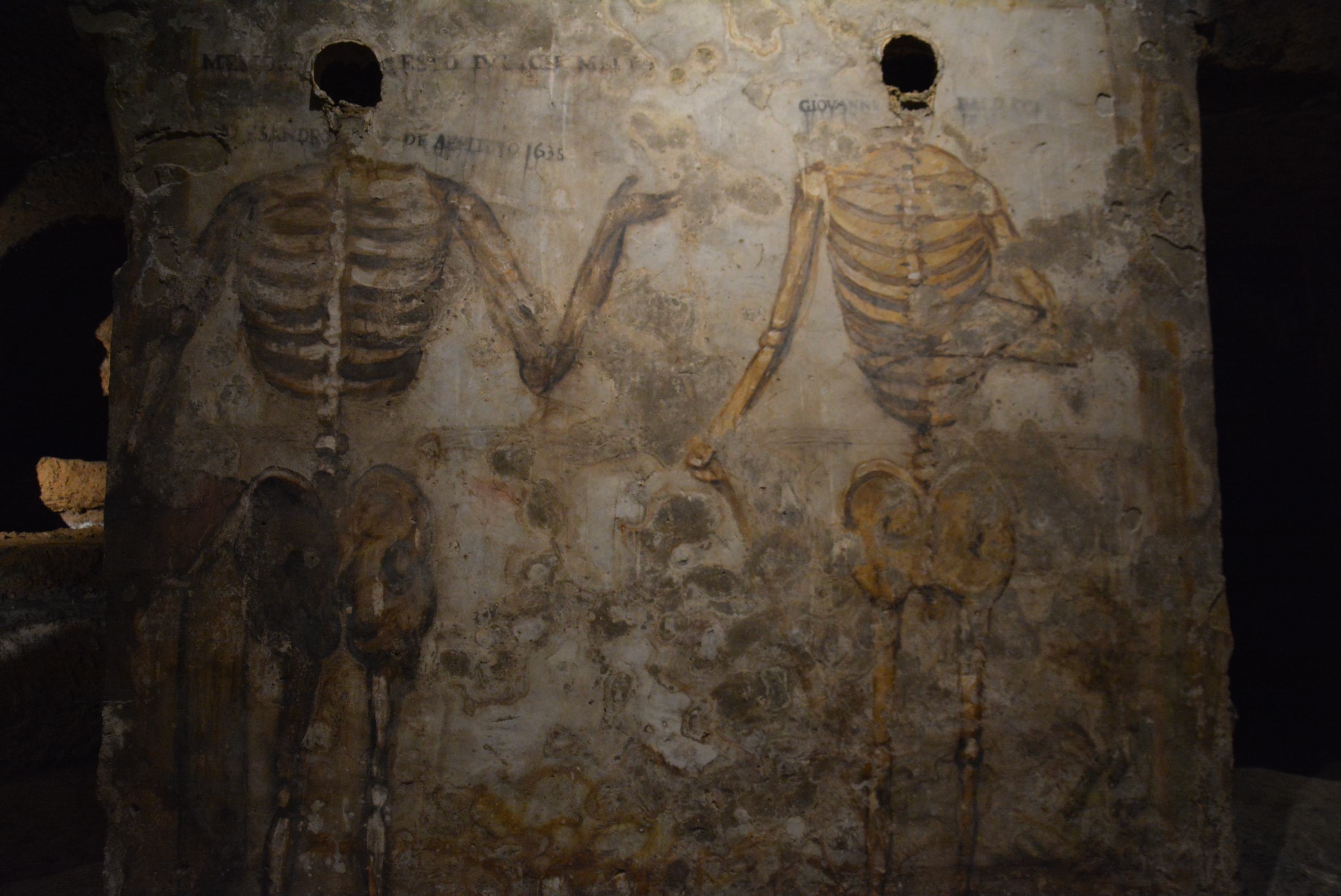
Burials of Alessandro d'Afflitto (d. 1635, left) and Giovanni Balducci

He died in Naples. Balducci is buried in the catacombs beneath Santa Maria della Sanità, where members of the Neapolitan upper class were interred, with their heads placed in frescoes created by Balducci depicting their bodies; he too was buried in a similar manner.

== Legacy ==
Balducci has paintings in public collections including two in the United Kingdom.
