= Piovano Arlotto =

Italian priest and humorist (1396–1484)

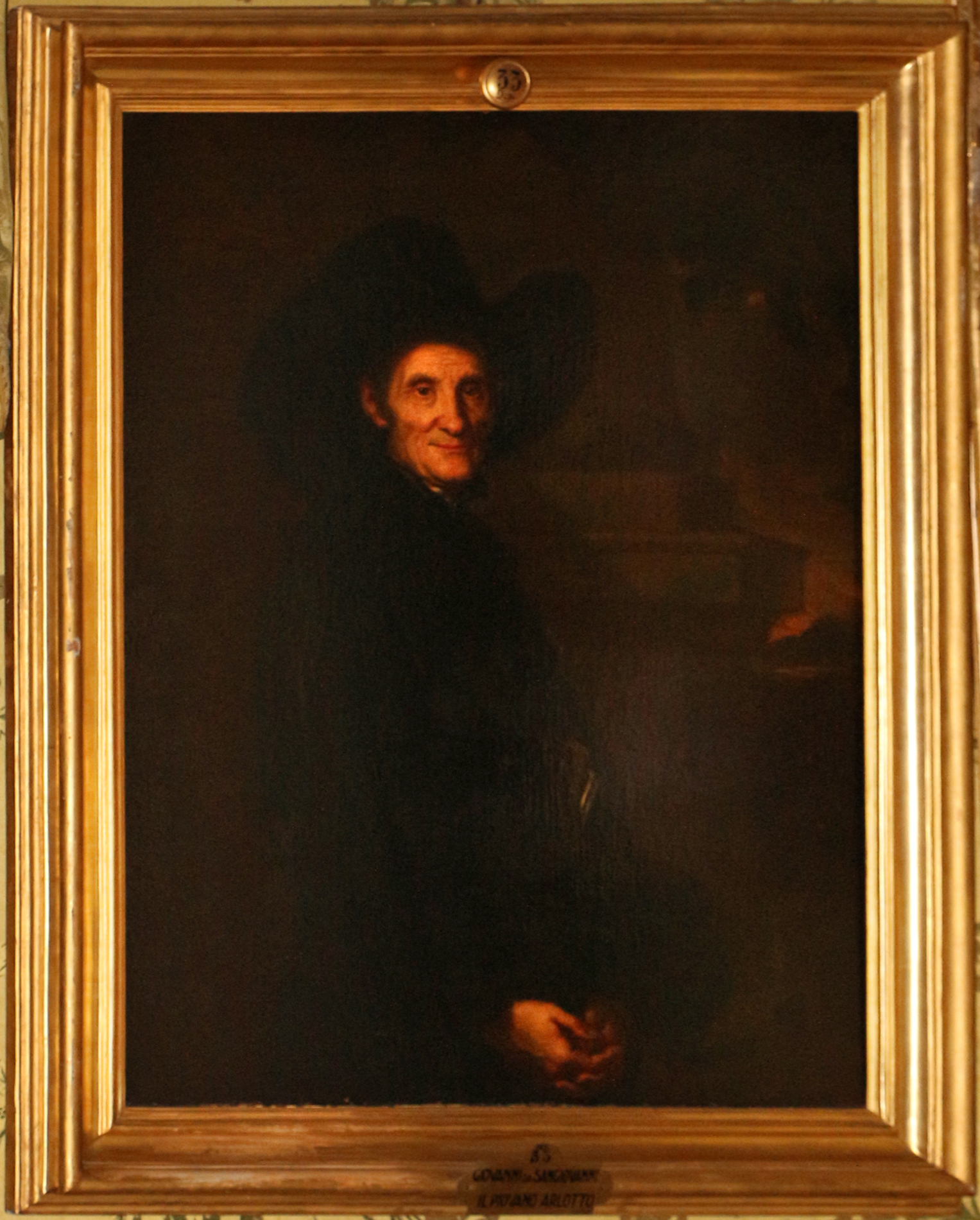
- portrait by Giovanni da San Giovanni
- Born: 25 December 1396; Florence
- Died: 26 December 1484 (aged 88); Florence

Arlotto Mainardi (1396–1484), known variously as Pievano Arlotto or Piovano Arlotto, was a priest known for jests and "pleasantries." The Motti e facezie del Piovano Arlotto, by an anonymous friend, recorded many of these. He had friends among the Florentine elite and the sometimes ribald stories involving him appealed to many listeners.

The only writing known to be definitively by him is the epitaph on his tomb at the Oratory of Gesù Pellegrino in Florence. It states that he had built his tomb for himself and "for anyone else who cared to join him inside." As a folk hero he became known for a wit that tended to value practical virtues like sobriety and hard-work.
