= Giovanni Vincenzo Forli =

Italian painter

Giovanni Vincenzo Forli (c. 1580 in Forlì del Sannio – c. 1625) was an Italian painter of the Baroque period, active in Naples.

In 1607–1608, he painted a Good Samaritan for the Church of Pio Monte della Misericordia, where Caravaggio had just painted the main altarpiece of The Seven Works of Mercy. Giovanni Vincenzo was clearly influenced by the tenebrism of Caravaggio, but his work has a Mannerist air. Subsequently, Forli was to paint a Circumcision for the church of Santa Maria della Sanità.
