= Agostino Beltrano =

Italian painter

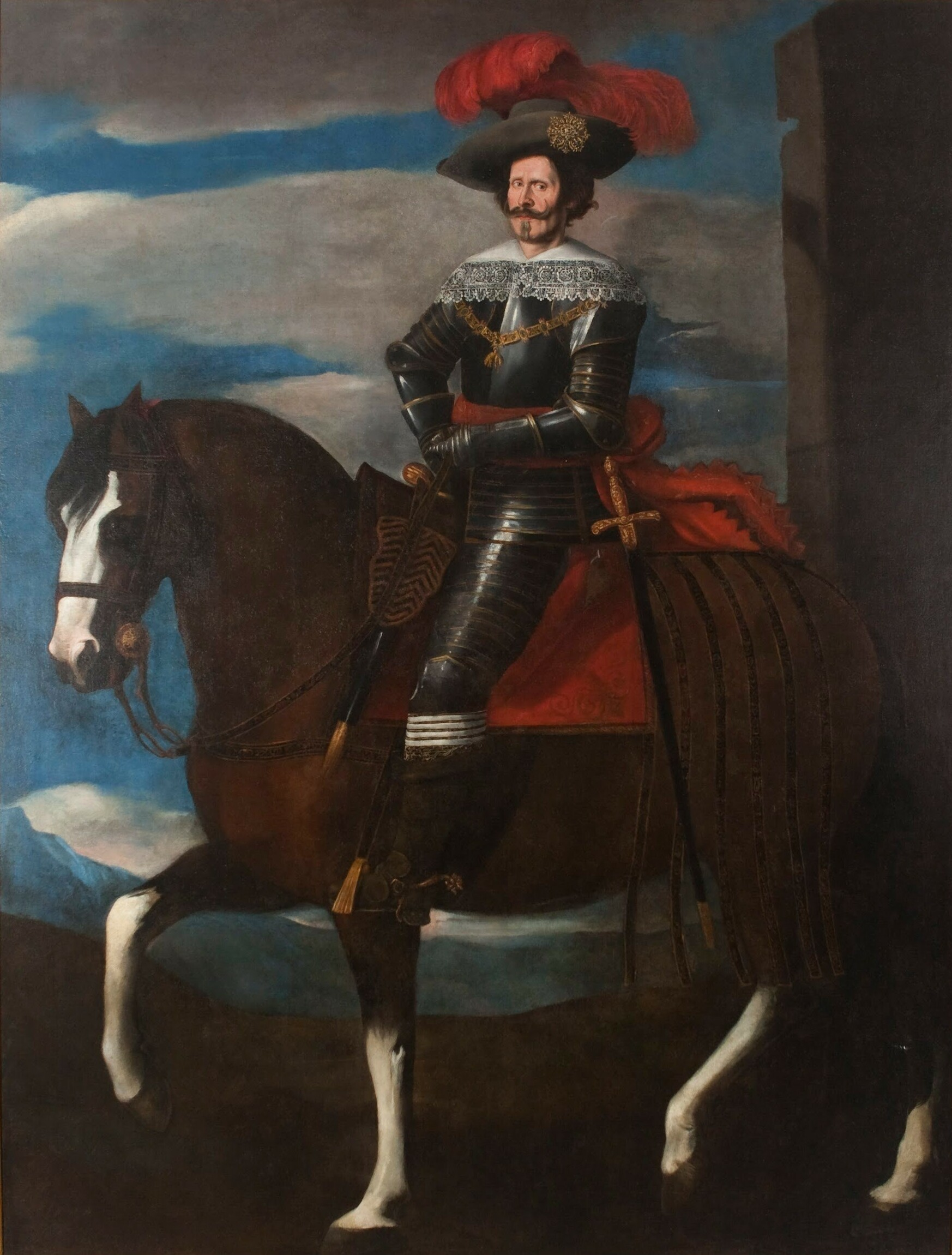
- Equestrial portrait of Carlo di Tocco, c. 1848, Naples, Pio Monte della Misericordia
- Born: February , 1607; Naples, Italy
- Died: 1656 (aged 48–49); Naples, Italy
- Education: Massimo Stanzione
- Occupation: Painter
- Movement: Baroque
- Spouse: Aniella di Beltrano (m. 1626)

Agostino Beltrano (February 1607 – 1656) was an Italian painter active in the Baroque period in his native city of Naples. He was a pupil of Massimo Stanzione, the uncle of his wife, and is known to have been active in 1646. He is said to have murdered his 36-year-old wife and painter, Aniella di Beltrano (also known as Aniella di Rosa), in a fit of jealousy. He died in Naples.

== Life and work ==
He was born in Naples between 1614 and 1618. The few details we have of his life derived largely from De Dominici, who says he was a student of Massimo Stanzione. Beltrano married a painter, also a pupil of the Stanzione, Anna (Annella, Diana, Dianella) de Rosa, nephew of Pacecco de Rosa; their sons Nicola Tomaso and Agnese Chiara were baptized in the parish of S. Maria della Carità respectively on 21 December 1638 and on 19 July 1640.

According to De Dominici, Beltrano, provoked by false allegations of a servant on the love affairs between his wife and the Stanzione, would have killed his wife and abandoned Naples, where he would return only after the plague of 1656 had eliminated a large number of his enemies. Modern criticism, however, tends to consider this story as a romantic setting: De Dominici himself noted that Paolo de Matteis, in his short biography of Anna, does not mention this violent death. The fact encourages, however, to advance the hypothesis that in the last years of the fifth decade or early the next he made a long journey to the north, journey that would have had great influence on his subsequent artistic development, directing it towards more classical currents.

Among his first works are St. Martin Sharing the Mantle with a Poor, the Martyrdom of St. Alexander (signed and dated 1646) and the Supper of the Apostles (signed and dated 1648) in the cathedral of Pozzuoli. The old half-naked figures in the first two canvases announced their inspiration from Ribera, but Beltrano's treatment of anatomy is so awkward that the nudes look more like a caricature of Ribera than an imitation. To the same time belongs The Sacrifice of Isaac (Naples, Museum of Capodimonte).

In Naples there are more mature and of higher quality works including: Assumption of the Virgin (Hospital of the Incurable, administration, signed and dated 1649); St. Girolamo and St. Nicola da Tolentino (signed) on the side altars of the first chapel on the right of St. Agostino degli Scalzi (properly S. Maria della Verità); The four Evangelists, frescoed in the pendentives of the dome of S. Maria Donna Regina (circa 1650); St. Gaetano on the altar of the third chapel on the left of the church of the Apostles (1655, signed).

St. Biagio Among the Saint Domenico and Saint Pius V, on the altar of the first chapel on the left of Santa Maria della Sanità, can be considered exemplary for the mature style of Beltrano. De Dominici recognized the classical aspects and emphasized "the beautiful color of Guido". Beltrano's gloomy characters had now become very sweetened; in the composition, the dynamic elements were suppressed by a rigid constructive symmetry that was linked to the more conservative aspects of the Bolognese school.

Among his last works were the fresco of the small dome of the chapel of the Immaculate in the church of St. Maria degli Angioli in Pizzofalcone, according to De Dominici of about 1659, and the frescoes in the chapel of the Blessed Salvatore d'Orta in St. Maria Nuova (1661) with scenes from the life of the blessed around a central panel with the Coronation of the Virgin.

== Gallery ==
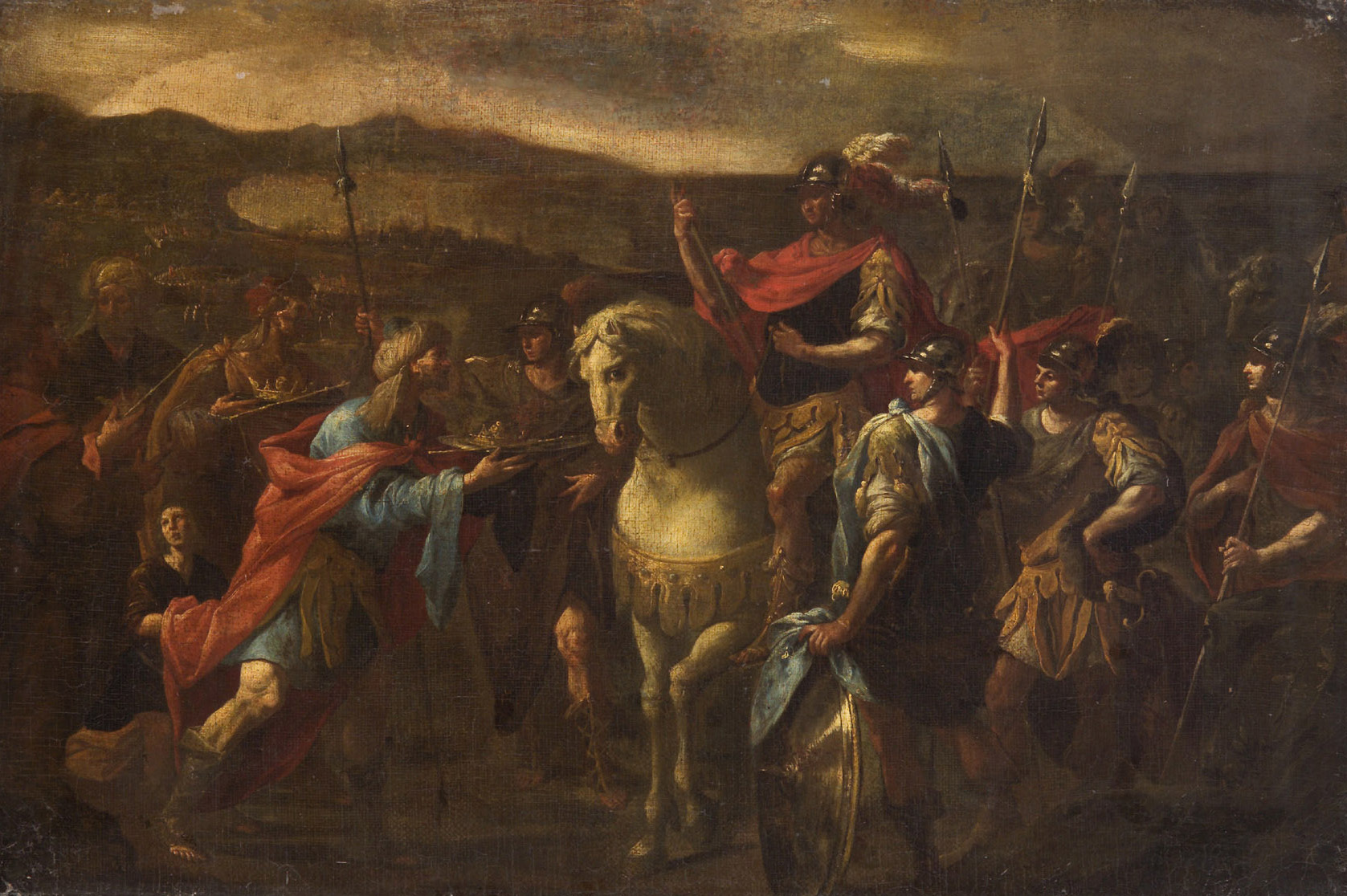
Indian kings pay homage to Alexander the Great, Kunsthistorisches Museum, Vienna

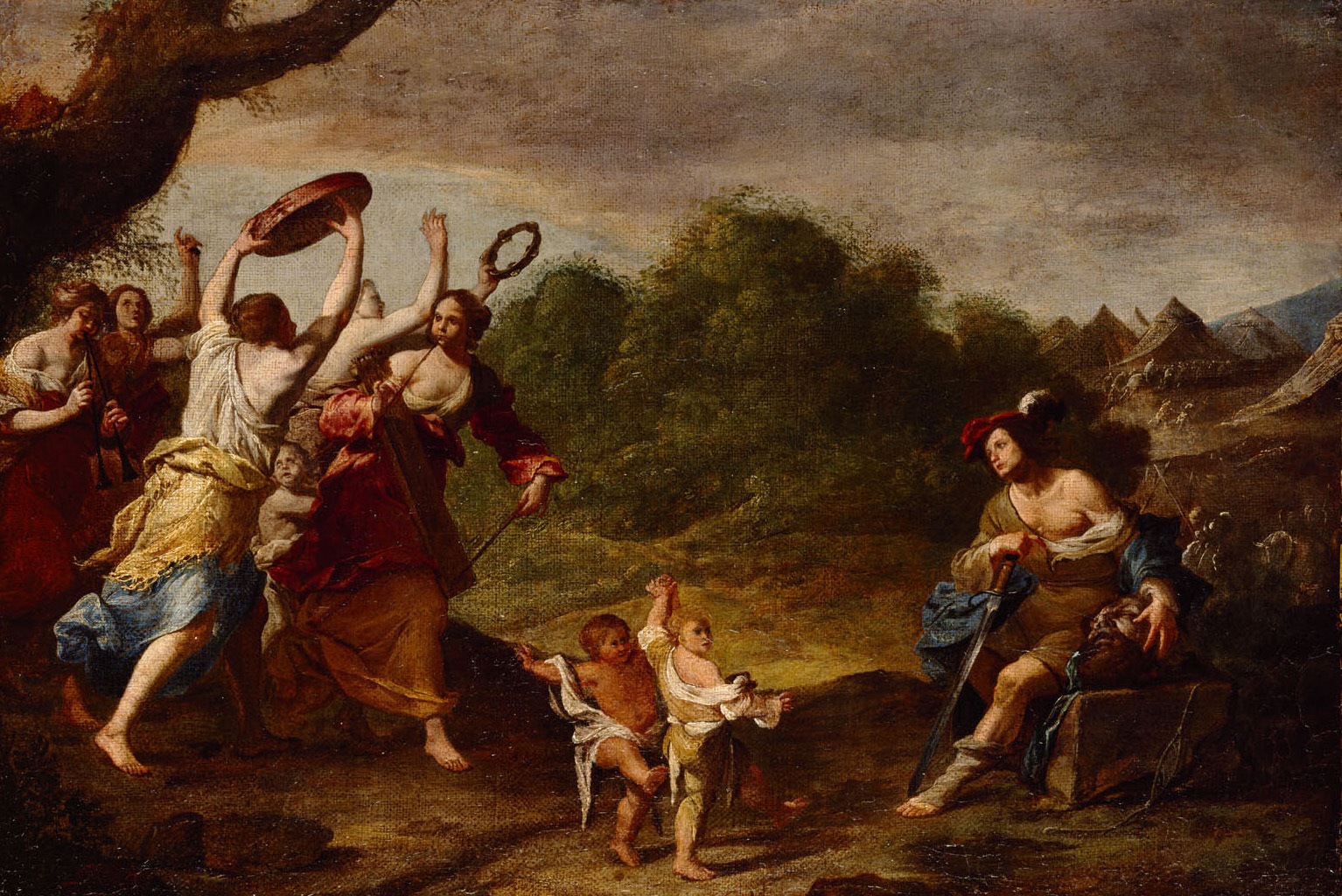
David's triumph, Kunsthistorisches Museum, Vienna

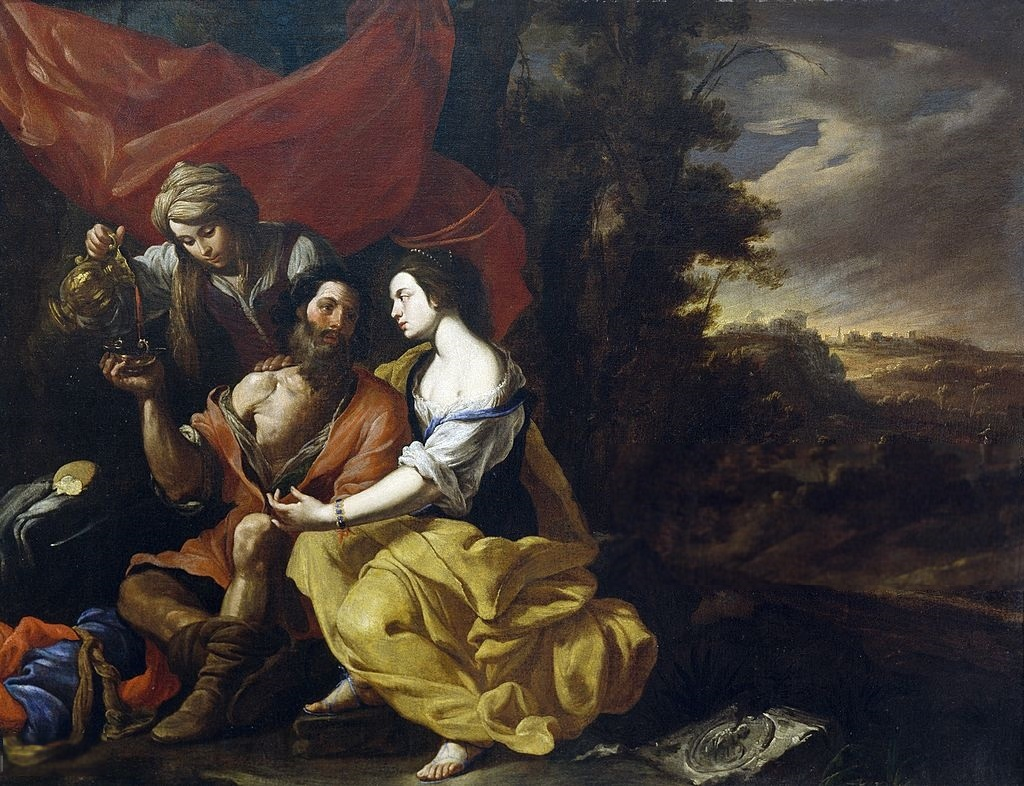
Lot and his daughters, priv. col.

== Bibliography ==
- Ticozzi, Stefano (1830). Dizionario degli architetti, scultori, pittori, intagliatori in rame ed in pietra, coniatori di medaglie, musaicisti, niellatori, intarsiatori d’ogni età e d’ogni nazione. Vol. 1. Milan: Gaetano Schiepatti. p. 139.
- Bryan, Michael (1886). Robert Edmund Graves (ed.). Dictionary of Painters and Engravers, Biographical and Critical. Vol. I: A-K. London: George Bell and Sons. p. 109.
- Enggass, Robert (1966). "BELTRANO, Agostino, detto Agostiniello". Dizionario Biografico degli Italiani (in Italian). Vol. 8: Bellucci–Beregan. Rome: Istituto dell'Enciclopedia Italiana. ISBN 978-88-12-00032-6.
- Ragione, Achille della (2010). Agostino Beltrano, uno stanzionesco falconiano. Naples: Edizioni Napoli Arte.
