= Lorenzo De Caro =

Italian painter

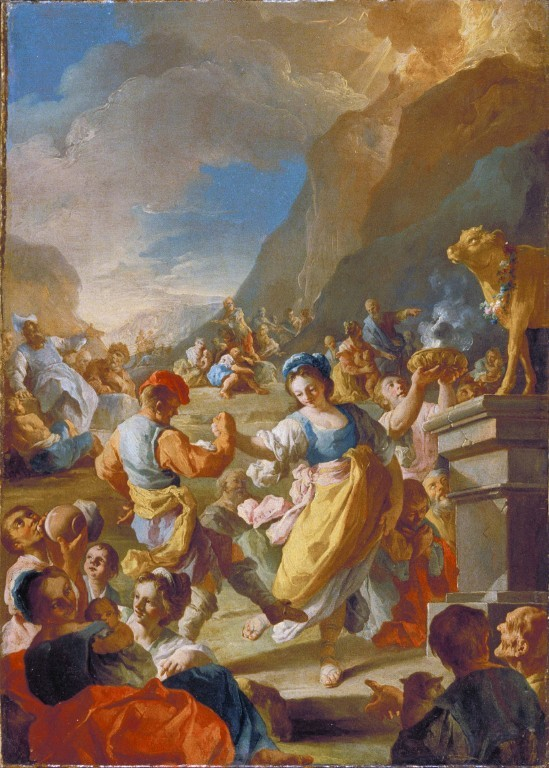
- The Israelites Worshiping The Golden Calf, 1758, Detroit Institute of Arts
- Born: 29 May 1719; Naples, Kingdom of Naples
- Died: 2 December 1777 (aged 58); Naples, Kingdom of Naples
- Education: Francesco Solimena
- Known for: Painting
- Movement: Baroque
- Spouse: Anna Mariana Bozza (m. 1743)

Lorenzo de Caro (baptised 29 May 1719 – 2 December 1777) was an Italian painter, active in the late Baroque style in his native city of Naples. He is among the most individual and whimsical figures in 18th-century Neapolitan painting, although few of his works are known.

== Biography ==
De Caro's biographical information is sparse, and many canvases refer to painter of Neapolitan origin, active between 1740 and 1761. His name was known only from the autograph on the canvases. He was probably a pupil of Francesco Solimena and adopted the brilliant painterly effects and bold brushwork of Solimena’s late style. In 1740 he painted some canvases (dispersed) for the parish church of Cassino and worked in the church of the Cesarea in Naples at least until 1761, the date of the overarch painting.

De Caro is known to have married the 22-year-old Anna Mariana Bozza on 28 February 1743. The couple had ten children. According to a "census" of the local parish in 1757, the painter’s studio was in Vicolo della Porta piccola del Rosario, a narrow street between the areas of Chiaia and the Spanish Quarter. De Caro lived and worked at that address, according to recently discovered documentation in the archives of the Banco di Napoli, reflecting the "public banks of Naples". The records of the Banco San Giacomo include receipts of rent payments made by the painter in 1768 and 1769 to his landlord, the Prince of Cannito, for "two rooms and cellar on the ground floor of the house of the aforesaid Prince in the Sant’Anna di Palazzo road".

Most of De Caro's numerous works for Neapolitan churches and palazzi have been lost. He is most famous for his canvases depicting saints (1757–58) in Santi Filippo e Giacomo, Naples. These are stylistically close to his Charles of Bourbon Visiting the Abbey of Montecassino (Naples, Pisani priv. col.), which may be dated to the same period. The strongly characterized portraits in the latter work suggest contact with the work of Giuseppe Bonito. Notable for their extraordinary spontaneous quality are two small canvases of the Conversion of St. Paul and the Triumph of Judith (c. 1758; Marano di Castenaso, Molinari Pradelli priv. col.). In these the composition is reminiscent of Solimena, but the interpretation is spirited, the touch rapid and the surface rich.

In similar style is the Immaculate Conception (Naples, Palmieri priv. col.), where the sumptuous colour and flickering effects of light and shade are analogous to those produced by contemporary Bohemian and Austrian artists. Indeed, De Caro has been confused with these painters, who were influenced by Piazzetta’s response to the art of Solimena.

== Works in Naples ==
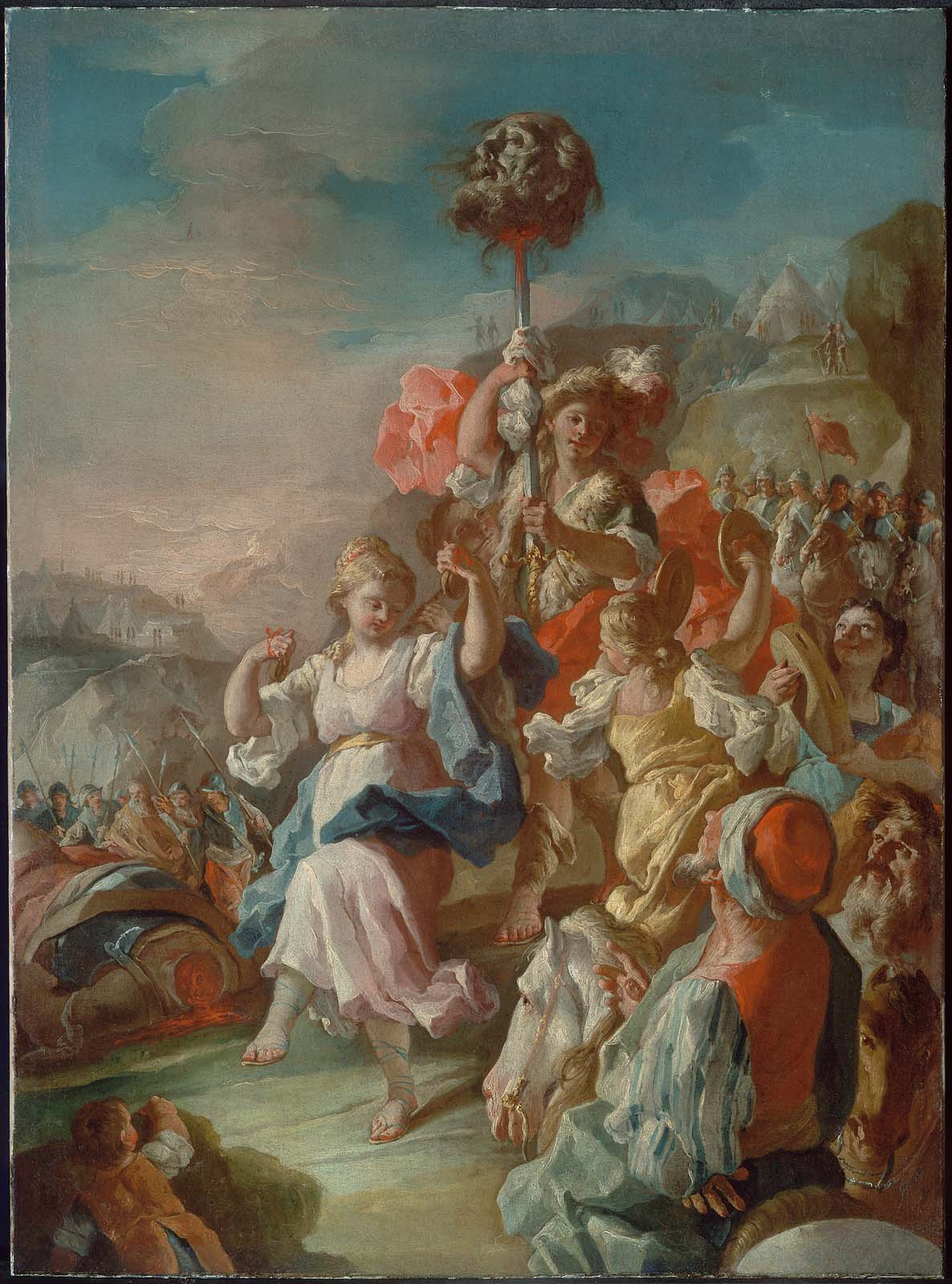
The Triumph of David, oil on canvas, Museum of Fine Arts, Boston

- Church of Santi Filippo e Giacomo (San Gennaro Chapel): St Peter of Alcantara in Glory (known also as St Peter confessing Santa Teresa (1759), Santa Teresa of Avila in ecstasy (1758), Allegory of the faith, of St Januarius in glory, (known also as Decapitation of San Gennaro, St Francis receiving stigmata, and Glory of Angels)
- Church of Santi Severino e Sossio: Paintings of Saint James (destroyed), and of St Jerome;
- Church of Santi Demetrio e Bonifacio : Restoration of painting by Belisario Corenzio;
- Church of Sant'Agostino alla Zecca: Autographed painting: Church closed and art moved elsewhere;
- Church of the Santissima Annunziata Maggiore, Naples: Restoration of painting by Belisario Corenzio, (1746).
- Church of Santa Maria la Scala – Naples: Painting of the Virgin, restored;
- Church of San Girolamo delle Monache : Virgin with Saints Jerome and Bartholomew (1750, lost from Madonna of the Carmine);
- Church of San Diego all’Ospedaletto: Apparition to St Pasquale de Baylon (first chapel on the right), and the Glory of the Saints;
- Church of Jesus and Mary: Painting of the Calvary, stolen in 1979;
- Church of Santa Caterina di Siena: Madonna of souls of purgatory and Mystical Marriage of St Catherine;
- Church of Santa Maria della Neve, known today as San Giuseppe a Chiaia, Naples: Paintings of Saints Vincent Ferrer and Ludovic Bertrand (or St Louis);
- Church of Holy Mary of Patience “alla Cesarea”: Paintings of the allegory of faith (1761) and of the Ecstasy of Saint Pasquale de Baylon;
- Church of Holy Mary of good counsel at Capodimonte: Painting of Our Lady of Sorrows;
- Hospital of the Santissima Trinità dei Pellegrini: Ceiling fresco portraying St Philip Neri kneeling. Destroyed by Second World War. Fresco signed “Laurentius De Caro P. MDCCL”;
- Apartment of the Archbishop of Naples – Piazza Donnaregina – Naples, (formerly held at the Duca di Martina Museum, Villa Floridiana, Naples): Painting of the Wedding of the Virgin, painting of the Decollation of Saint John the Baptist, of the Apparition of Saint Michael Archangel on the Gargano Mount, painting of Saint Francis receiving the stigmata and painting of the Crowning with thorns;
- Congregation of the Charity of God: Painting of the Madonna of the souls of purgatory (1760);
- Confraternity of the discipline of the Cross : Painting of the Madonna of Graces;
- Chapel of la Pietà, adjacent to the Mandriani College, Portici: Paintings of the Crucifixion, the Mourning of Christ and of the Discovery of the Cross (1756 and 1757);
- Museo di Capodimonte: Saint Peter and Saint Paul
- Museum of San Martino: Jesus Crowned with Thorns, St Francis Xavier converting infidels and St John of God;
- Pisani Collection: Paintings of Ferdinand IV, or Charles of Bourbon, visiting a Benedictine abbey, of Princes and Geographies, of Saint Matthew and Saint Gennaro presenting Saints Crispin and Crispinian to the Madonna;
- Prof. Leone Collection: Painting of the Presentation in the Temple;
- Palmieri Collection: Immaculate Conception;
- Perrone-Capano Collection: Serpent of Bronze;
- Troiano Collection: Painting of Christ at Calvary;
- Pagano Collection: Painting of elderly nurse;
- Various Private Collections – Naples: Paintings of Christ carrying the cross, of Sisara and Giaele (3 canvases), of the Triumph of Judith (2 canvases), of the Triumph of Mardocheo, of the Ecce homo, of Saint Peter and Paul, portrait of a gentleman, of Saint Gennaro, of the Madonna and Saint Gaetano;

== Works outside of Naples ==
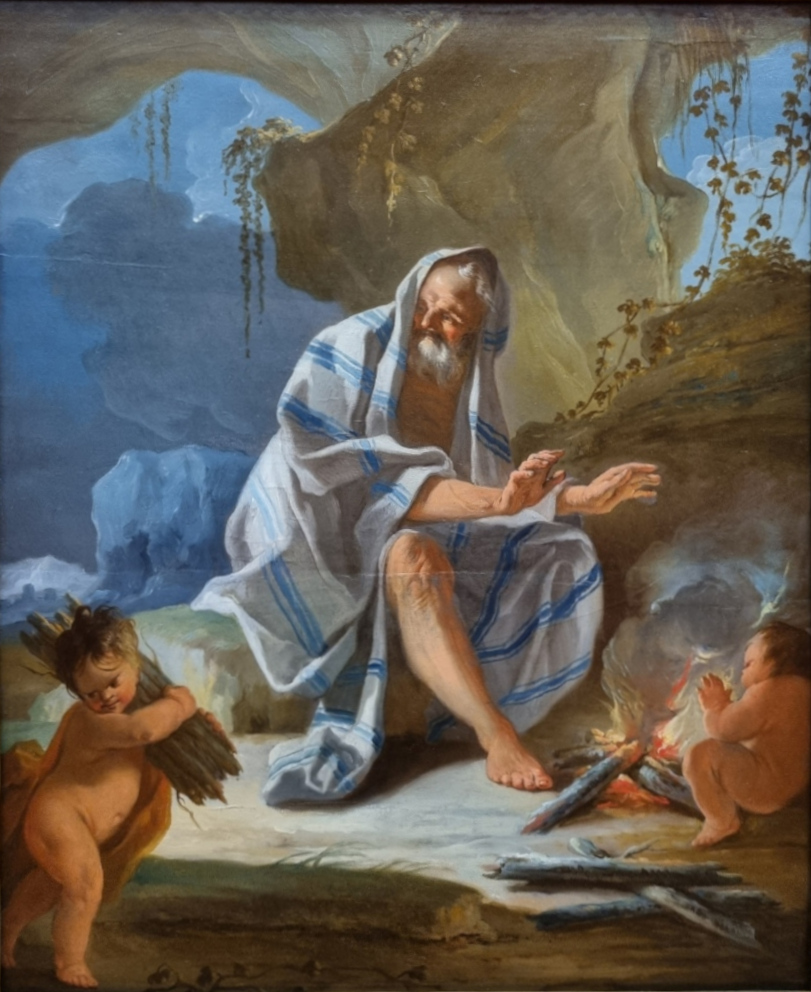
Allegory of Winter, c. 1750, Musée Magnin, Dijon

- Parish church of Piedimonte San Germano – Cassino (Frosinone): Painting of the Saint Bertario the martyr, painting of the invention of the cross, and painting of the Glory of Saint Germano (all destroyed);
- Convent of Saint Francis – Bracigliano (Salerno): the Calvary (fresco);
- Convent of Pietrapertosa – (Potenza): Paintings of Saint Rocco and of Our Lady of Sorrows
- Church of Holy Mary “dell’Olivella” – Cassino (Frosinone): Painting of the Visitation of Mary (signed);
- Museum of Coral, Sorrento: Rest on the flight into Egypt;
- Sannio Museum – Benevento: Painting of the flight into Egypt;
- National Gallery of Bologna: Expulsion of Heliodorus from the Temple (on view at the local Prefecture);
- New York Gallery at Christie’s auction house, U.S.A.: Painting of Samuel anointing King David;
- Museum Of Fine Arts – Boston, U.S.A.: Painting of the Triumph of David;
- Institute Of Art – Detroit, U.S.A.: Paintings of Esther and Assuero and of the Adoration of the Golden Fleece;
- Uffizi Gallery, Florence: Painting of Virtue;
- Museum of Fine Arts – La Valletta (Malta): Painting of Saint Francis Xavier;
- Museum of Solothurn (Switzerland): Paintings of the Education of the Virgin and the Adoration of the Magi;
- Achille Della Ragione private collection – Naples,(formerly at the Zurich Art Gallery, Switzerland): Painting of the Decollation of a Saint;
- Molinari Pradelli Collection – Marano di Castenaso, Bologna: Paintings of the grieving Virgin, of the Triumph of Judith, of the Conversion of Saint Paul, and of Saint Paul’s fall from a horse (the latter formerly at the Bastianelli collection, Rome);
- Private Collection – Milan: Painting of the death of Abel;
- Finarte Collection – Rome: Painting of Saint Francis de Sales preaching to the Salesians;
- Private collection, Paris: Paintings of the Assumption of the Virgin, of the Resurrection of Christ and of the Ascension of Christ;
- Private collection, Cantù (Como): Painting of the Triumph of David and painting of the Triumph of Judith;
- Private home in Naples: Painting of the Triumph of Judith (1758);
- Antique market – Paris, France: Painting of the Allegory of spring;
- Unknown location: Still life paintings of still life with heron and dog, of the Return of Saint Joseph’s brothers (formerly Finante), of Saint Anthony Abbot (formerly Sotheby’s – Florence);
- Private collection - Moscow (Russia): Still life painting with flowers and a view of the park
- Castle of Pescolanciano (Campobasso): The decollation of Saint Alexander the Martyr (1760)

Lorenzo De Caro also carried out work at a number of other locations – both public buildings and private residences: Palace of the Governors of the Church of Saint Anna “Lombardi” on the Guantai road (1741), De Stasio-Maiello home behind the Nunziatura church (1745), De Simone-Coppola home in via Rosario di Palazzo (1748), Comes- Cordosa home at Montecalvario (1748), the home of the Marquis Sterlich on the Nardones street (1749), home of Michele Aveta on the Chiaia bridge (1757), home of Pietro Bozzoli at the Concordia area (1759).

The work of the artist listed above, as well as other recent research, is proof of the fact that Lorenzo De Caro was Neapolitan, as were his forebears, and that he spent virtually his whole life in Naples. The only time he spent “beyond the city walls” would have been to carry out a certain number of commissioned works: in the province of Frosinone, at San Germano (now Cassino) for paintings in the local cathedral in 1740 and for the church of the Virgin Mary dell’Olivella in S. Elia Fiumerapido. He went to Bracigliano (in the province of Salerno) in order to paint the frescoes of the Calvary on one of the walls of the cloister of the convent of Saint Francis.
