= Vincenzo Gemito =

Italian sculptor and artist (1852–1929)

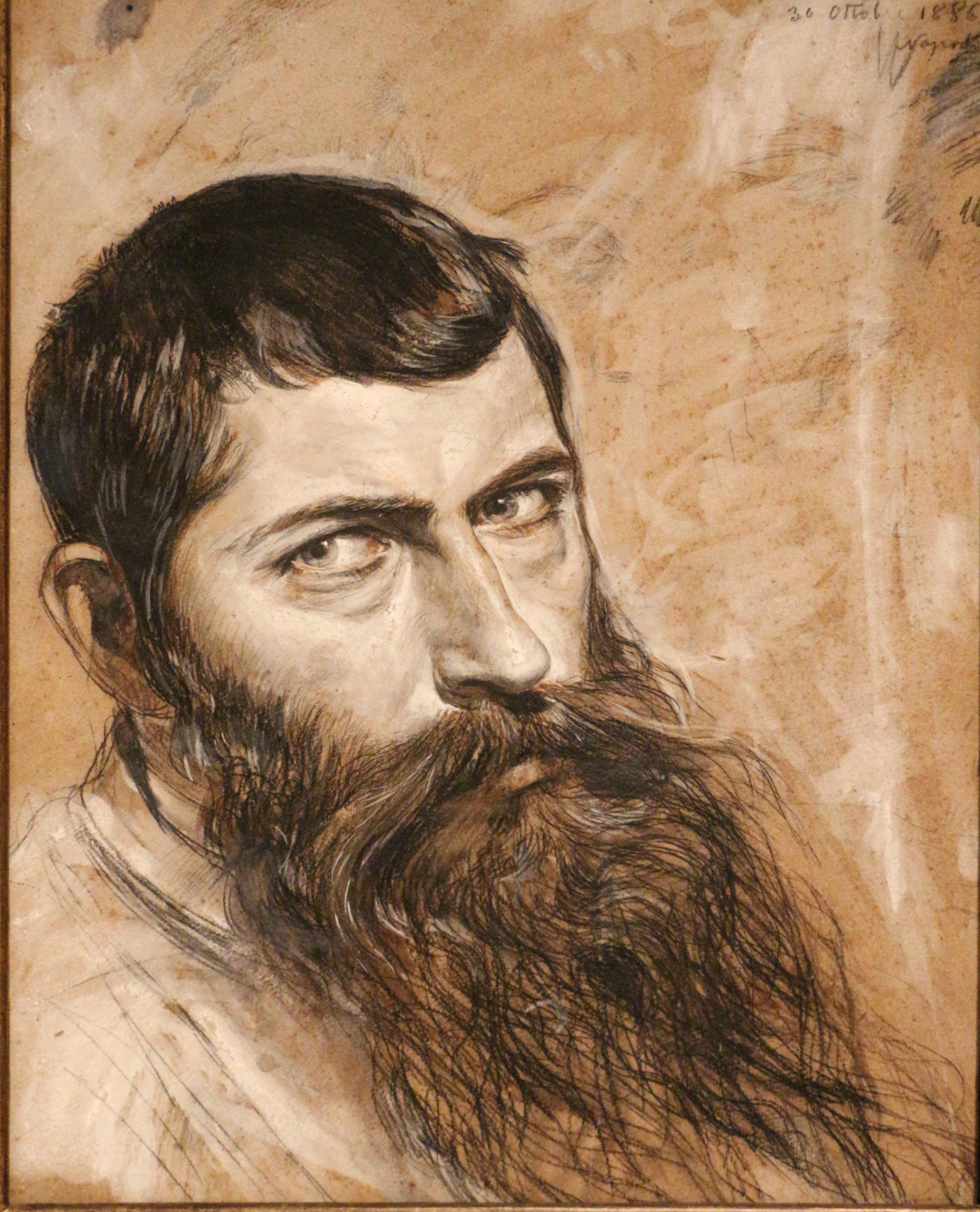
- Self-portrait, 1886
- Born: 16 July 1852; Naples, Kingdom of the Two Sicilies
- Died: 1 March 1929 (aged 76); Naples, Italy
- Education: Accademia di Belle Arti di Napoli
- Known for: Painting, drawing, sculpture, smithing
- Spouse: Anna Cutolo (m. 1882; died 1906)
- Partner: Mathilde Duffaud (1873-1881)

Vincenzo Gemito (July 16, 1852 – March 1, 1929) was an Italian sculptor and artist.

Although he worked in various studios of well-known artists in his native Naples, Rome, and Paris, he is considered to have largely been self-taught, the reason he produced such distinctive works for that time, replacing sentiment with outstanding realism. His work was part of the sculpture event in the art competition at the 1924 Summer Olympics.

== Biography ==
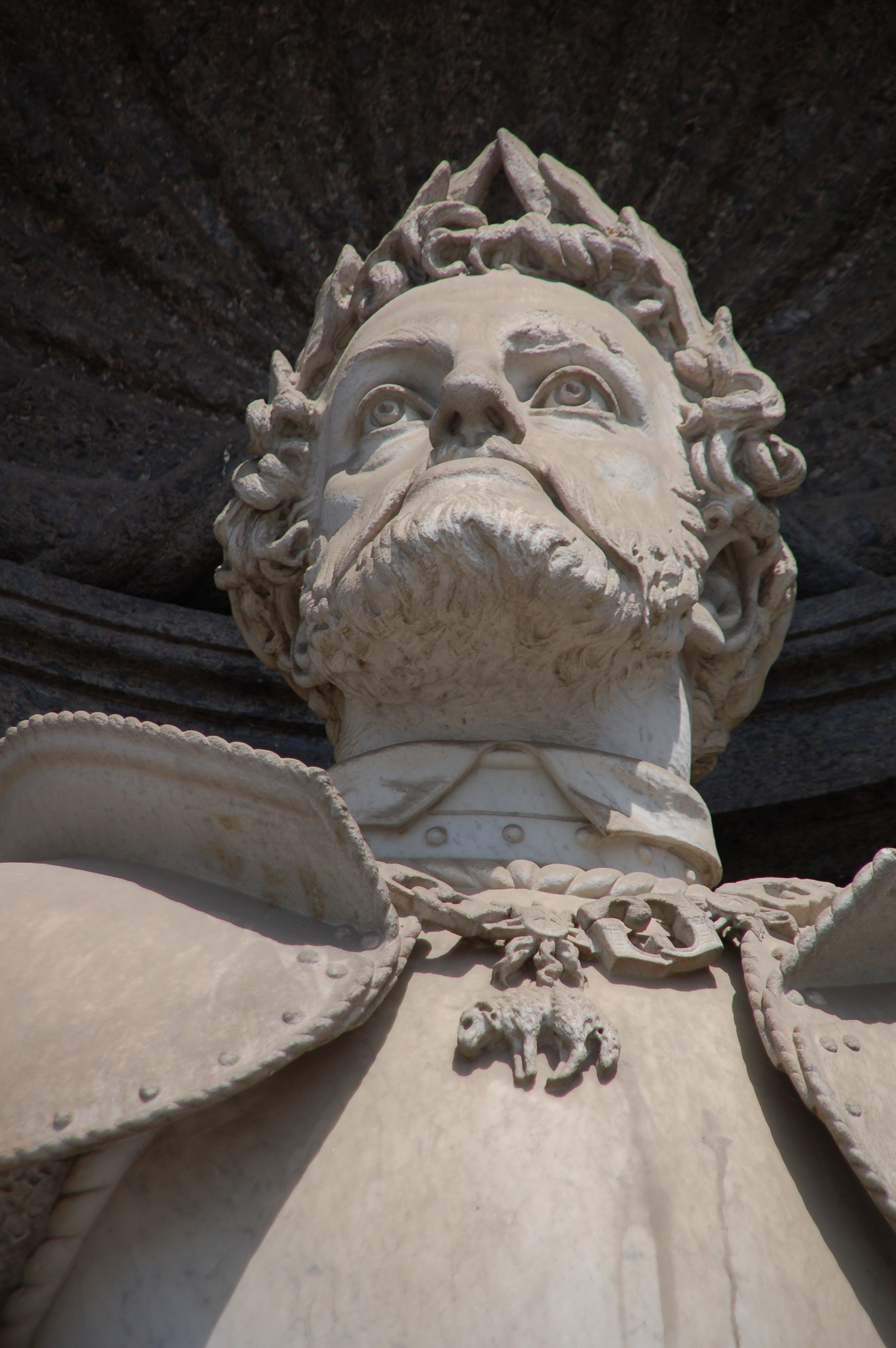
Charles V, Holy Roman Emperor

Gemito was born in Naples to a poor woodcutter's family. The day after his birth, his mother left him on the steps of the dell'Annunziata orphanage and he was taken in to live with the other foundlings. He was given the surname Genito - for generato (“born” in Italian), as was common for orphans, but this somehow became Gemito in orphanage records.

On July 30, 1852, he was adopted by a young family that had recently lost a child. The father was an artisan, and as a young child Gemito was probably encouraged to use his hands. He was working as an apprentice in painter and sculptor Emanuele Caggiano's studio before he was 10 years old, demonstrating a dexterity and inventiveness which he eventually became famous for. He also worked in Stanislao Lista's studio. As a 12-year-old he was enrolled at the Naples Academy of Fine Arts (where he became a lifelong friend of artist Antonio Mancini), and also attended the Domenico Maggiore Academy for night classes.

He moulded the terracotta piece, The Player, (Il Giocatore), one of his most famous works, when only 16 years old. It created excitement when exhibited at the Promotrice in Naples, so much so that King Victor Emmanuel II purchased it and presented it to the Museo di Capodimonte for permanent display.

Gemito moved to Paris in 1877 where he found a great friend in noted French artist Jean-Louis-Ernest Meissonier. As he was creating new works in various media in Paris, he also exhibited his works in noted salons and galleries, and at the Universal Exposition of 1878. It was at the Paris Salon the previous year where he experienced a triumph, with the showing of his Neapolitan Fisherboy, which he had worked on for some years to perfect. The acclaim surrounding that work brought him widespread fame, and lucrative commissions for portraits. He remained in Paris three years before returning to Naples (1880) after his partner died. He went to Capri for a short time, where he married Anna Cutolo.

In 1883 he once again demonstrated his determination to work outside the norm when he constructed his own foundry on the via Mergellina in Naples. He did so to revive the lost-wax process for bronze casting, which had been used during the Renaissance.

In 1887, Gemito was commissioned to create a marble statue of the Holy Roman Emperor, Charles V, to be erected outside the Royal Palace of Naples. Marble was the least liked medium for Gemito, and he fretted that this work was below his capabilities. He suffered a mental breakdown and withdrew to a one-room apartment, and spent periods in a mental hospital. For the next 21 years he worked on drawing but remained a recluse, and it wasn't until 1909 that he resumed sculpting to once again produce masterful works.

In 1952, a postage stamp was issued in Italy to celebrate the 100 years since Gemito's birth.

== Gallery ==
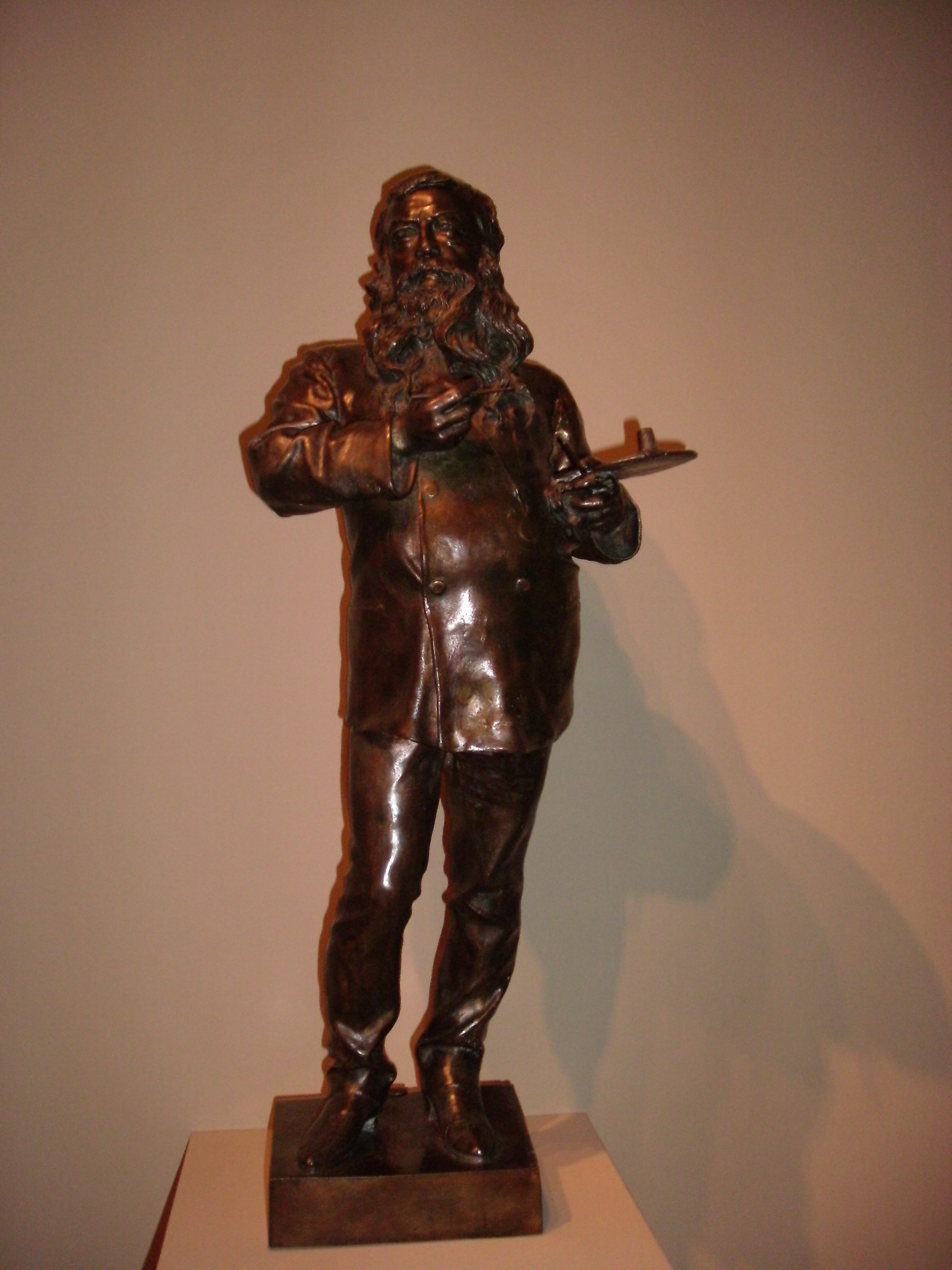
Statue of Messonier, National Gallery of Art

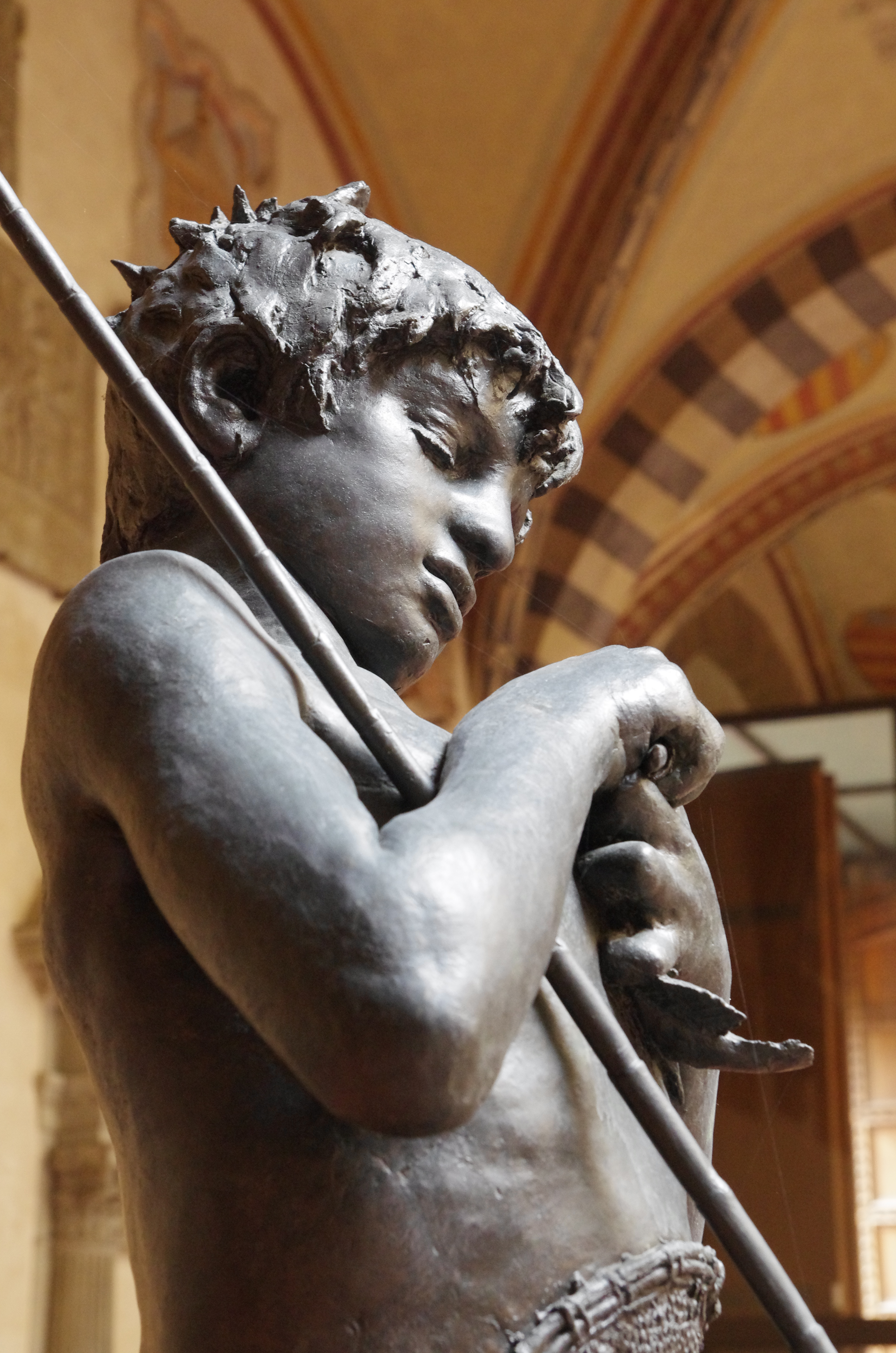
Il Pescatorello (small fishboy), Museo del Bargello Florence

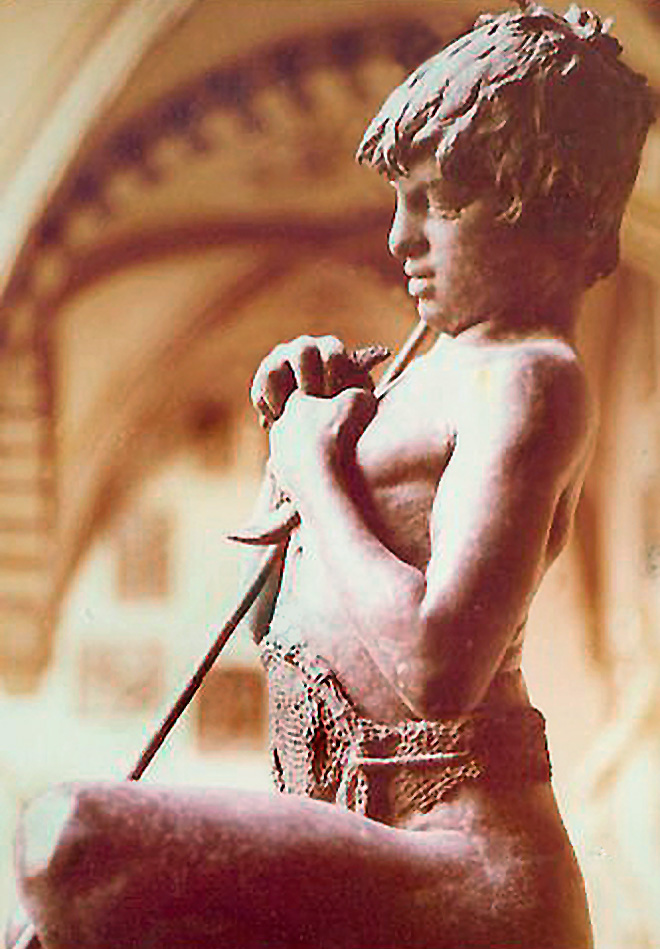
Gemito's Fisherboy, replica at the Louvre, Paris

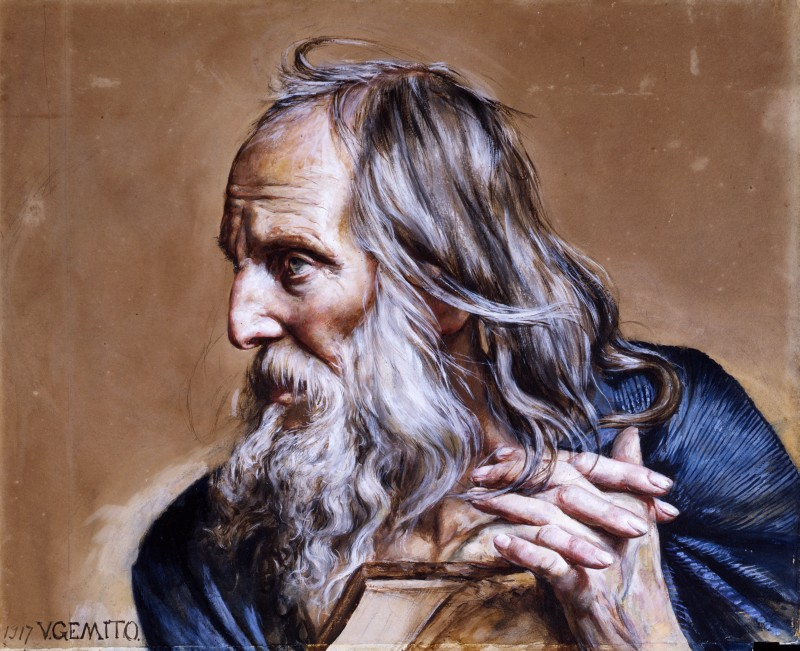
The philosopher or Saint Paul, 1917

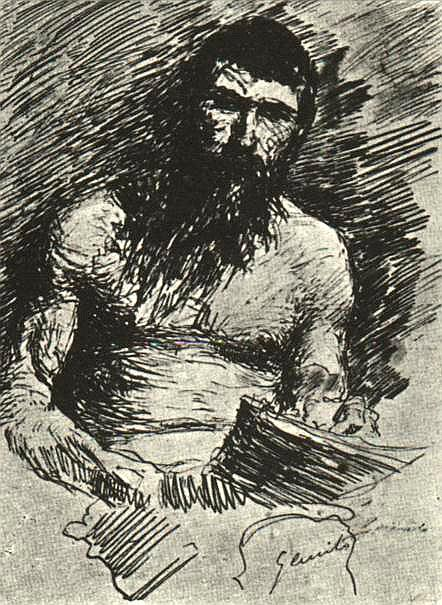
Self-portrait, 1887

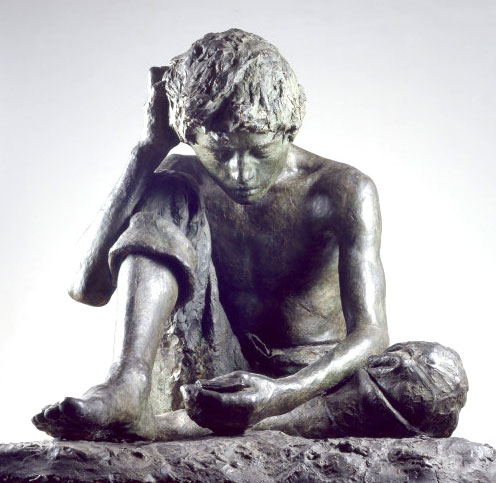
The Cards Player, 1868

== Other projects ==
Media related to Vincenzo Gemito at Wikimedia Commons
