= Santa Maria Maddalena de' Pazzi, Naples =

Roman Catholic church in Naples, Italy

Coordinates: 40.8528°N 14.2444°E

Santa Maria Maddalena de’ Pazzi, also known as the church dei Pazzi or dei Pazzi del Santissimo Sacramento, is a Roman Catholic church in central Naples, Italy; its baroque facade opens on via Salvator Rosa, near vico Nocelle.

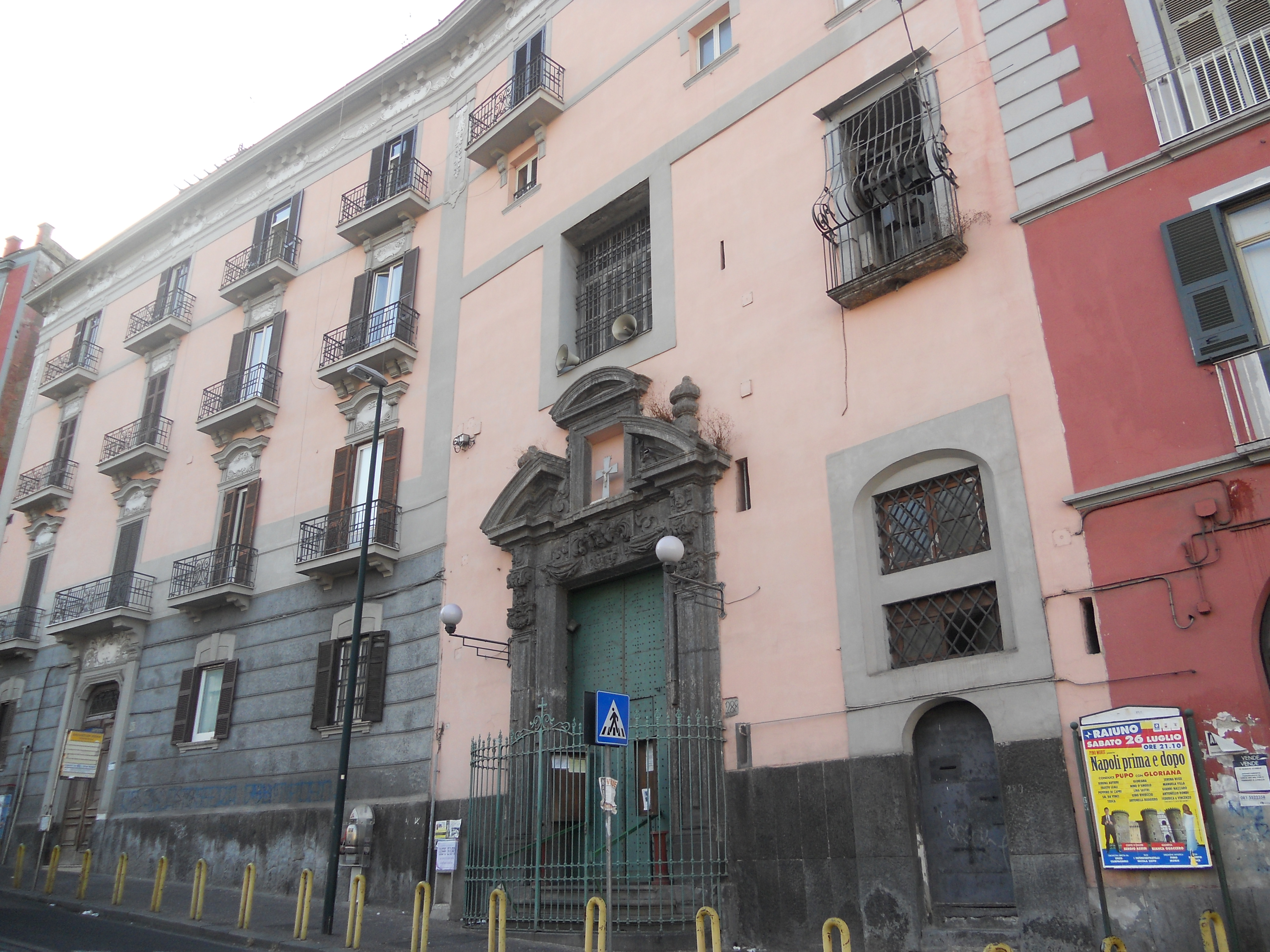
Facade

== History ==
The church gained this name in 1673 under the patronage of the wealthy Flemish merchant Gaspare Roomer of Antwerp, who was devoted to the Saint Magdalena de Pazzi from the Pazzi family in Florence. Roomer attributed a number of events of good fortune to the providence of the saint. The site had held a monastery and church of Santa Teresa delle Santissimi Sacramento, and Roomer was able to change the name, and soon his daughter entered the convent. That was acceptable to her father, who felt most of the noblemen interested in marrying his daughters were more interested in marrying his wealth. Upon dying, Roomer left his home, now known as the Palazzo del Principe di Sannicandro, and his large collection of artworks to the monastery.

The monastery adjacent to the church, originally of cloistered Carmelite nuns, was suppressed in 1806, and French troops used this church and that of San Carlo all'Arena a via Foria as an armory. It was returned as a church in 1815. Until 1927, the convent was used as a military hospital. It was restored in 1932 and refaced with Carrara marble. Lost are the church frescoes to which were in part completed by Giovanni Battista Beinaschi. The original architects were Onofrio Tango and Giovanni Sparanno. Mario Gioffredo designed the convent. Later architects who contributed reconstructions or made designs for the church include Giuseppe Astarita during 1750-1775, Ferdinando Fuga during 1774-1780, and Pompeo Schiantarelli from 1781-1793. The church is adjacent to Gesù e Maria di Pontecorvo.
