= Palazzo Partanna, Naples =

Palace in Naples, Italy

Coordinates: 40.834296°N 14.241480°E

The Palazzo Partanna, also once known as Palazzo Coscia, is a monumental palace located on Piazza dei Martiri 64–66 on the western edge of the neighborhood of Chiaia in Naples, Italy. The palace faces the Piazza dei Martiri.

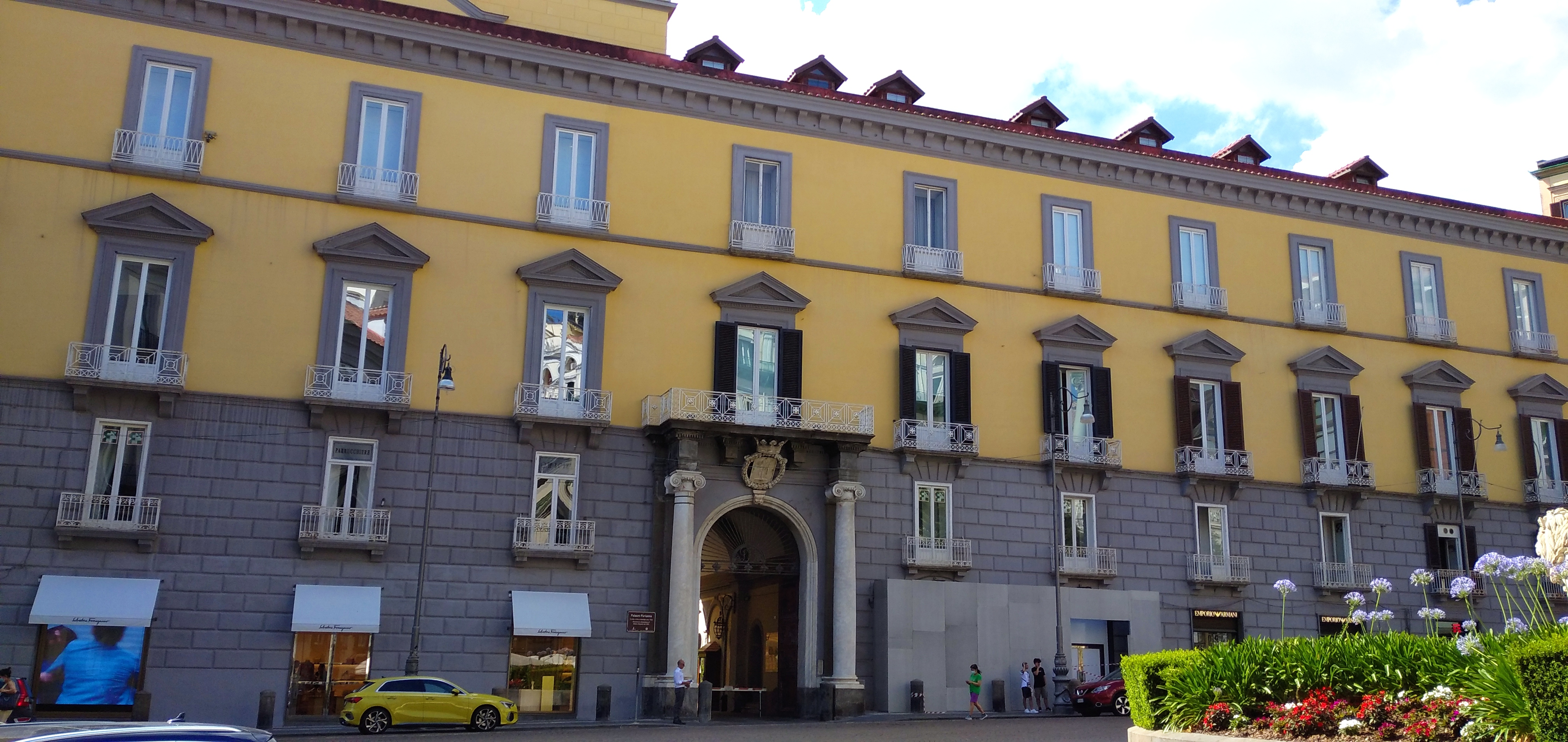
Facade

== History ==
The palace we see today was restored by the architect Mario Gioffredo (1718–1785). In the 19th century, Antonio Niccolini also worked on its reconstruction when it became known as Palazzo Cocozza, and housed the Cardinal Niccolò Coscia, the brother of Duke Baldassarre Coscia. Subsequent members of the aristocratic family ended up selling portions of the palace, until the last member left in 1812. In 1812, it became the offices of the Ministry of War and Navy.

The name Partanna originated from the Duchess of Floridia, Lucia Migliaccio, widow of Benedetto Grifeo, Prince of Partanna, who became the morganatic wife of the widowed Ferdinand IV of Naples. She lived in this palace till she moved to the Palazzo San Giacomo (now City Hall) in Piazza Municipio.

It was damaged by the bombing during World War II. It now houses the Unione degli Industriali of the Province of Naples. The main floor had ceilings with frescoes depicting the Triumph of Judith by Antonio and Giovanni Sarnelli (1749).
