= Giovanni Sarnelli =

Italian painter

Giovanni Sarnelli (23 June 1714 in Naples – 1793 in Naples) was an Italian painter of the late-Baroque style. He was one of at least four brothers: including Antonio (died 1800), Gennaro, and Giuseppe, trained in the studio of Paolo de Matteis, and active painting mainly sacred subjects in Campania, Italy. Their father had been an army officer for the Royal administration. One of Giovanni's brothers, Ferdinando, was a secretary of the Banco di San Giacomo. The biographer Bernardo De Dominici mainly recalled Gennaro, but mentioned that Antonio and Giovanni, then still alive were excellent pupils of Matteis.

Antonio worked with Giovanni in frescoes for Palazzo Partanna, now home to the Industrial Union of Naples. Giovanni also painted a Consecration of the Virgin (1766) for the church of Santa Anna at Sessa Aurunca. He also painted Scenes of the Life of Beato Franco (1751), St Januarius and St Irene and St Gregory celebrates Mass (1774) for the church of Santa Maria del Carmine. He painted a Conversion of St Paul for the church of the Padri della Missione ai Vergini, and a St Joseph and Child Jesus (1787) for the Archconfraternity of San Giuseppe dei Nudi in Naples.
