= Santa Maria la Scala =

Church in Naples, Italy

Coordinates: 40.849292°N 14.265858°E

Santa Maria la Scala is a Baroque style church in a Piazzetta of the same name in Naples, Italy.

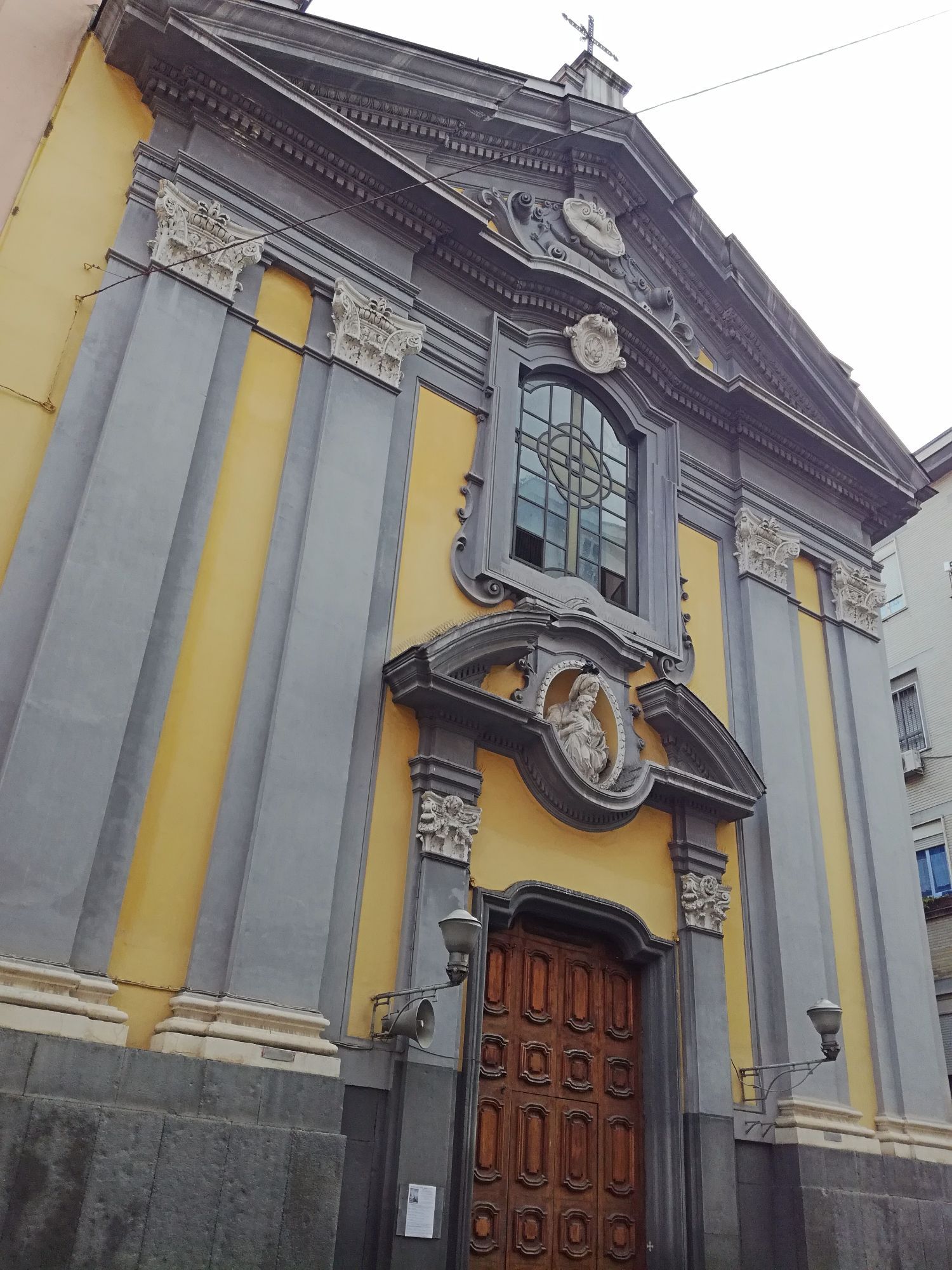
Facade

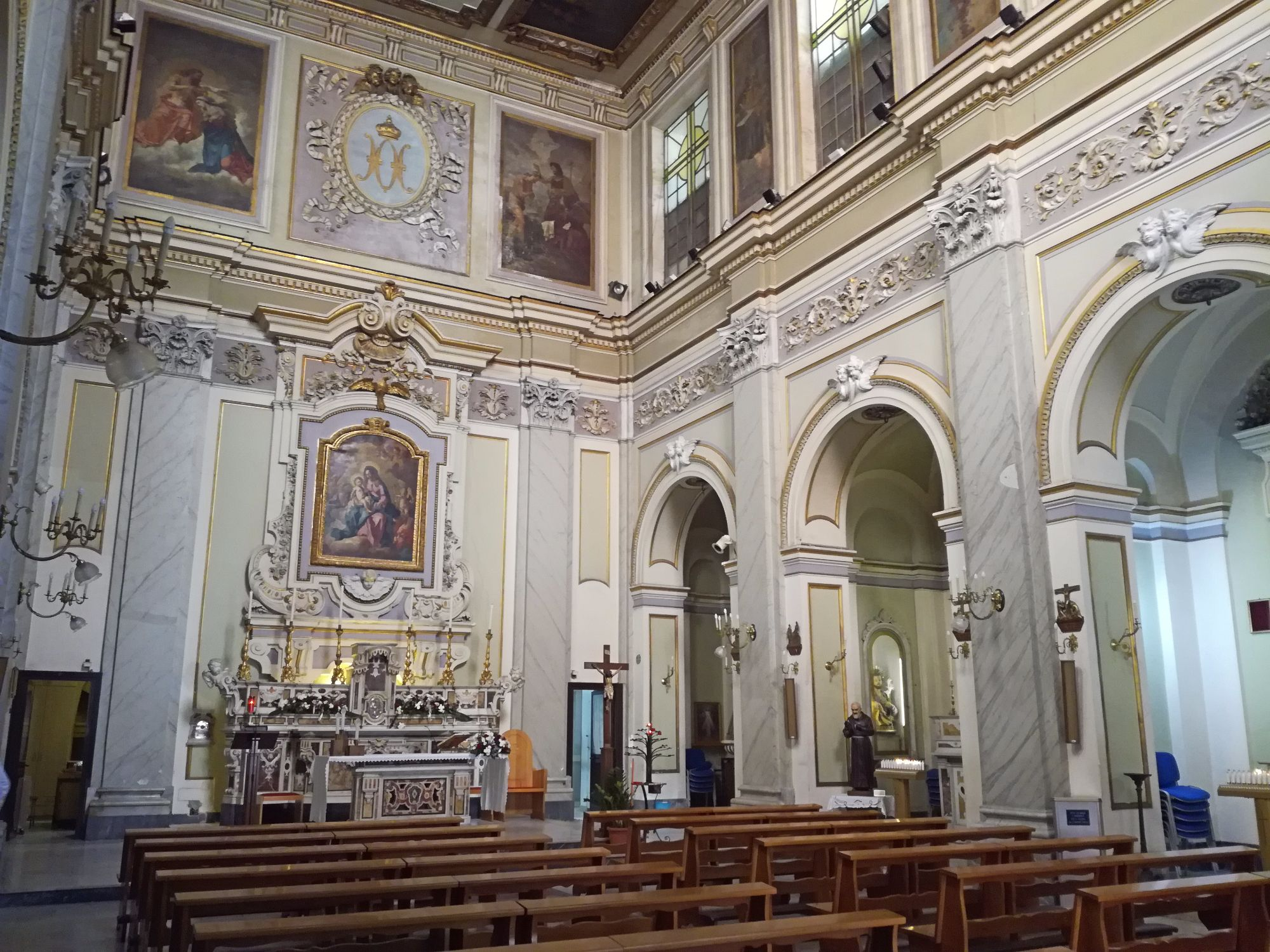
Interior

The complex was built in 1054, when merchants of the town of Scala in the peninsula of Sorrento, traded with Neapolitans, thus were granted a plot which then stood outside the city walls, to erect a church complex. By the 15th century, the church stood inside the walls of the city. As trade between Naples and Scala declined, the church fell in disuse. The church was reconstructed in the 17th and 18th century as the home of various lay and religious confraternities. The interior is decorated in an elaborate Baroque style. In the 19th century, the church was restored by the architect Francesconi. The interior was redecorated by Lorenzo De Caro.

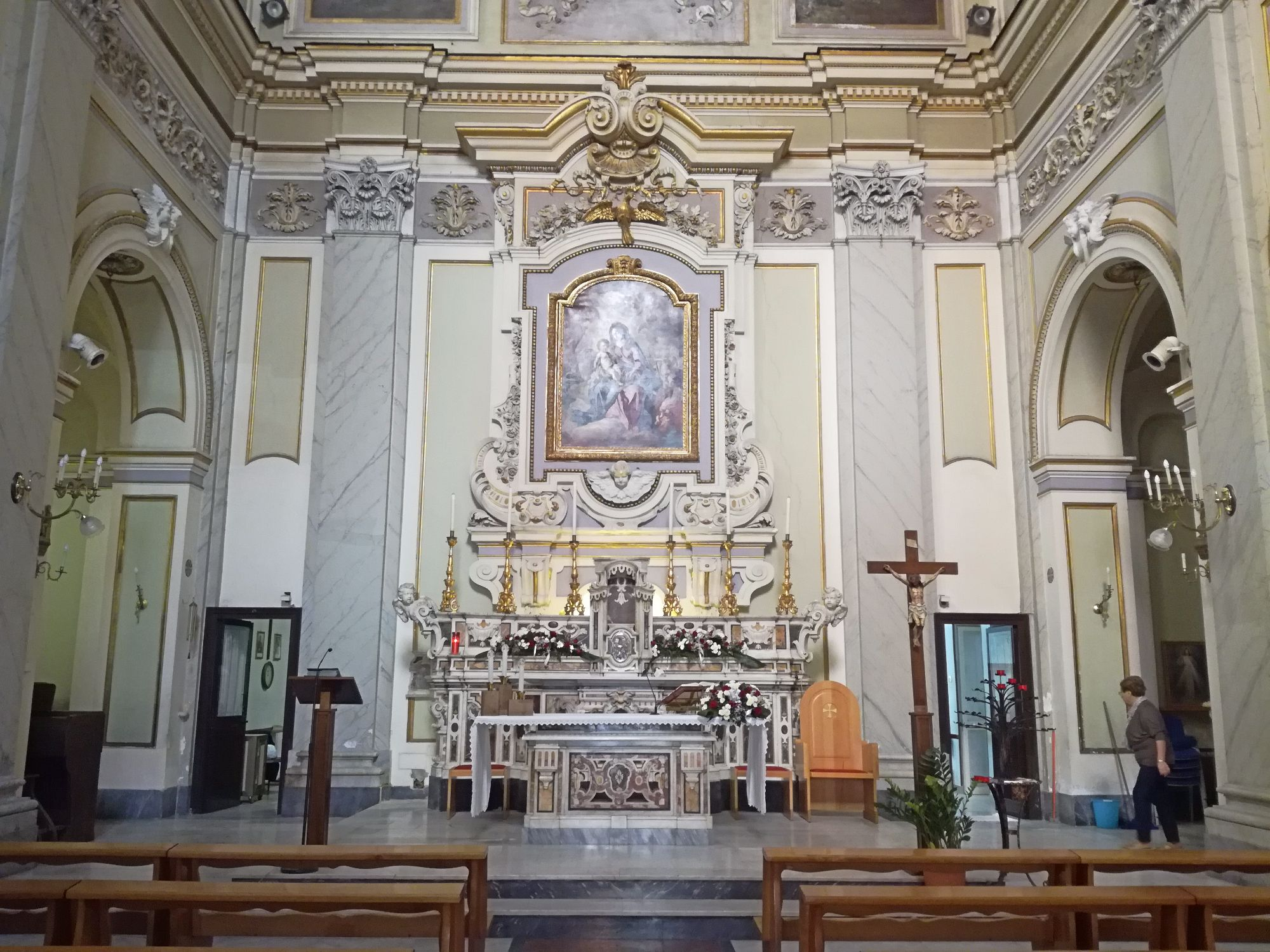
Main altar.

Among those buried in the church are men who were faithful to the Bourbon Monarchy, and who were arrested on June 13, 1799, and the next day executed on the grounds of Capodimonte by a firing squad set up by the Neapolitan Republic of 1799. The executed were Antonio di Lieto, Carloantonio Genovese, Saverio Greco, Carmine Ruggiero, Antonio Russo, and Francesco Vigliotto.

Among the interior decorations are a number of paintings from the school of Solimena. Next to the sacristy is an altarpiece depicting St Matthew by Antonio Pascucci. The canvases in the second and third chapels on the right, depicting Madonnas with Saints Francis and John the Baptist, and with Saints Anthony and Phillip were painted by Nicola de Mattheis. The third chapel also has a canvas depicting the Resurrection by Paolillo, a pupil of Andrea di Salerno. The first chapel on the right has a St Anthony by the school of Massimo Stanzione.

== Bibliography ==
- Luigi Catalani, Le Chiese di Napoli, Naples, Italy, 1845.
- Gennaro Aspreno Galante, Le Chiese di Napoli. Guida Sacra della Città di Napoli, Napoli, XIX secolo.
