= Mario Gioffredo =

Italian architect (1718–1785)

- Born: May 14, 1718; Naples, Kingdom of Naples
- Died: 8 March 1785 (aged 66); Naples, Kingdom of Naples
- Occupation: Architect
- Buildings: Palazzo Partanna, Palazzo di Sangro di Casacalenda, Palazzo Latilla, Santa Caterina da Siena

Mario Gaetano Gioffredo, also called the Neapolitan Vitruvius (14 May 1718 – 8 March 1785), was an Italian Neoclassical architect, engineer, and engraver. In 1783, he was named the Royal architect to the Neapolitan Court. Among his most notable buildings are Palazzo Latilla (1754), Palazzo Cavalcanti (1762), the church of Spirito Santo (1774), and the monasteries of Maria Maddalena and Santa Caterina da Siena.

== Biography ==
=== Early life and education ===
Mario Gioffredo was born and died in Naples. He began his training in 1732 with the architect Martino Buonocore, whose style he later dismissed as ‘Gothic’. However, Buonocore had a good architectural library, in which Gioffredo studied the writings of Palladio, Vitruvius and Vincenzo Scamozzi. During the same period he studied with the painter Francesco Solimena, believing an understanding of the human body to be an essential part of architecture. Gioffredo qualified as an architect in 1741, after being examined by Giovanni Antonio Medrano, one of the kingdom’s engineers.

=== Early career ===
Gioffredo’s architectural knowledge was largely acquired from books and from the direct study of ancient buildings. In the preface to his treatise Dell’architettura (1768) he mentioned several visits to Rome and other places to examine, measure and draw buildings. During one visit to Rome he entered the competition for the façade of Nostra Signora del Sacro Cuore, which he won, beating Ferdinando Fuga and Vanvitelli. However, his design remained unexecuted.

In 1746 he visited Paestum, the first architect to do so; on his return to Naples he reported this to Conte Gazzola, for whom he later measured and drew the three temples. It is possible that he also produced some of the engravings of Paestum for Paolantonio Paoli’s Rovine della città di Pesto (1784).

=== Mature work ===
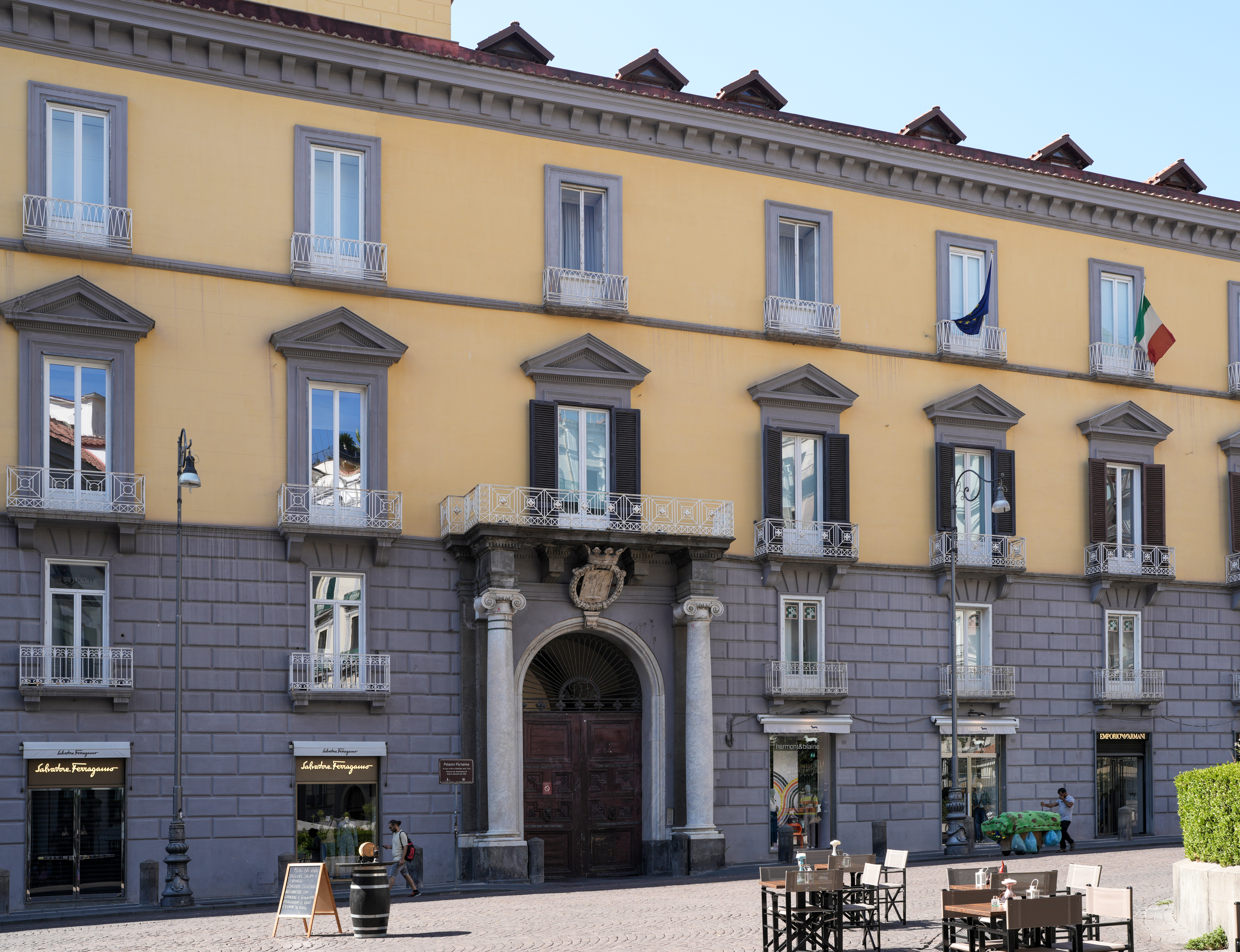
Palazzo Partanna, Naples

Gioffredo’s first major work (1746) was for the Duca di Paduli at the Palazzo Partanna in Naples, and it may have led to his commission to design the new Royal Palace of Caserta, although he was later replaced there by Vanvitelli. The palazzo had a fine doorway flanked by free-standing columns supporting a balcony. It was altered in the 19th century by Antonio Niccolini.

From 1754 Gioffredo was working on the restoration of Saints Marcellino and Festo, Naples, where he broke away from the contemporary Neapolitan fashion for polychromy and inlay. Instead the marble he used was cut so that its natural grain formed symmetrical or regular patterns. His masterpiece, Santo Spirito (1757–74), Naples, was originally built in the early 17th century, and Gioffredo was required to incorporate the arcade of the earlier church into his restoration. His solution was to impose colossal Corinthian columns in front of the nave piers, surmounted by a massive horizontal entablature. Any possible heaviness is offset by the use of plain white stucco throughout the building. He left little room for painted decoration, as he intended the interior to be dominated by the pure abstract decoration of the architecture.

In Dell’architettura Gioffredo propounded that architecture was based on rules that could be deduced from the buildings of the Ancients. This argument was followed by a scathing attack on his contemporaries and the Baroque for the ways in which they contorted and misused Classical elements. He believed there was an infinite number of designs laid down by the Ancients and therefore no need to resort to capricious and strange details or ideals. Even in his treatise, however, the engravings of the orders are still not strictly conventional, with masks and swags introduced into the Ionic order. Only the first part of the work, containing Gioffredo’s exposition of the orders, was published; the other two parts would have covered the use of the orders in religious, civil and private buildings.

Despite his staunch belief in the ultimate authority of the Ancients and the five orders, Gioffredo’s roots were firmly in the Baroque tradition, as his work at Santa Caterina da Siena, Naples, illustrates. The strictly classical interior contrasts with the open porch, which is essentially Baroque in character, with its rounded corners and flowing lines.

== Writings ==
- Gioffredo, Mario (1768). Dell’architettura. Vol. 1. Naples.

== Select works ==
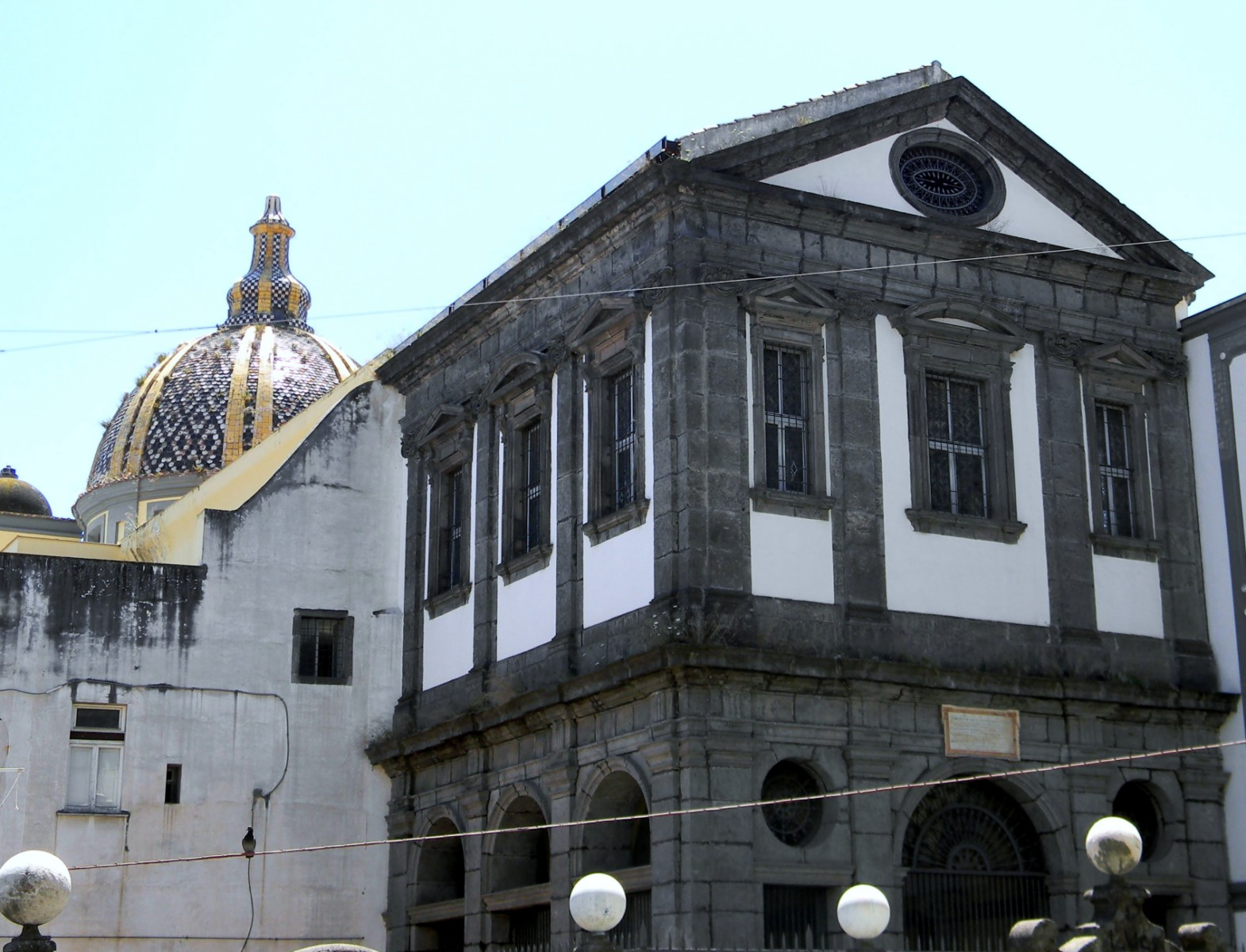
Santi Marcellino and Festo, Naples, 1757–74

- Palazzo Partanna in Naples (1746)
- Saints Marcellino and Festo in Naples (1754)
- Santo Spirito in Naples (1757–74)
- Maria Santissima del Carmine, Vasto
- Palazzo Genovese, Salerno
- Palazzo Latilla, Naples
- Santa Caterina da Siena, Naples
- Palazzo di Sangro di Casacalenda, Naples
- Villa Campolieto, Naples (together with Luigi Vanvitelli)
- Palazzo Cavalcanti, Naples
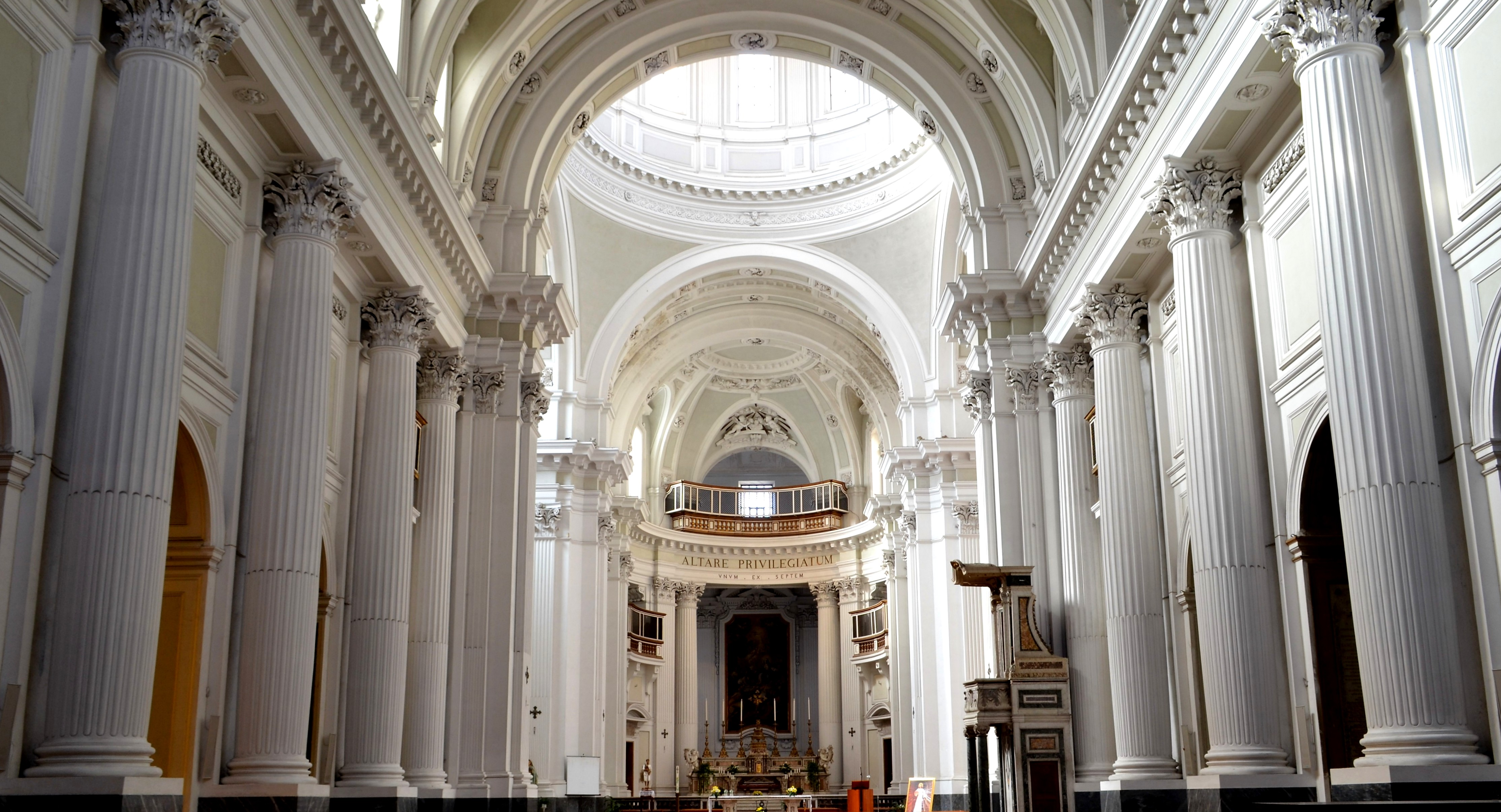
Interior of Santo Spirito, Naples

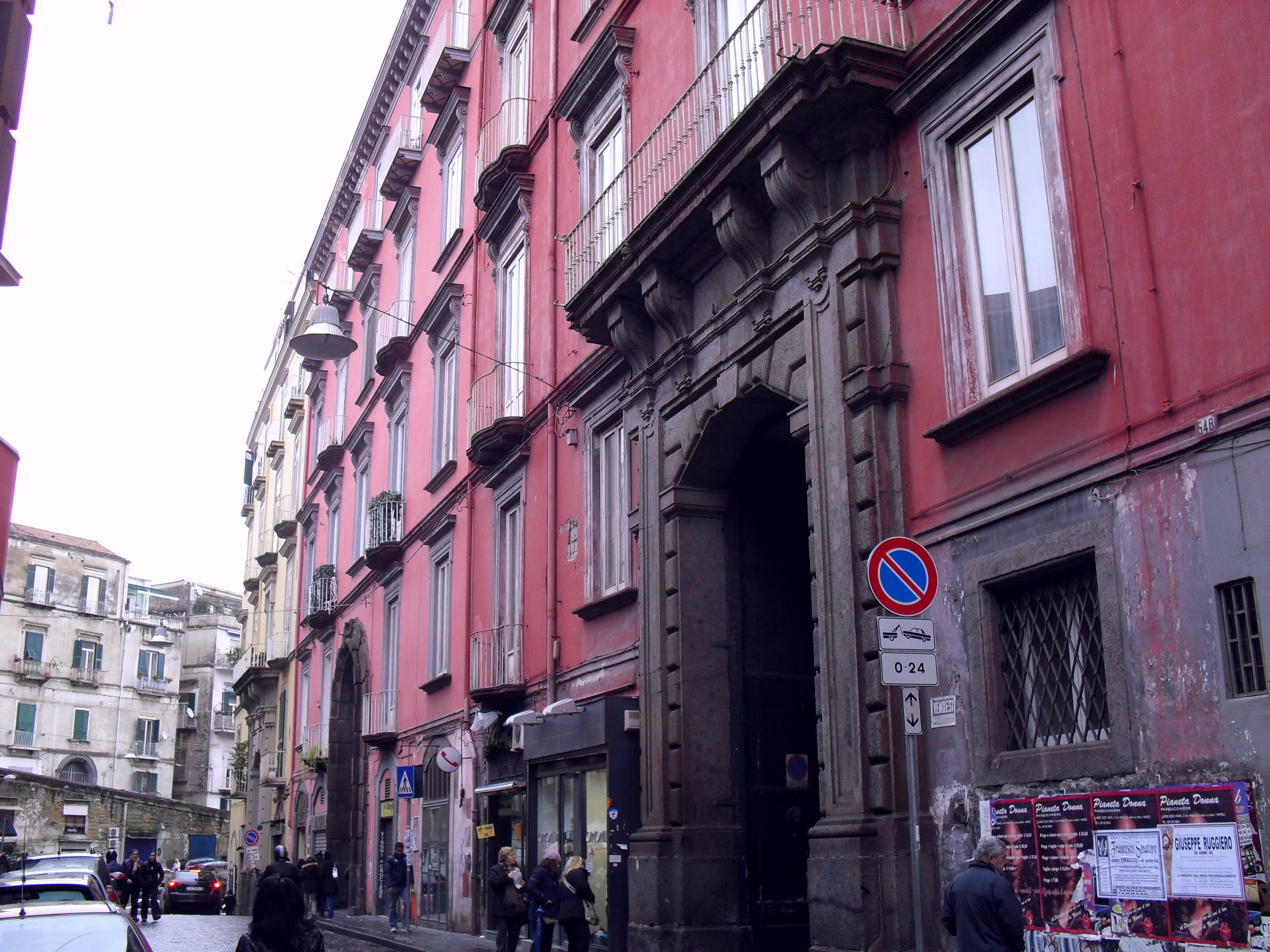
Palazzo Latilla, Naples

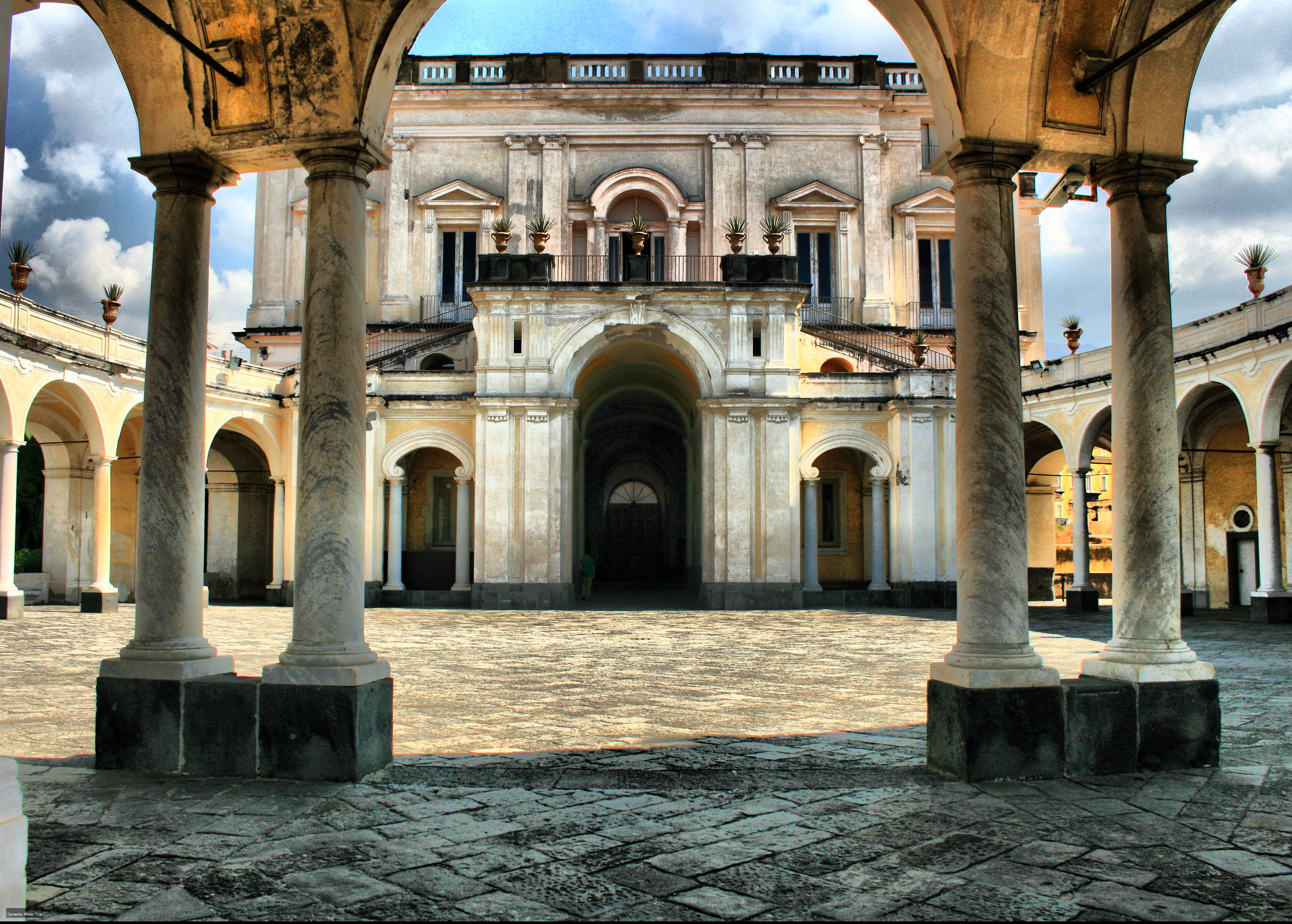
Villa Campolieto, Naples

== Bibliography ==
- Napoli Signorelli, Pietro (1811). Vicende della coltura nelle due Sicilie. Vol. II (2nd ed.). Naples: Vincenzo Orsini.
- Sasso, Camillo Napoleone (1856). Storia de' monumenti di Napoli e degli architetti. Vol. 1. Naples: tip. F. Vitale.
- Venditti, Mauro (2000). "GIOFFREDO, Mario". Dizionario Biografico degli Italiani (in Italian). Vol. 55: Ginammi–Giovanni da Crema. Rome: Istituto dell'Enciclopedia Italiana. ISBN 978-88-12-00032-6.
