= Palazzo di Sangro di Casacalenda, Naples =

Coordinates: 40.848964°N 14.254808°E

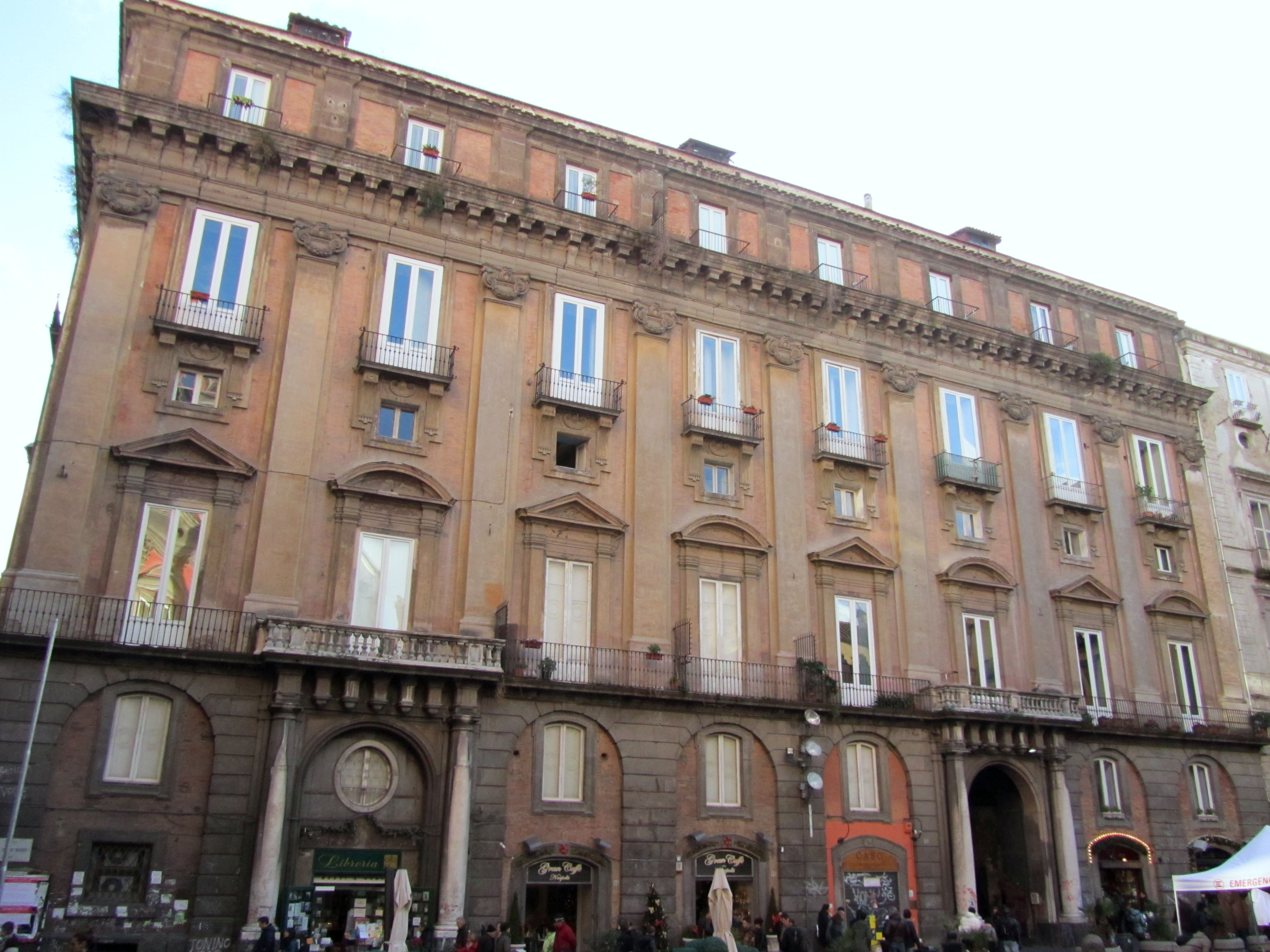
Palace facade.

The Palazzo di Sangro di Casacalenda is an 18th-century aristocratic palace located across a piazza from the church of San Domenico Maggiore in central Naples, region of Campania, Italy. The East flank of the facade faces the facade of the church of Sant'Angelo a Nilo.

== History ==
The initial design was made reputedly by Cosimo Fanzago in the late 16th century. In 1754–1762, the architects Mario Gioffredo and later Luigi Vanvitelli refurbished the palace as we mainly see it today, for the Duchess Marianna de Sangro di Casacalenda. It is said that during this construction, the Byzantine-era church of Santa Maria della Rotonda was demolished. That church putatively had been erected by Emperor Constantine atop a temple of Vesta. The columns of the temple are now in use in the courtyard. The design of monumental pilasters of the top floors of the facade are attributed to Mario Gioffredo. In 1831, the palace was sold by the Sangro family to the Del Balzo family

In 1922, as part of the urban renewal of Naples and to widen Via Mezzocannone, the easternmost bay of the palace was demolished, requiring the removal of frescoes from this part of the piano nobile. The frescoes were relocated to the Museum of Capodimonte.

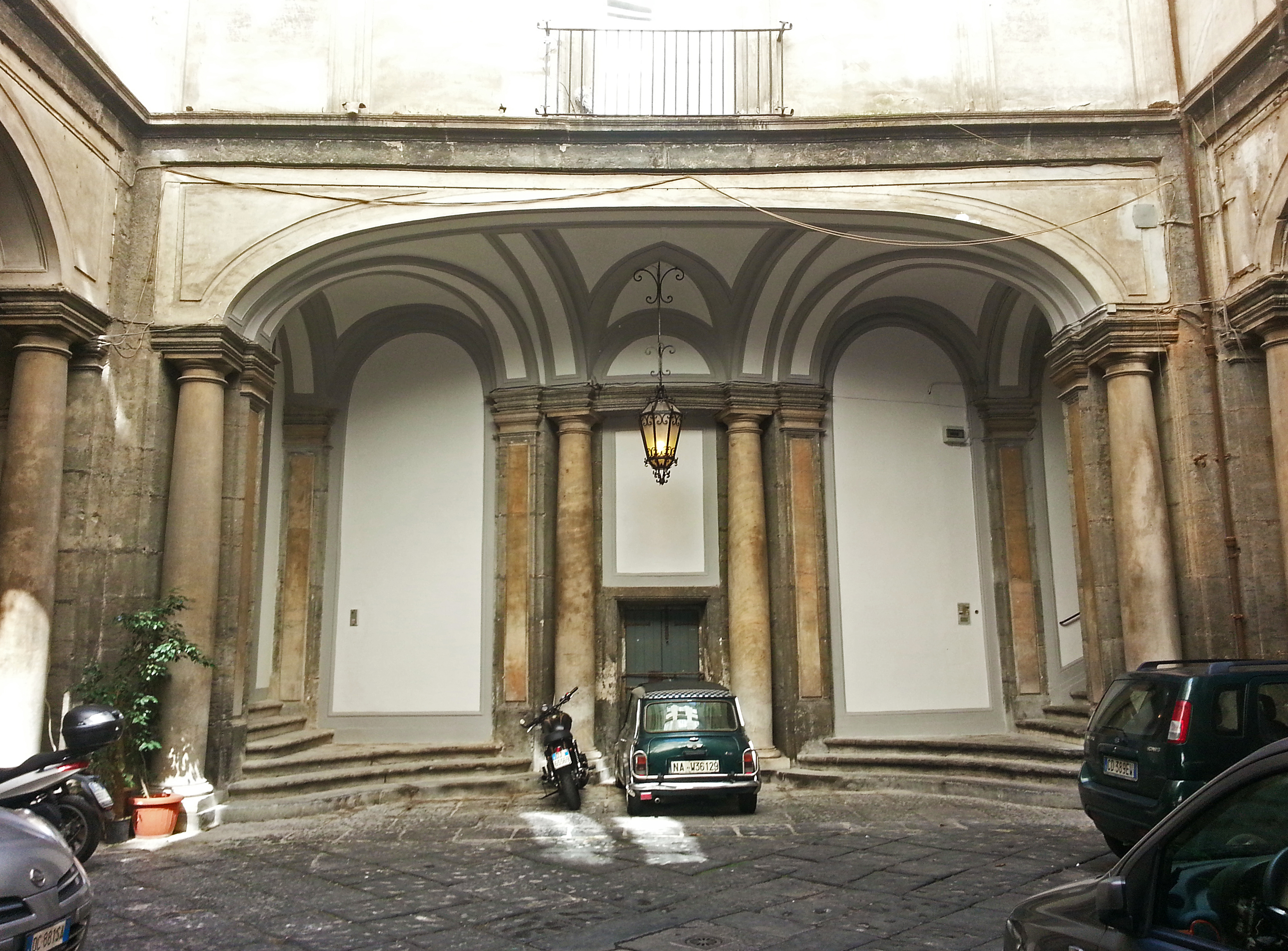
Courtyard

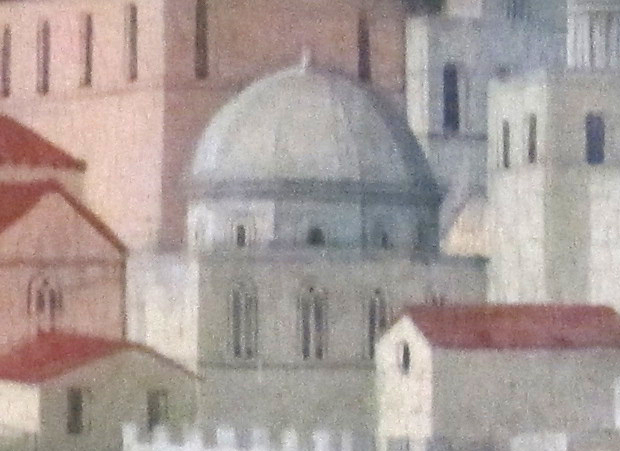
Alleged depiction of Santa Maria della Rotonda on Tavola Strozzi
