= Palazzo Latilla, Naples =

Coordinates: 40.8481°N 14.2477°E

The Palazzo Latilla is an 18th-century monumental palace located at Via Tarsia #28, in the neighborhood of Avvocata in Naples, Italy.

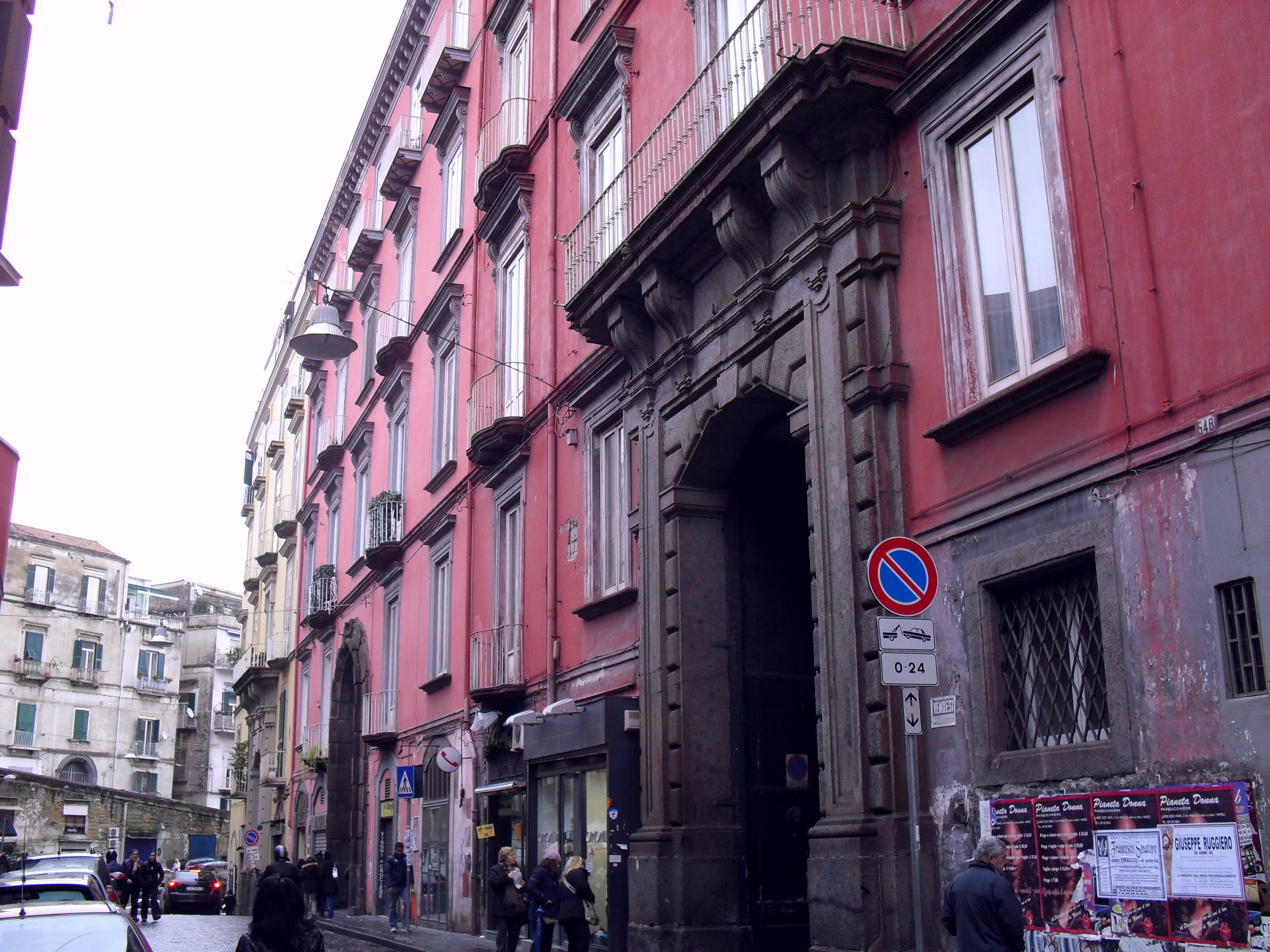
Facade of Palace

== History ==
The palace was constructed (1758–1761) by fusing three adjacent houses previously on the site. The design was by Mario Gioffredo, and the structure was built for the municipal councilman Ferdinando Latilla. The front exterior had a massive stone portal leading into a small inner courtyard with stairs. In 1988, it became property of the Faculty of Architecture, and used for classrooms and offices, of the MAED-Materioteca per l’Architettura e il Design (Materioteca for Architecture and Design), the Centro CITTAM, and the Centro Urban/Eco.
