= Piazza dei Martiri, Naples =

Coordinates: 40.8342°N 14.2418°E

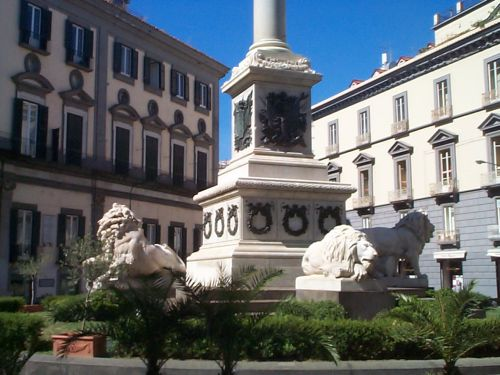
Piazza dei Martiri in Naples.

Piazza dei Martiri (in Italian: Martyrs' Square) is a monument-containing square in Naples, Italy, located at the junction of Via Domenico Morelli and Santa Caterina, one block north of the eastern end of the large seaside park known as the Villa Comunale. The square was originally dedicated to Santa Maria a Cappella, but took on patriotic significance when Italy was united in 1861.

== Monument to the Martyrs ==
The monument in the center of this square was built around a column already standing during the Bourbon rule, when the square was called the Piazza della Pace. The column was repurposed, and atop now stands a bronze statue depicting the Virtue of the Martyrs, designed by Emanuele Caggiano. Four lions stand at the corners of the square base, each represent Neapolitan patriots who died during specific anti-Bourbon revolutions

- Lion dying - to fallen defending the short lived Parthenopean Republic in 1799.
- Lion pierced by a sword- to fallen during Carbonari revolution of 1820.
- Lion lying down - to fallen during revolution of 1848, with 1848 statutes under paw.
- Lion striding on foot - to fallen during successful Garibaldini Revolt of 1860.

Behind this last lion is a tablet that states:

To the glorious memory of the Neapolitan citizens who
died in the struggles or scaffold
revindicated for the people with solemn and eternal covenant the freedom to proclaim
the plebiscite of October 21, 1860
The City Hall Consecrates

Lions at base of monument

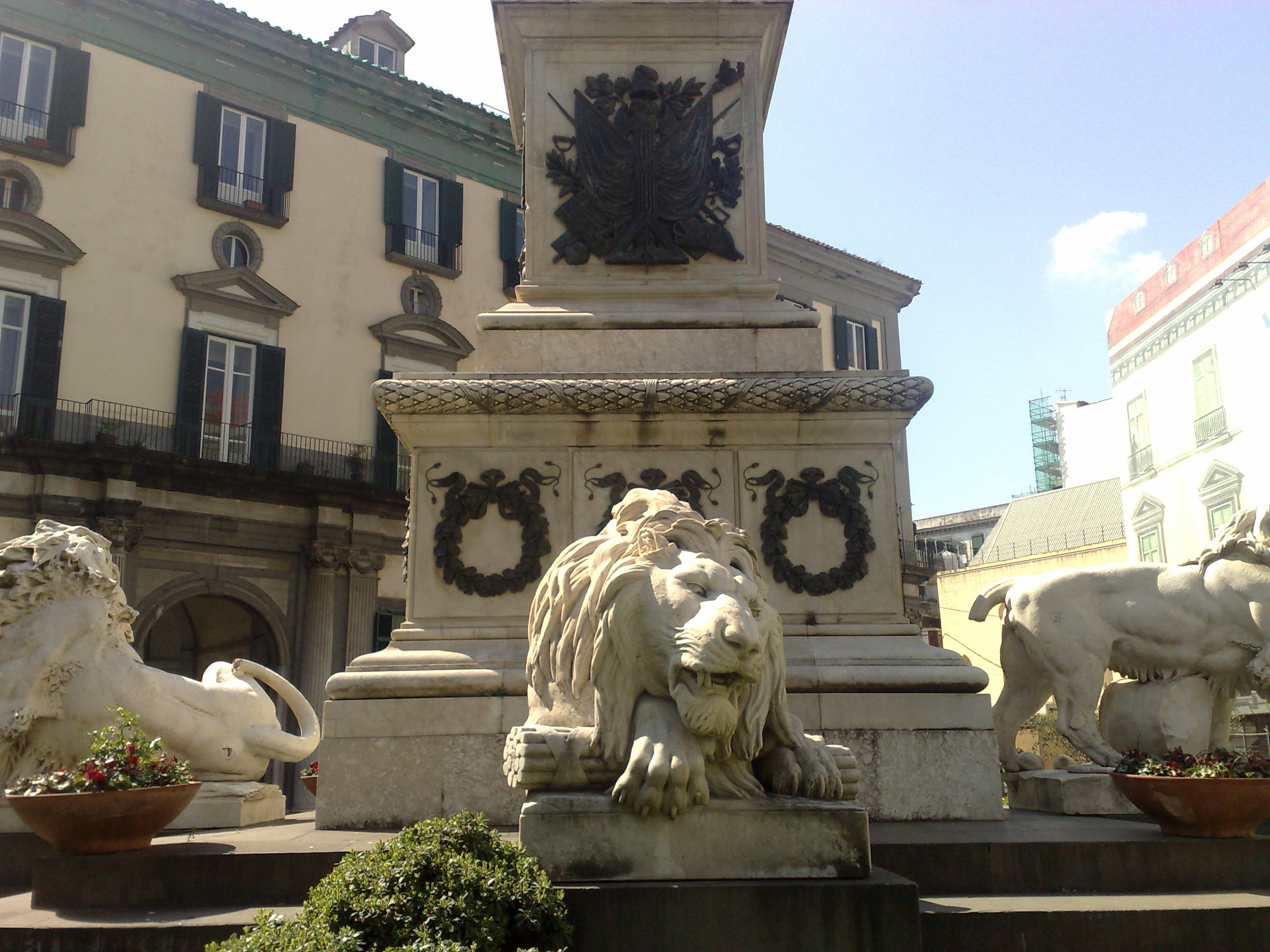
To fallen in 1799

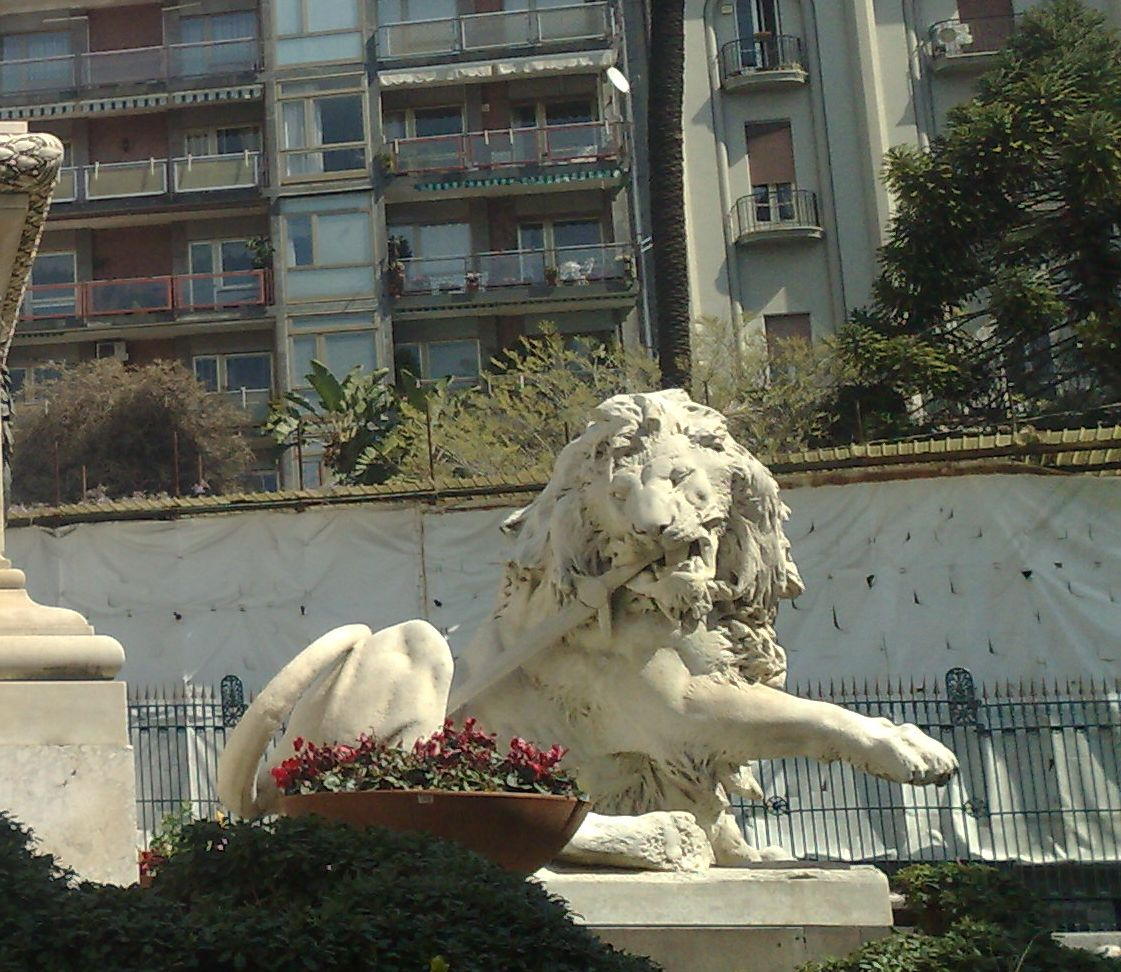
To fallen in 1820

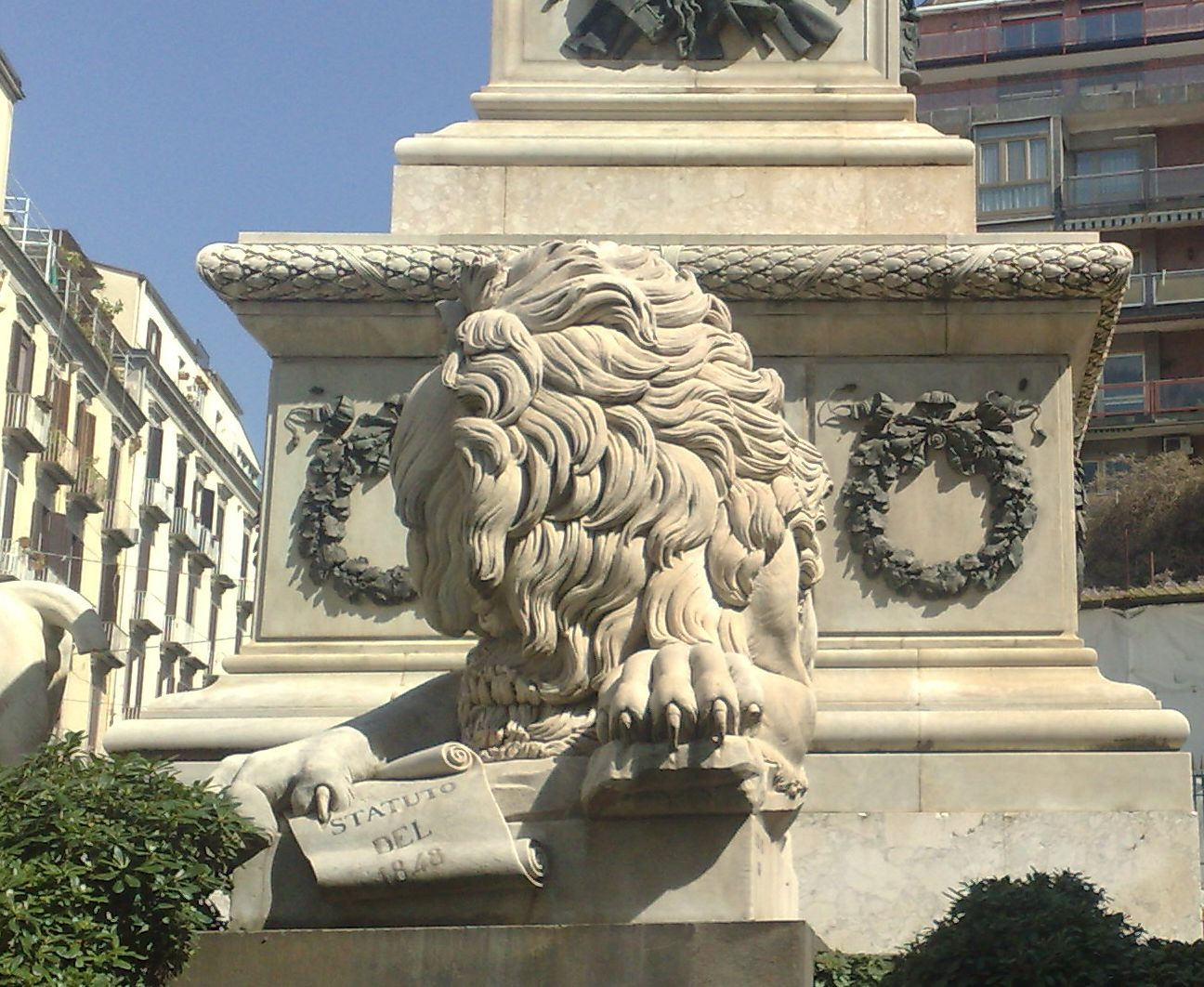
To fallen in 1848

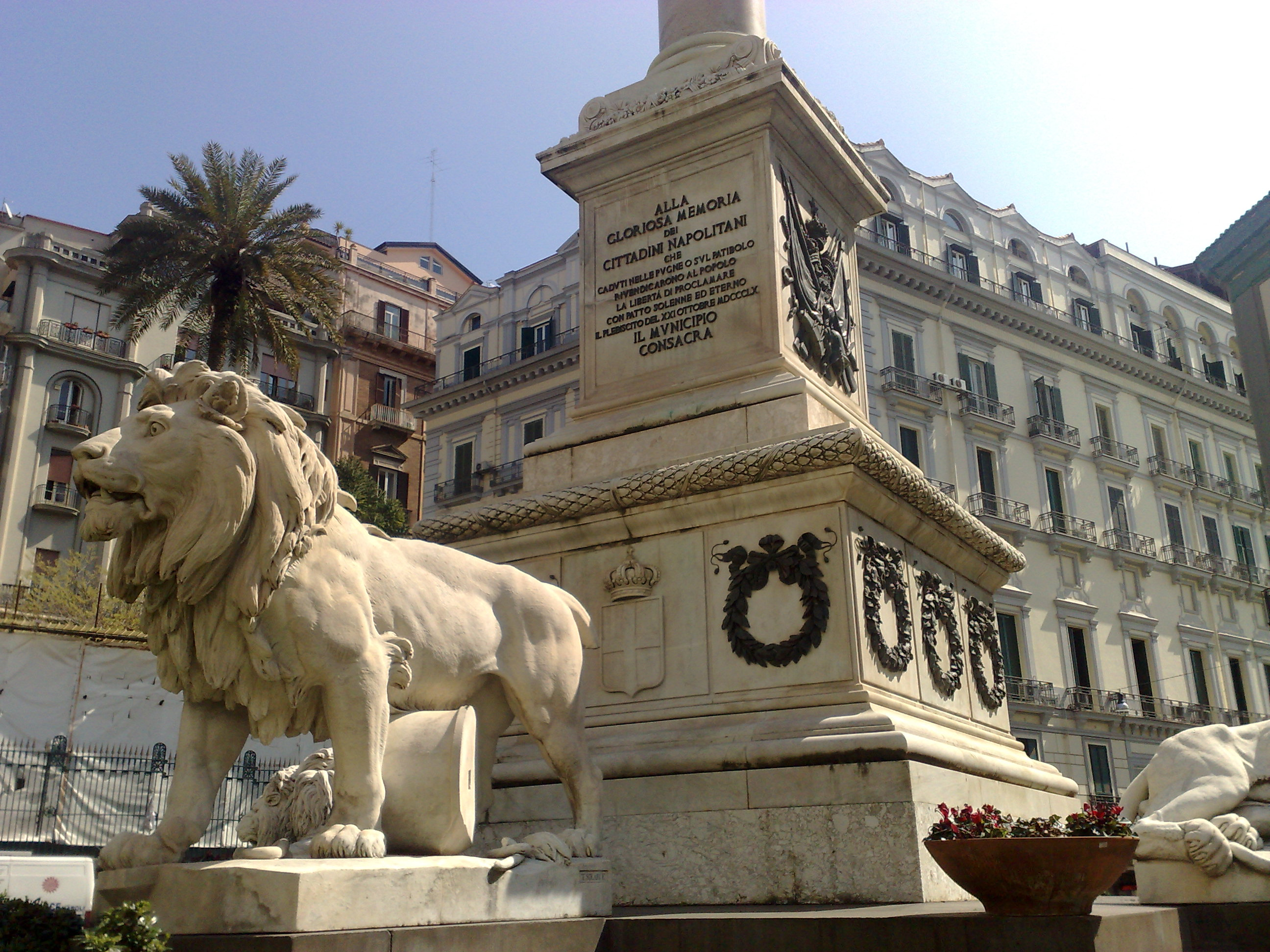
To fallen in 1860
