= Emanuele Caggiano =

Italian sculptor

Emanuele Caggiano (Benevento, June 12, 1837 – Naples, August 22, 1905) was an Italian sculptor, active in a Realist style.

== Biography ==
He began his training early, and by the age of 12 years he had completed in Bari a portrait of Count Candido Gonzaga, and he had garnered from the province a stipend, with which he was able to travel to Naples by 1859. That year, in a public contest in Naples, he submitted a bas-relief depicting: The Cimbrian tries to murder Marius, and for this work, he received a pension from the state. He then traveled to Florence to work in the studio of Giovanni Duprè, and as an essay required by his scholarship, he completed the stucco statue of Pane e Lavoro (Bread and Work). Prince Oddone of Savoy had it translated into marble, and transferred to Capodimonte Museum. Caggiano made another copy for signor Giuseppe Budillon; this copy garnered an honorable mention at the Salon at Paris and a medal at the London Exhibition. For signor Budillon, He completed two figures depicting Frinè (Phryne, the putative model of Praxiteles), and in 1862, in a contest held by the City of Naples, he designed a larger than life (96 inches tall) statue of bronze, intended to be gilded, depicting Victory to stand atop the monument in Piazza dei Martiri, Naples. He also completed a statue of Pliny the Elder, a monument to the Bucci family, and others.

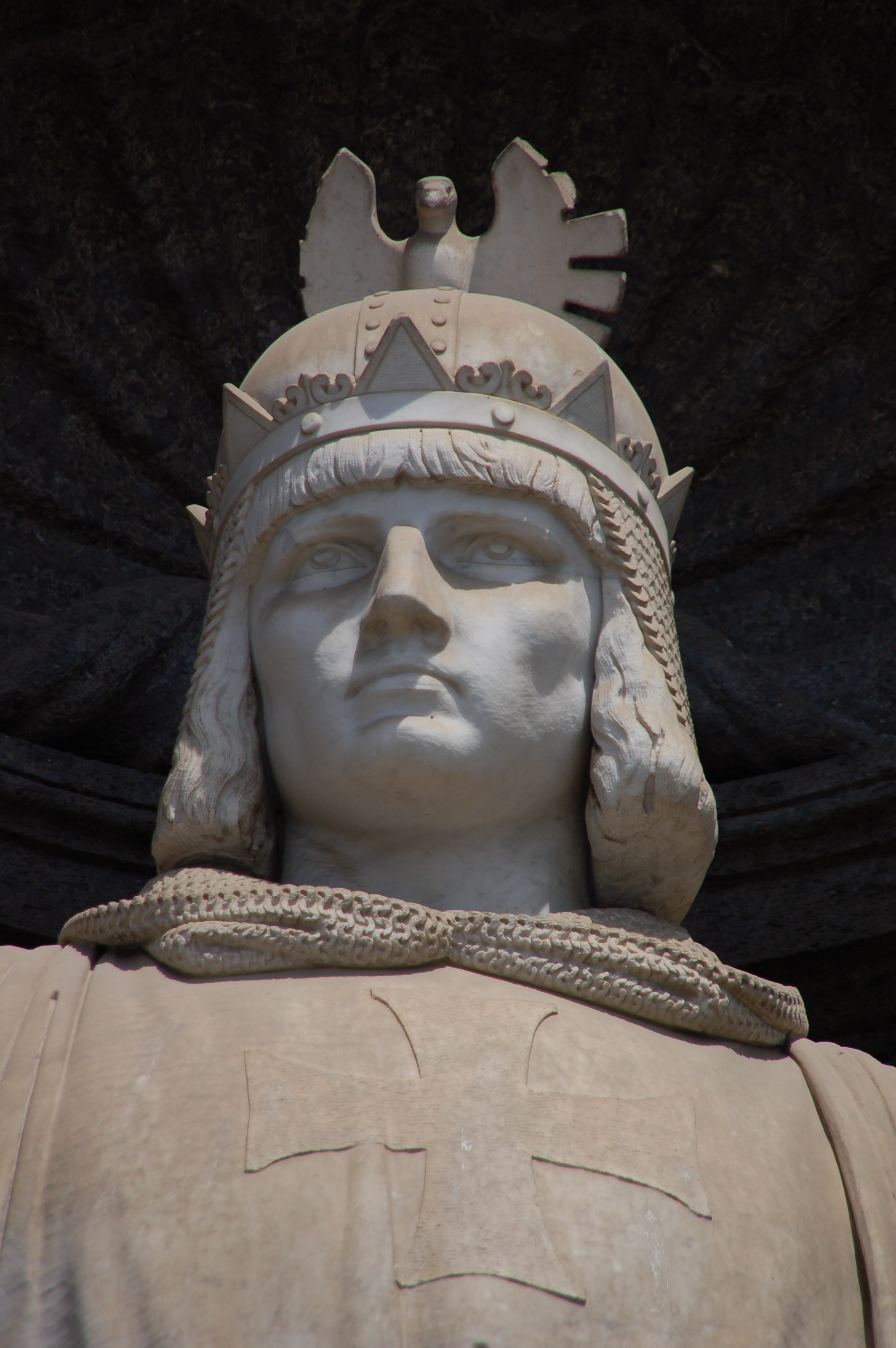
Frederick of Swabia on facade of Royal Palace of Naples

In 1879, he wins a competition to become professor of sculpture in the Royal Institute of Fine Arts, by modeling in clay a bas relief depicting Hector, consecrating his son to Jove before sallying against Greeks. In 1877, the royal house commissioned a statue of Frederick II of Swabia, one of eight rulers of Naples, for the facade of the Reggia of Naples. He also designed two bronze busts of Giulio Bucci and Emanuele De Deo. He also completed a few paintings, including a Magdalen.
