= Santa Caterina da Siena, Naples =

Roman Catholic church in Naples, Italy

Coordinates: 40.839150°N 14.242866°E

The church of Santa Caterina da Siena is located in the city center of Naples, Italy, and while built in the 16th century, the interior was decorated by Baroque era artists over the next two centuries.

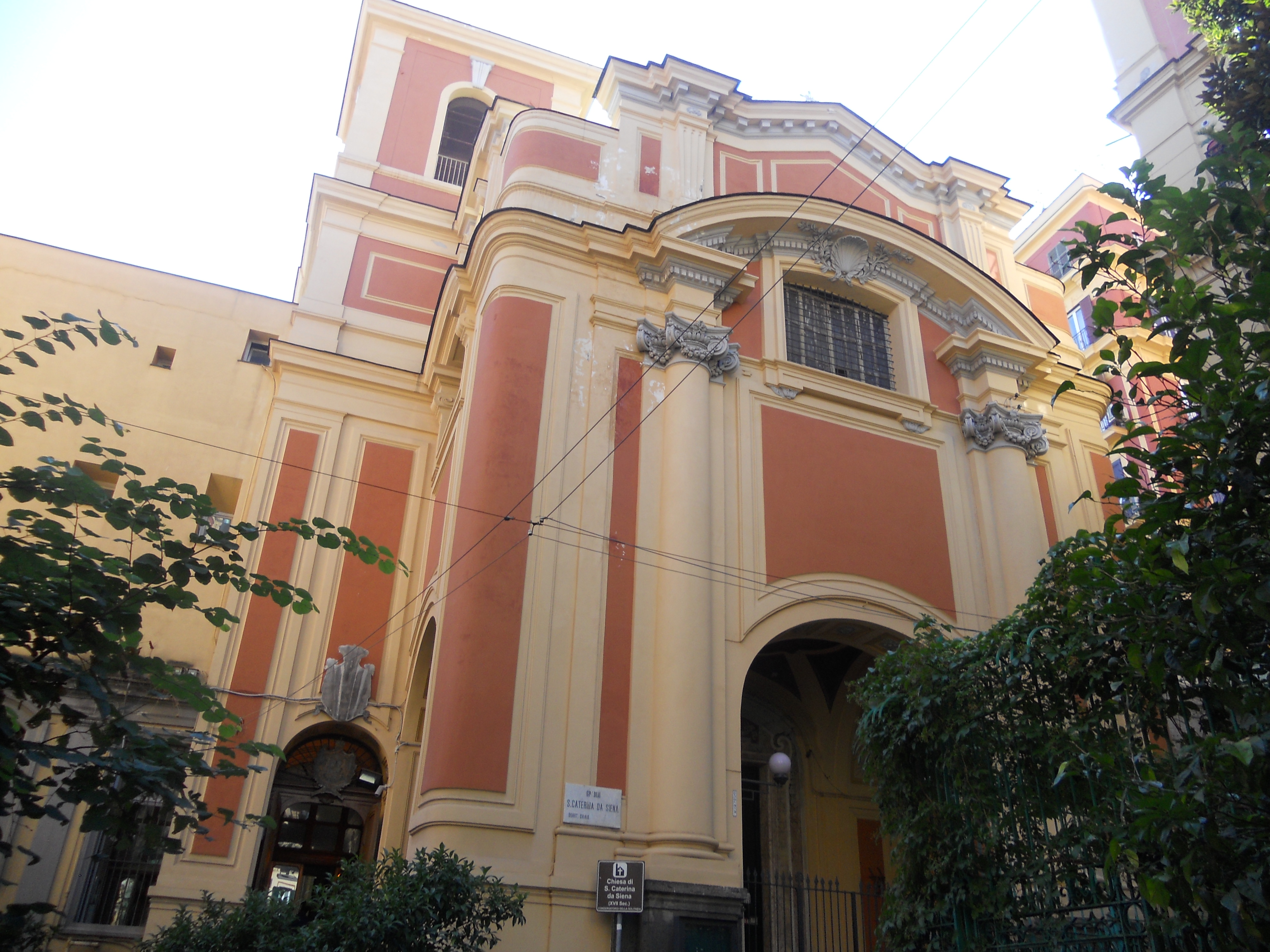
Façade of church

== History ==
The church building was commissioned in the 1570s by Don John of Austria, the victorious admiral during the Battle of Lepanto. It was attached to a nearby hospital of Santa Maria della Vittoria, then later to the hospital of San Giacomo. In 1613, the church was transferred to the Dominican Order, who established a nearby cloistered monastery. At present, the church is owned by the Archdiocese of Naples who lets a private non-profit music Foundation, the Centro di Musica Antica Pietà de' Turchini, founded in 1997 to highlight performances and research of Neapolitan 16th-18th century musical and theatrical works.

== Description ==
The interior contains a holy water font attributed to the studio of Cosimo Fanzago. In 1760, the floor was decorated in maiolica tiles. In 1766, the ceiling was frescoed by Vincenzo Diano with the Glorification of the Church (1784). The nave ceiling was painted by Fedele Fischetti, depicting a Glory of Saint Catherine, and in the tribune, God the Father and the Evangelists, and in the lunettes above the altar, the Cardinal and Theologic virtues. The main altarpiece depicts the Mystical Marriage of St Catherine by Lorenzo De Caro.

There are a number of chapels. The first chapel on the right has an altarpiece depicting St Augustine by Francesco De Mura. The second chapel on the right has an altarpiece depicting Calvary (1782) by Giacinto Diana. The third chapel on the right has frescoes by Fedele Fischetti, as well as an altarpiece depicting the Circumcision of Christ. The first chapel on the left has canvases by Fischetti, including the Virgin, Magadalen, and St Catherine Hold a Drape for the Miracle of the Painting of Soriano and a Noli me tangere. The second chapel on the left has an altarpiece depicting a Madonna del Rosario by De Mura.

== See also ==
- Churches in Naples
