= Finarte =

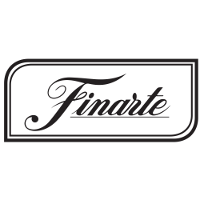
- Company type: Public
- Industry: Auctioneering
- Founded: Milan, Italy(1959)
- Founder: Gian Marco Manusardi
- Headquarters: Milan
- Products: Fine arts
- Revenue: EUR 19.4 million ($28 million) in 2006
- Divisions: Finarte Milano; Finarte Roma; Finarte Venezia
- Website: Finarte.com

Finarte is an Italian auction house based in Milan. It is one of the most renowned auction houses in Italy with great importance on the international market. It went bankrupt in fall 2011, though it has been relaunched in 2014, with the backing of Italian investors.

Besides offering financial services in every art field, it provides consultancies in sales, private funding, pre-fundings, extensions on acquisitions, sales on commercial portfolios and heritage administration.

Finarte has been listed on the Milan Stock Exchange from 1970.

It has operational bases in Milan, Rome and Venice.

== History ==
Finarte was founded by an Italian banker, Gian Marco Manusardi, in Milan in 1959.

The aim was to assist collectioners and operators in the purchase and sales of art works. Finarte became a pioneer in the provision of financial services and products including sales advances, loans using art as collateral, and hire-purchase financing.

Finarte was the first firm in the world to operate financings in a field that did not have credit near the banking institutions.

The company also has joint-venture auction operations in Spain and Switzerland, and is part of the Italian National Association of Auction Houses .

== Strategy ==
Finarte auction house has chosen a precise strategy: to organize specific auctions for specific kind of objects. There are a lot of sections which include silverware, jewels and watches, books and printings, old furniture, majolica and porcelain objects, carpets and textiles. Finarte also deals with modern and contemporary art without neglecting paintings of the 19th century.
