= Santi Filippo e Giacomo, Naples =

Church in Naples, Italy

Church of Santi Filippo e Giacomo
- Chiesa dei Santi Filippo e Giacomo
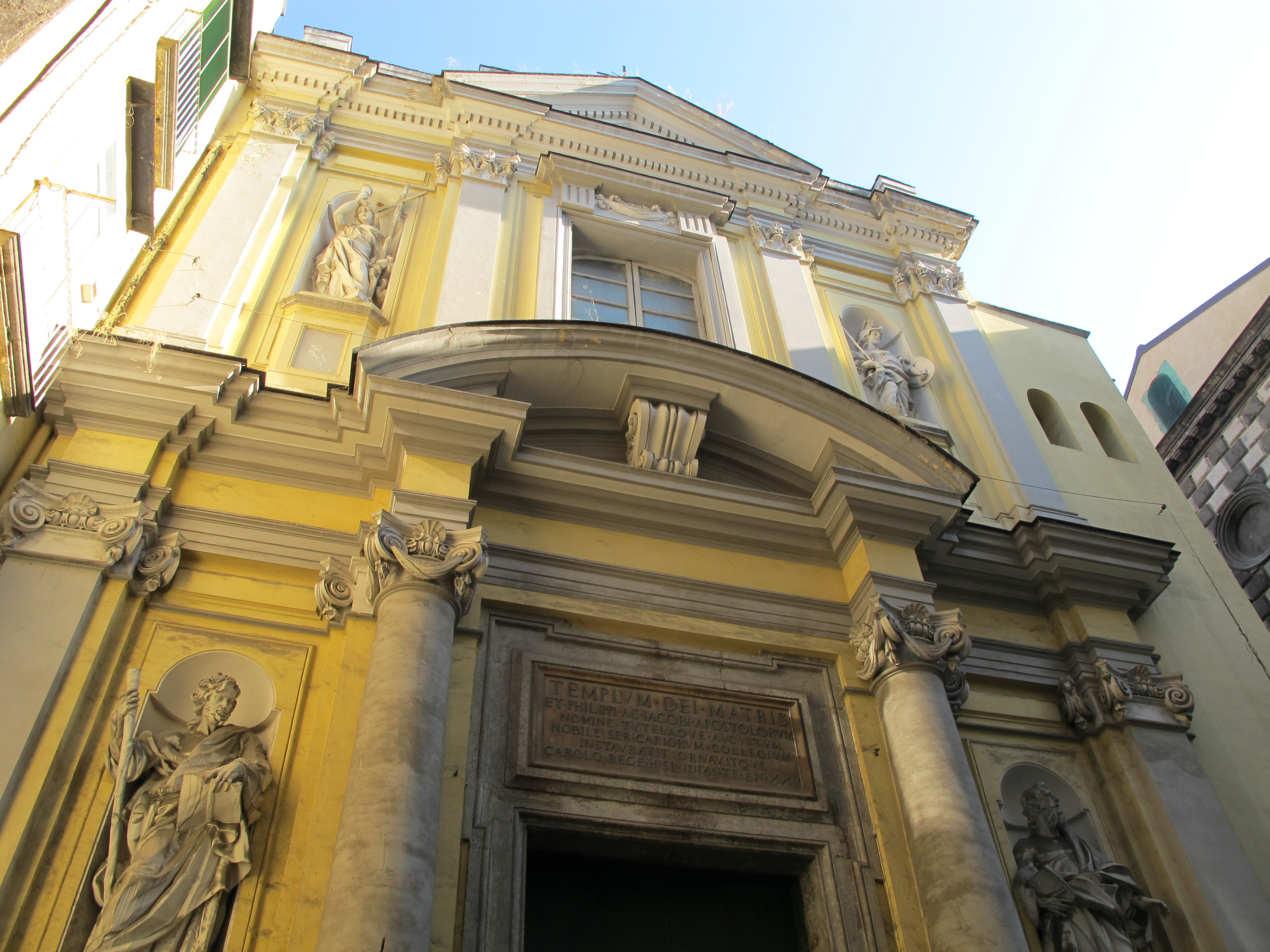
- Façade
- Church of Santi Filippo e Giacomo
- 40.848860°N 14.257160°E
- Location: Via San Biagio dei Librai; Naples; Province of Naples, Campania
- Country: Italy
- Denomination: Roman Catholic

History
- Status: Active

Architecture
- Architectural type: Church
- Style: Baroque architecture
- Groundbreaking: 1593
- Completed: 1758

Administration
- Diocese: Roman Catholic Archdiocese of Naples

Santi Filippo e Giacomo is a Renaissance-style, Roman Catholic church in Naples, Italy, located on Via San Biagio dei Librai, near the churches of San Biagio Maggiore and Santa Luciella.

In 1593, the church was commissioned by local merchants and tradesman in the zone. The church we see today is the product of a 1758 reconstruction by Gennaro Papa. The concave/convex facade recalls the style of Borromini; and the top level niches hold statues of Religion and Faith by Giuseppe Picano, while the lower level has statues of St Phillip and St James by Giuseppe Sanmartino. The pavement was designed by Giuseppe Massa, and the holy water fonts by Domenico Antonio Vaccaro. The frescoes in the choir, nave and walls were completed by Jacopo Cestaro. He also painted the Evangelists on the cupola and St Phillip and Jacob in the presbytery.

== Gallery ==
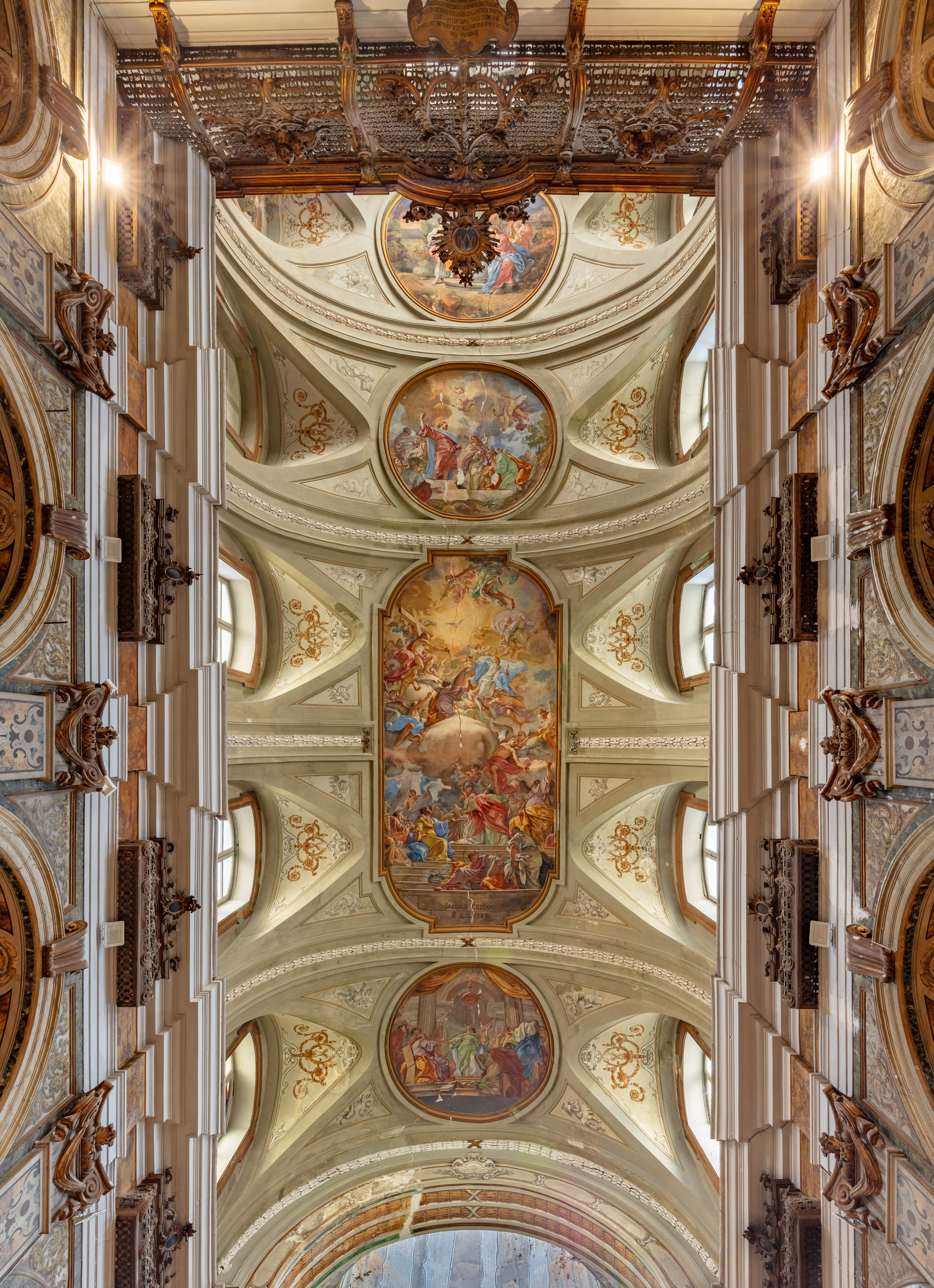
Frescoes by Cestaro on nave ceiling

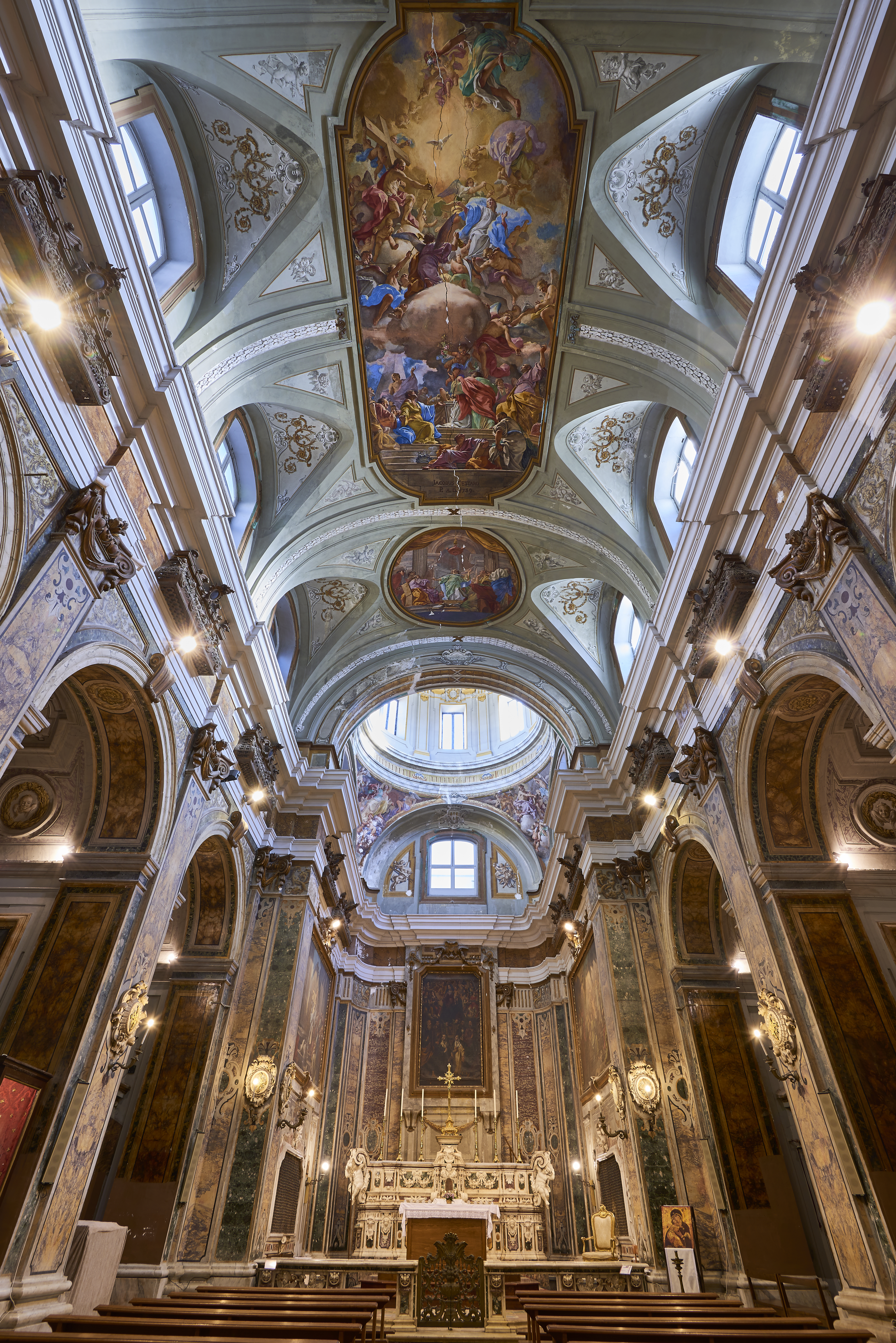
Interior

== Bibliography ==
- Vincenzo Regina, Le chiese di Napoli. Viaggio indimenticabile attraverso la storia artistica, architettonica, letteraria, civile e spirituale della Napoli sacra, Newton and Compton editor, Naples 2004.
