= Picano =

Picano is a surname. Notable people with the surname include:

- Felice Picano (born 1944), American writer, publisher, and critic
- Giuseppe Picano (1716–1810), Italian sculptor
