= Spaccanapoli (street) =

Street in Naples, Italy

Coordinates: 40°50′N 14°15′E

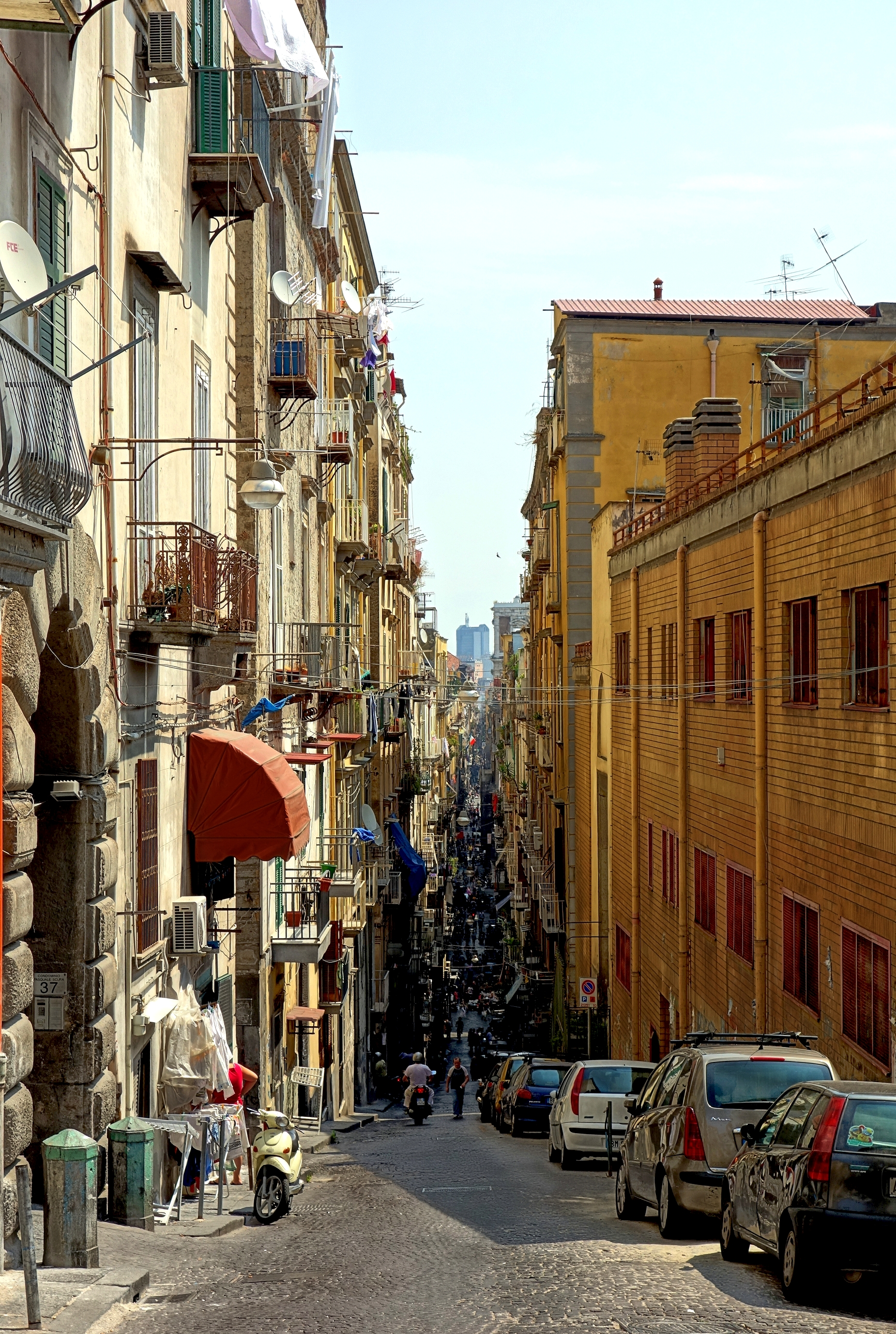
- Interactive map of Spaccanapoli
- Length: 2 km (1.2 mi)
- Location: Naples, Campania, Italy

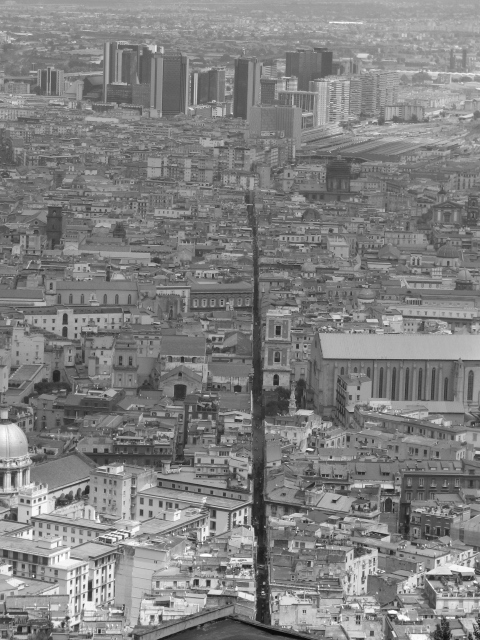
View of Spaccanapoli from Largo San Martino on Vomero

Spaccanapoli is the straight and narrow main street that traverses the old, historic center of the city of Naples, Italy. The name is a popular usage and means, literally, "Naples splitter". The name is derived from the fact that it is very long and from above it seems to divide that part of the city.

This street is the lower (Decumanus Inferiore) and southernmost of the three decumani, or east-west streets, of the grid of the original Greco-Roman city of Neapolis. The central main Decumanus Maggiore is now Via dei Tribunali; while the northernmost or upper Decumanus Superiore is now via Anticaglia and Via della Sapienza. The three decumani were (and still are) intersected by numerous north-south cross-streets called cardini, together forming the grid of the ancient city.

Today, the street officially starts at Piazza Gesù Nuovo and is officially named Via Benedetto Croce. Moving east, the street changes name to Via S. Biagio dei Librai and then crosses Via Duomo (named for the Cathedral of Naples) and moves beyond the confines of the old center of town.

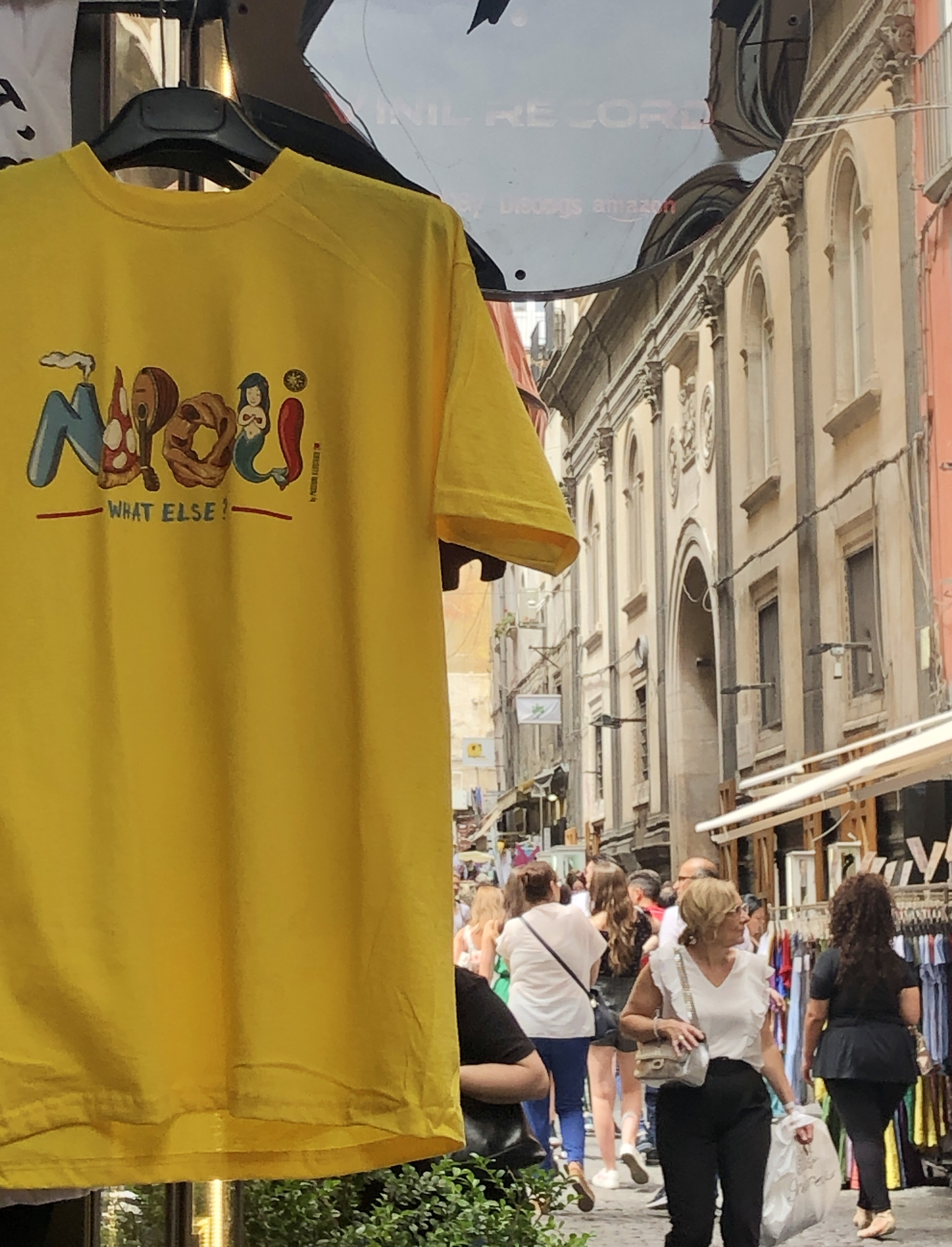
Tourists in Spaccanapoli

Spaccanapoli is the main promenade for tourists as it provides access to a number of important sights of the city. These include:

- Santa Chiara
- Santa Marta
- San Biagio Maggiore
- Santi Filippo e Giacomo
- San Francesco delle Monache
- San Domenico Maggiore
- Palazzo Venezia
- Palazzo Petrucci
- Palazzo Pinelli
- Palazzo Carafa della Spina
- Palazzo del Panormita
- Palazzo Filomarino della Rocca
- Palazzo di Sangro
- Palazzo di Sangro di Casacalenda
- Palazzo Marigliano
- Piazzetta Nilo with the Nile God statue
- Palazzo of Monte di Pietà, Naples
- Palazzo Zuroli seu Zurolo
