= Santa Marta, Naples =

Church in Naples, Italy

Coordinates: 40.847631°N 14.252748°E

Santa Marta is a Roman Catholic church located on Via Benedetto Croce (part of Spaccanapoli, in central Naples, Italy. It is located parallel to the convent of Santa Chiara, and stands in front of the Palazzo Filomarino della Rocca.

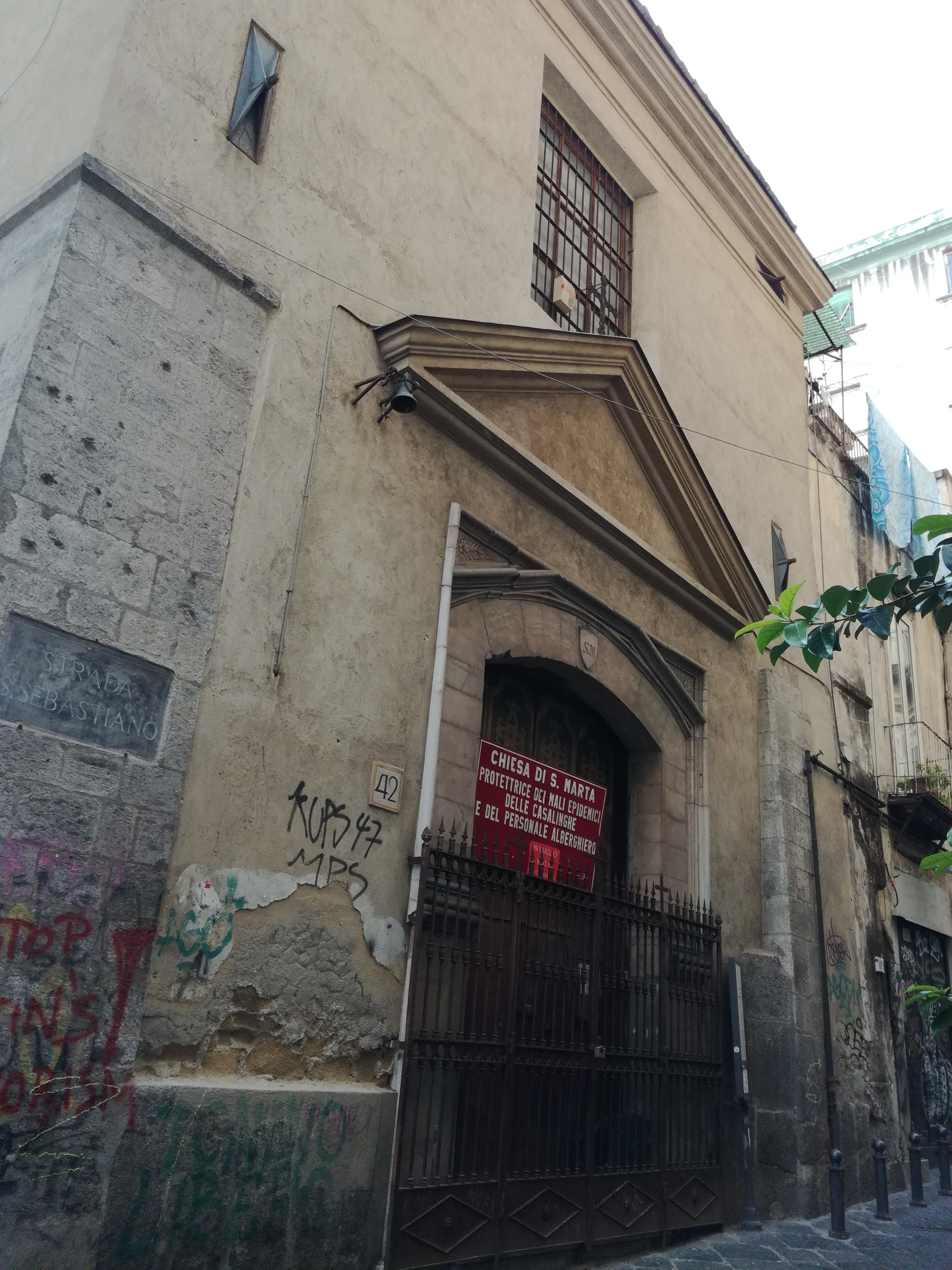
Facade

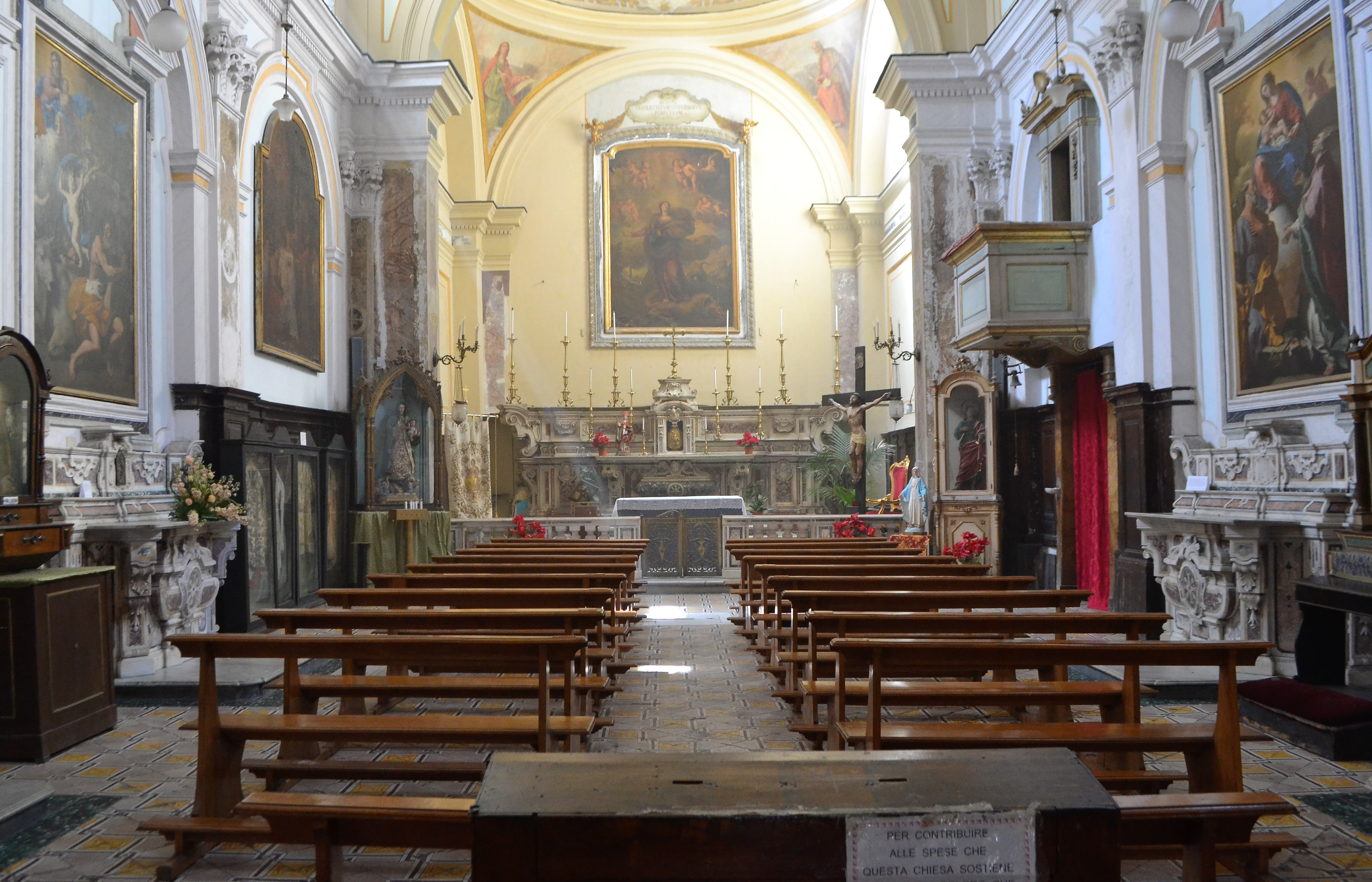
Interior

== History ==
The church was founded in the 15th century by Margherita di Durazzo, mother of King Ladislaus of Naples. The original architect was Andrea Ciccione. Originally belonging to an aristocratic Confraternity, it passed on to a confraternity of Ricamatori. The aristocratic confraternity kept a codex that serves as a contemporary annotation of the heraldry of the nobility of the era. During the Masaniello's Revolution of 1647, the church was sacked and burned. Destroyed was a painting of St Lazarus by Cesare Turco, a Virgin by Bartolomeo Guelfo of Pistoia, and portraits of Margherita e Ladislao. After the revolution, the Prince of Rocca Filomarino, whose palace was in front, rebuilt the church. A further restoration occurred in 1715. The facade and walls retain some elements of the 14th century church. The main altarpiece has San Marta by Andrea Vaccaro and Nicola Vaccaro; a Virgin with Saints Giuseppe and Gennaro by either Ferdinando Sanfelice, or Giovanni Bernardo Lama; a Birth of the Virgin by Salvatore Giusti, and a small Virgin and child by Pacecco de Rosa. The church is only sporadically open and in need of restoration.
