= Palazzo Carafa della Spina =

Coordinates: 40.8479°N 14.2542°E

The Palazzo Carafa della Spina is a historic palace located on Via Benedetto Croce number 45, (part of Via Spaccanapoli) in the quartiere San Giuseppe of Naples, Italy. It is located between the Piazza of the Gesu Nuovo and the Piazza of San Domenico Maggiore. The Palace once belonged to a branch of the Carafa family.

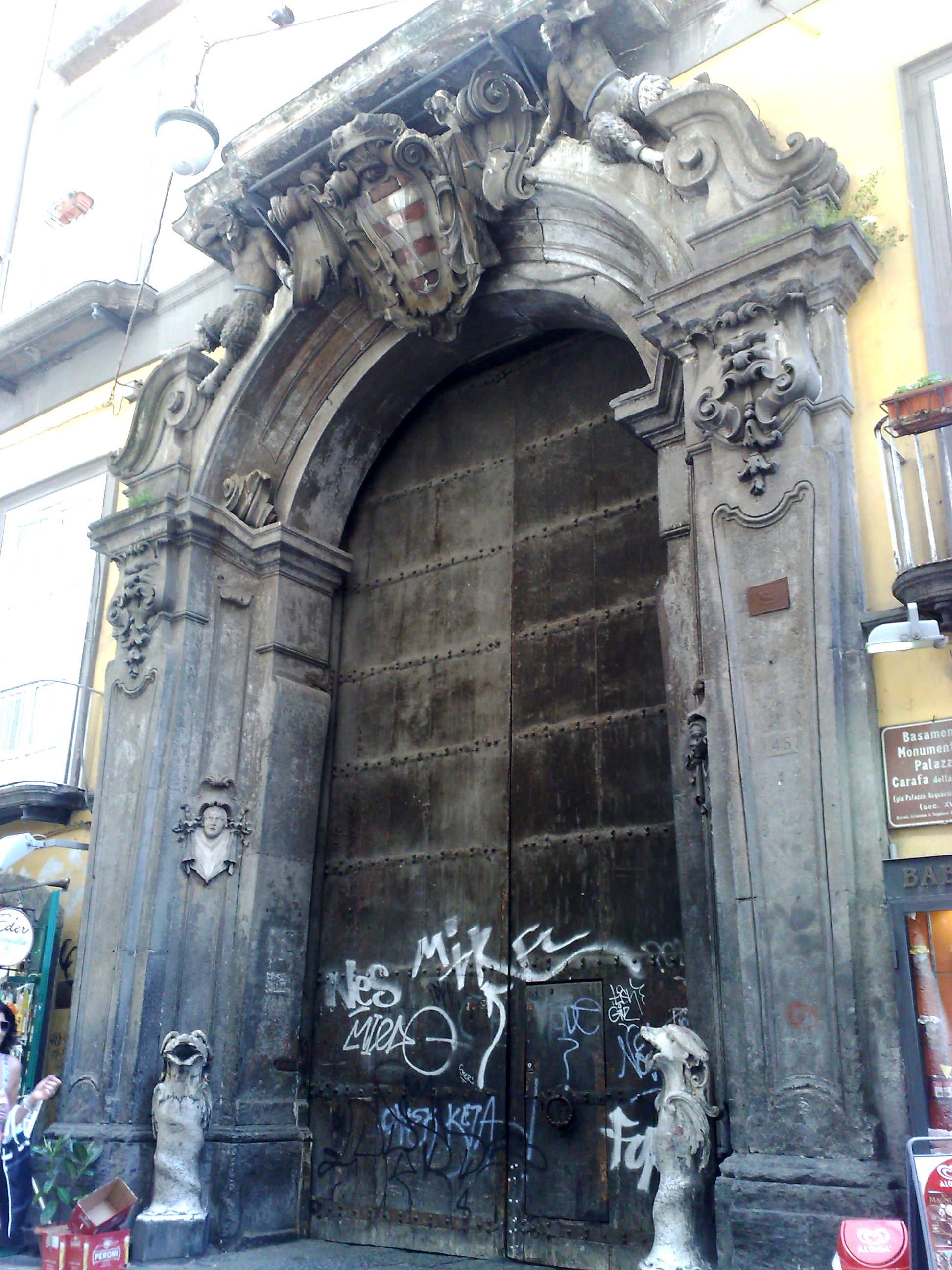
Entrance Portal

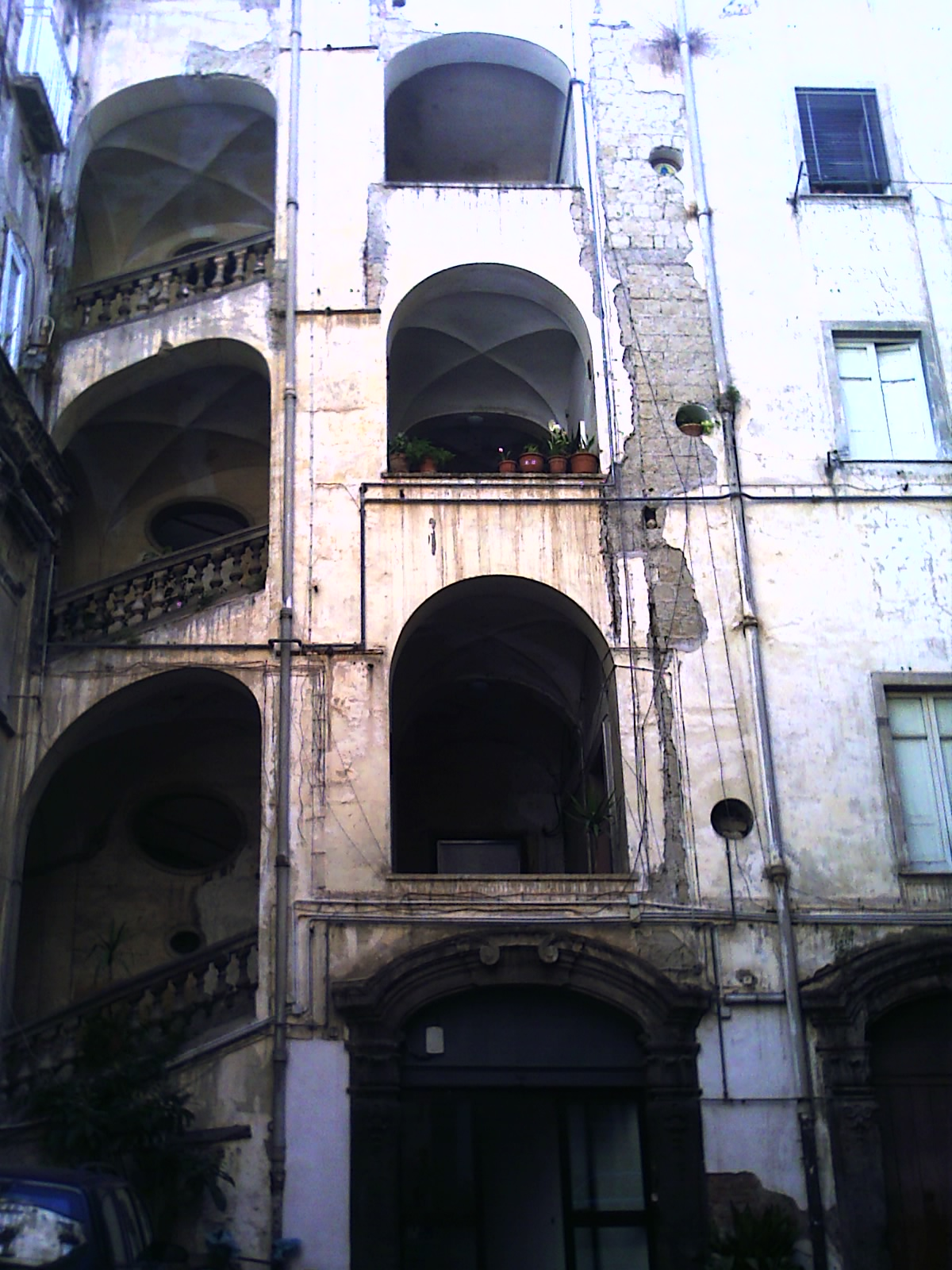
Courtyard stairwell

The building was also known as the Palace of Fabrizio Carafa, Prince of Butera and Roccella, which later was inherited by Carlo Maria Carafa, famous being part of the cavalcade that brought the Chinea or tribute of Naples to Pope Innocent XI, and patron of the Carafa Chapel in San Domenico Maggiore.

In the 16th century, a member of the Carafa della Spina family acquired the palace at this site, and it was rebuilt in the first half of the 17th century, likely using the architect Domenico Fontana. The palace was reconstructed in the 18th century by the architect Martino Buonocore.

The elaborate Baroque portal made of piperno rock, create a grand entrance to the courtyard. Atop the portal, two satyrs serve as telamons to support the balcony and hold the heraldic shield of the Carafa family. Further below are two flanking masks and pylons with lion heads. The portal and internal stairwell have been attributed to Ferdinando Sanfelice.
