= San Gennaro all'Olmo =

Church of San Gennaro all’Olmo
- Chiesa di San Gennaro all’Olmo
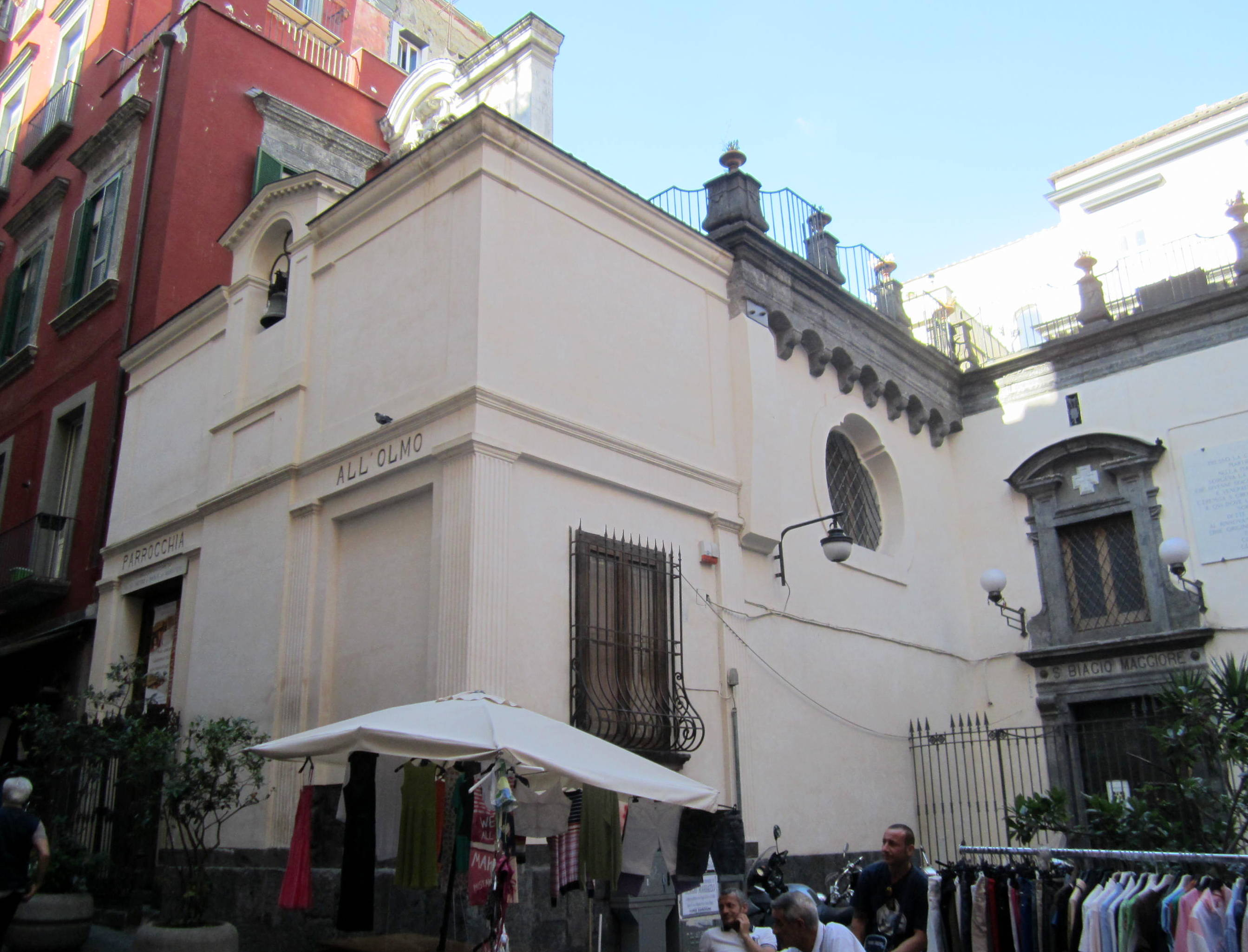
- The church of San Gennaro all’Olmo.
- Church of San Gennaro all’Olmo
- 40.849515°N 14.258240°E
- Location: Naples; Province of Naples, Campania
- Country: Italy
- Denomination: Roman Catholic

Architecture
- Architectural type: Church
- Style: Baroque architecture
- Completed: 1908

Administration
- Diocese: Roman Catholic Archdiocese of Naples

The deconsecrated church of San Gennaro all’Olmo is a former religious edifice located in the city center of Naples, Italy, on Via San Gregorio Armeno. It is adjacent and for many years integral to the chapel-church of San Biagio Maggiore.

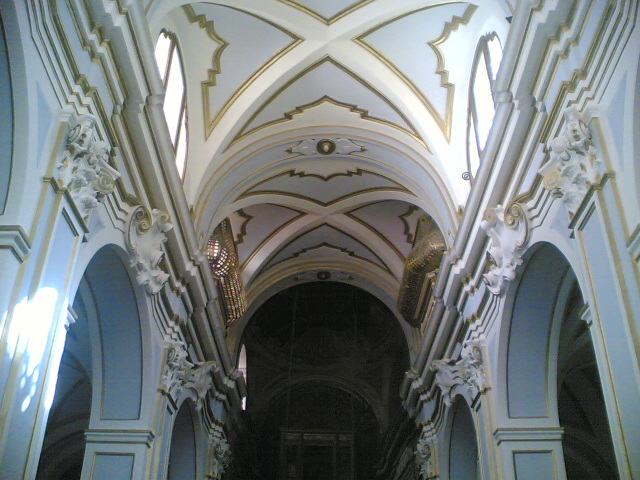
Restored ceiling (2007)

== History ==
There is mention that a church at the site dates from the time of emperor Constantine in the 4th century, but there is only documentation for a foundation by the seventh century by the Bishop of Naples, Sant’Agnello. The early name of the church was San Gennaro ad Diaconiam, and this was the first church in the city dedicated to this saint. In the 8th century, Armenian monks fleeing the Byzantine Iconoclasm, were accommodated in this church, where they brought relics of St Gregory and St Blaise. The adjacent San Biagio Maggiore was built to house the latter's skull. The church once had a tall shady elm tree in front, hence its name.

In the late 16th century, the church was ceded to Congregazione dei 72 Sacerdoti, and renamed the church of San Michele Arcangelo. The church was rebuilt in Baroque decoration with stucco and polychrome marble with maiolica floor tiles. For decades, the church fell into decay, and now the deconsecrated building is in the custody of the cultural organization: Fondazione Giambattista Vico.
