= Decumano Superiore, Naples =

Road in the Ancient Roman city of Naples

Coordinates: 40.8526°N 14.2564°E

The Decumano or Decumanus Superiore was one of the three main east-west roads (Decumani) in the Ancient Roman city of Naples.

This street is the upper (superiore) and most Northern of the three decumani, or east-west streets, of the grid of the original Greco-Roman city of Neapolis. The central main Decumanus Maggiore is now Via dei Tribunali; while the southernmost or lower Decumanus Inferiore is now Spaccanapoli. The three decumani were (and still are) intersected by numerous north-south cross-streets called cardini, together forming the grid of the ancient city.

== Buildings ==
The Decumanus Superiore is now comprised by via della Sapienza and via dell'Anticaglia, and via Santi Apostoli. Among the buildings and palaces on the road are:

- Church of Santa Maria della Sapienza
- Palazzo Bonifacio a Regina Coeli
- Church of Santa Maria Regina Coeli
- Palazzo Pisanelli
- Church of Santa Maria di Gerusalemme
- Ospedale degli Incurabili
- Roman Theater di Neapolis
- Palazzo Caracciolo di Avellino
- Church of San Giuseppe dei Ruffi
- Palazzo arcivescovile
- Church of Santa Maria Donnaregina Nuova
- Church of Santa Maria Ancillarum
- Church of Santi Apostoli
- Church of Santa Sofia

The other two decumani are closer to the coast: Decumano Maggiore (Via dei Tribunali) and Decumano Inferiore (Spaccanapoli), also exist in some form or other, mostly as narrow lanes.
