= Decumanus =

Main east–west street within a Roman city

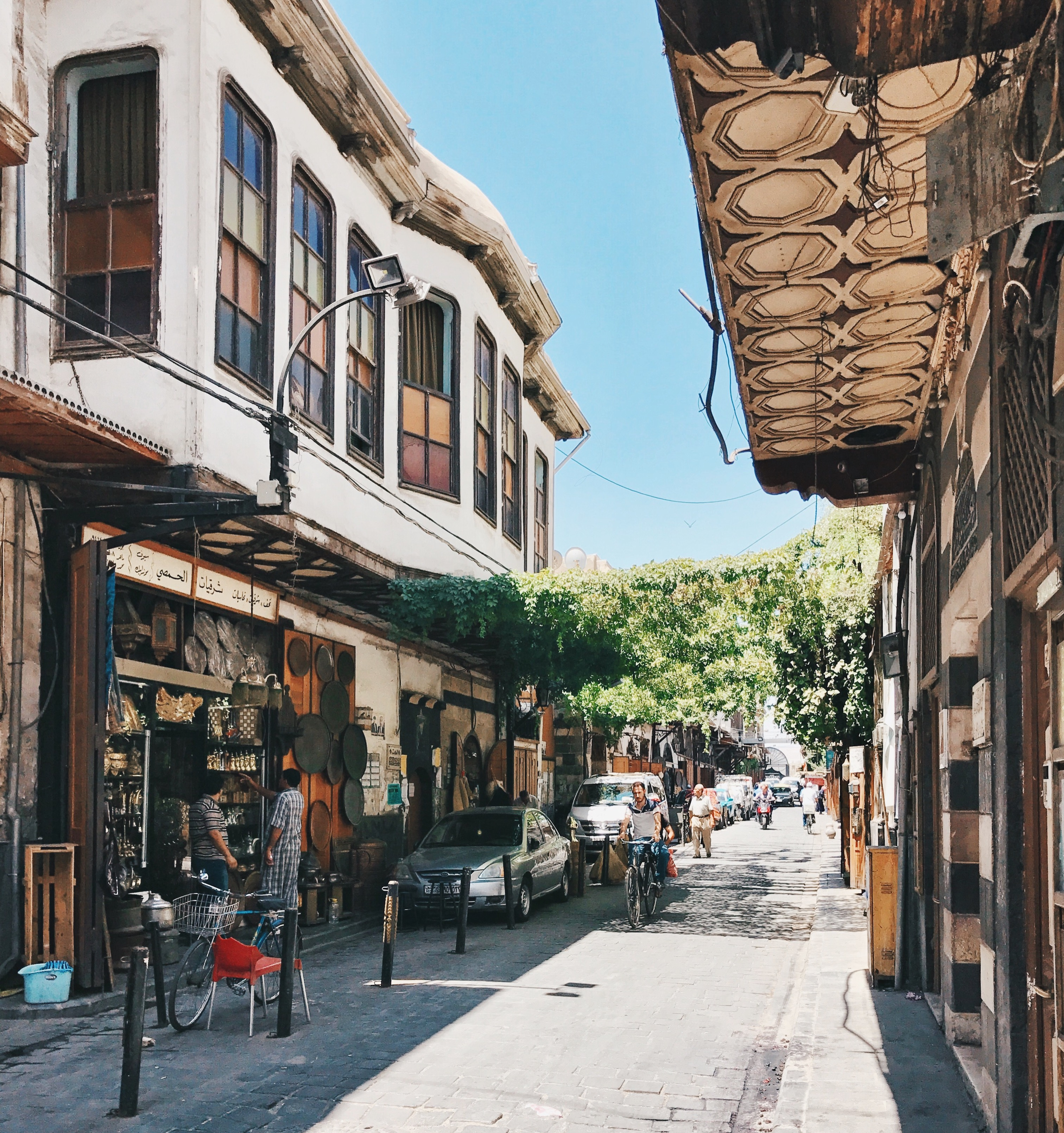
The Straight Street or Via Recta, the main street in the Old city of Damascus, was the city's decumanus, built by the Romans. (Pictured 2017)

In Roman urban planning, a decumanus was an east–west-oriented road in a Roman city or castrum (military camp). The main decumanus of a particular city was the decumanus maximus, or most often simply "the decumanus". In the rectangular street grid of the typical Roman city plan, the decumanus was crossed by the perpendicular cardo, a north–south street.

In a military camp, the decumanus connected the Porta Praetoria (closest to the enemy) to the Porta Decumana (away from the enemy).

In the center – called groma – of a city or castrum, the decumanus maximus crossed the perpendicular cardo maximus, the primary north–south road. The forum was normally located close to this intersection.

== Etymology ==
Decumanus or decimanus was the Latin word for 'tenth'. This name is said to come from the fact that the via decumana or decimana (the "tenth") separated the Tenth Cohort from the Ninth in the legionary encampment, in the same way as the via quintana separated the Fifth Cohort from the Sixth.

== Examples ==
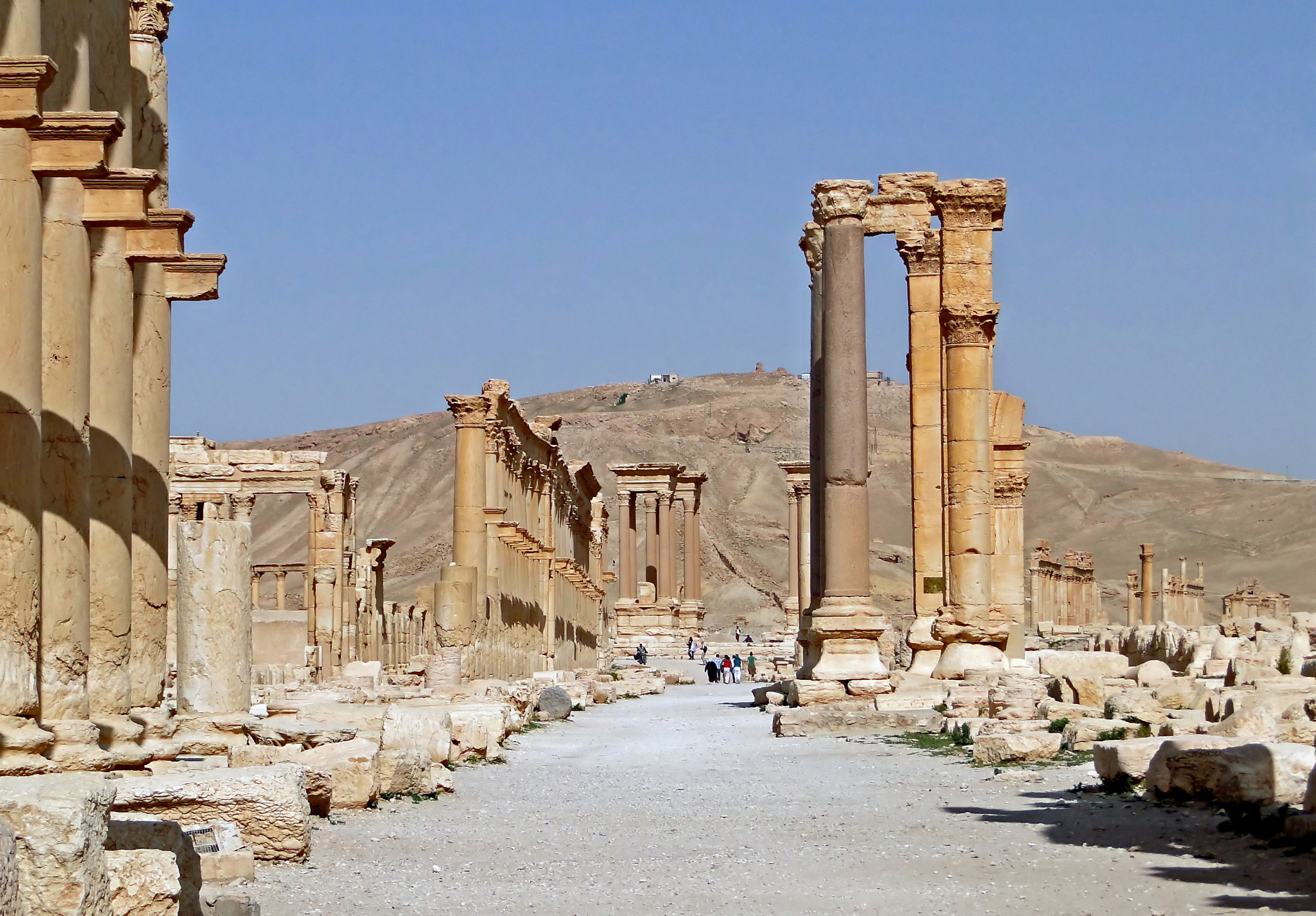
Decumanus maximus in Palmyra, Syria

=== Barcino, Barcelona ===
In the ancient Roman city of Barcino (present day Barcelona, Spain), the decumanus maximus started at the late-Roman gate (which still stands) in front of the current Plaça Nova square.

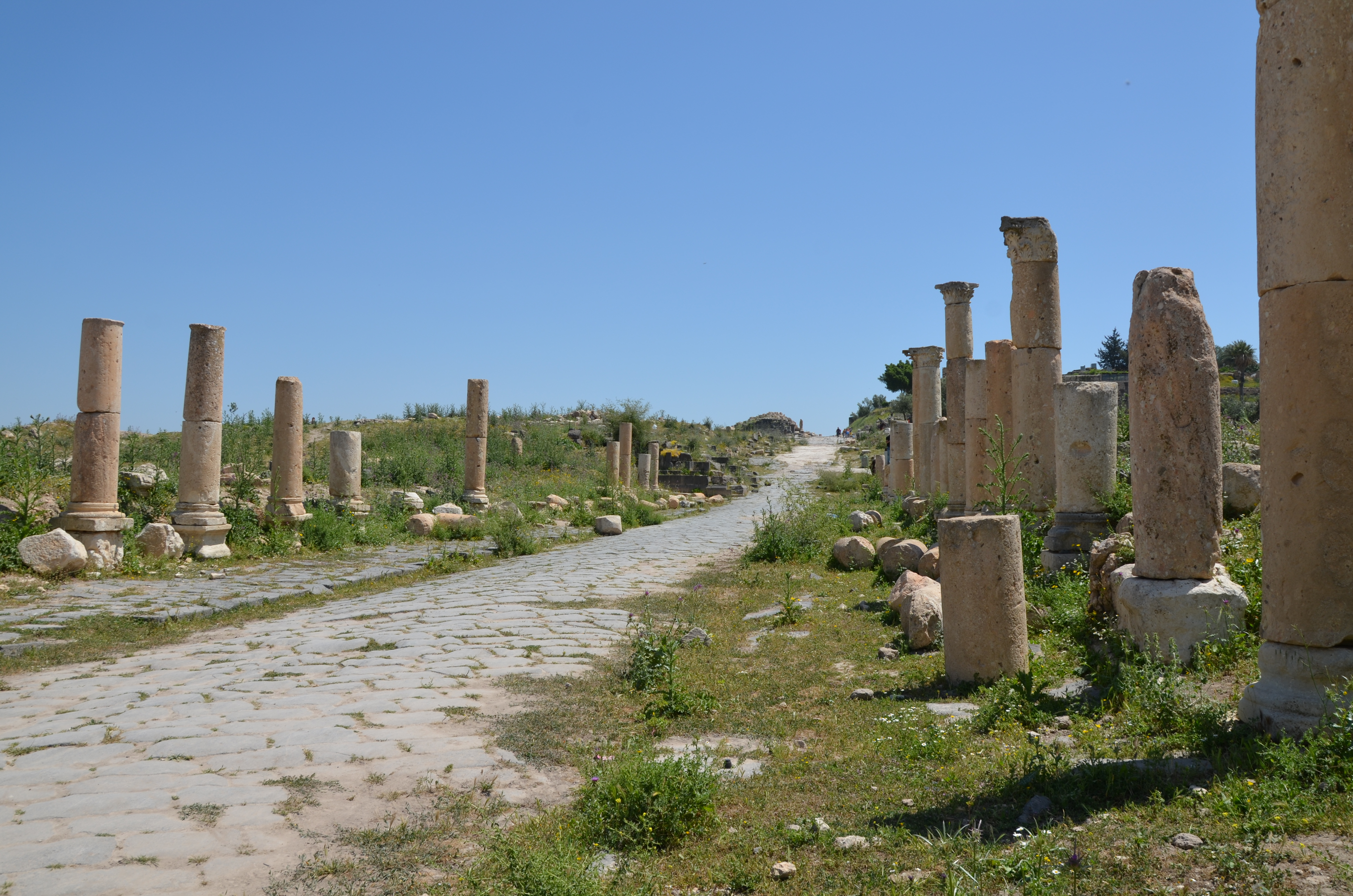
Decumanus maximus in Gadara, Jordan

=== Split, Croatia ===
Within the city of Split, in present-day Croatia, is the UNESCO Roman monument, Diocletian's Palace. This city, built by the Emperor Diocletian, exhibits the characteristic Roman orthogonal street system with the decumanus maximus connecting the west Iron Gate to the east Silver Gate.

=== Gadara, Jordan ===
In Roman Gadara, present-day Umm Qais, in Jordan, the decumanus runs east–west for approximately one kilometre with its ancient flagstones extant.

=== Damascus, Syria ===
Another fine example is the Straight Street or Via Recta in Damascus, which is 1,500 metres long, connecting the eastern and western gates.

=== Beirut, Lebanon ===
In Beirut's central business district, Rue Weygand, which runs east–west, still follows the ancient Roman decumanus.

=== Florence, Italy ===
In Florence, the decumanus is preserved as the streets Via Strozzi, Via Speziali, and Via del Corso in the city's old centre. Although these streets have different names, they form a continuous line with a split between the Via Strozzi and Via Speziali by the Palazzo Strozzi. In Roman times, these three streets formed the decumanus of Florentina, the name of the Roman colonia. The Via Roma and the Via Calimala are formed from the ancient cardo, and what was once the forum in ancient Florence is now the Piazza della Repubblica.

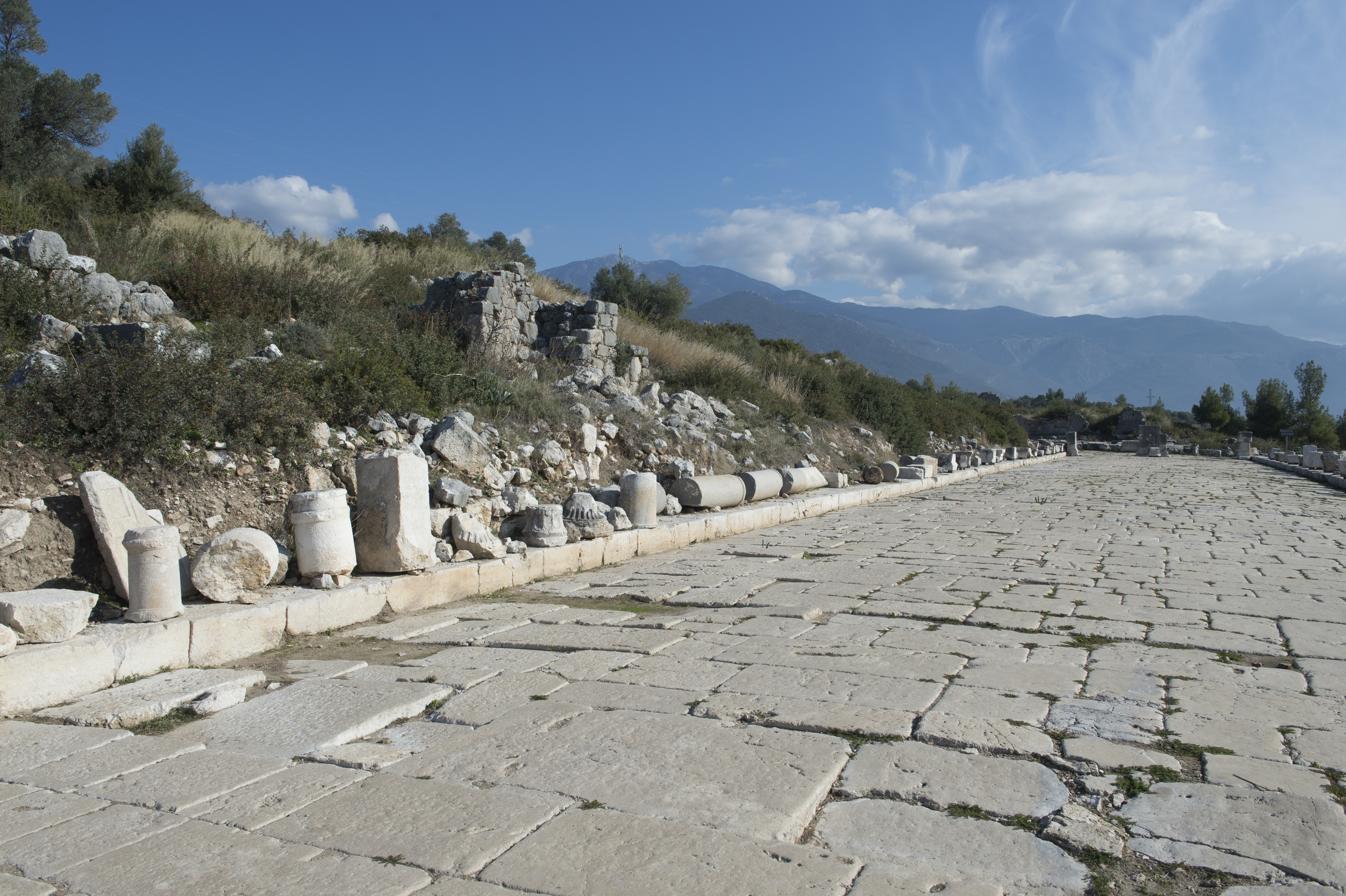
Decumanus in Xanthos, Antalya Province, Turkey

In Naples, there still exist three main decumani which are, from north to south:

- Superiore: consisting of Via Sapienza, Via Pisanelli, and Via Anticaglia;
- Maggiore: Via dei Tribunali;
- Inferiore: Via Spaccanapoli, consisting of Via Benedetto Croce and Via San Biagio dei Librai.

== Gallery ==
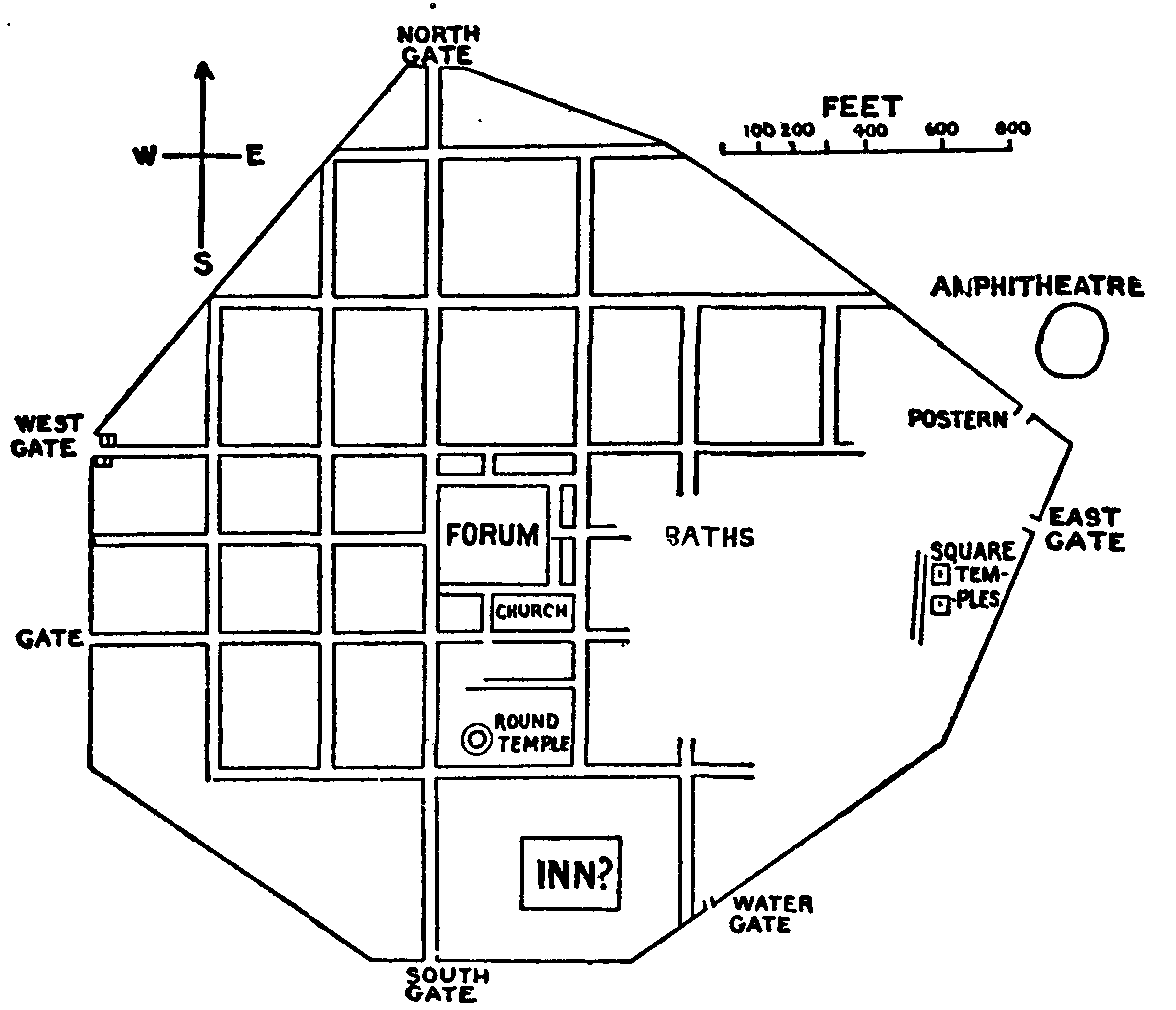
Plan of Silchester, England

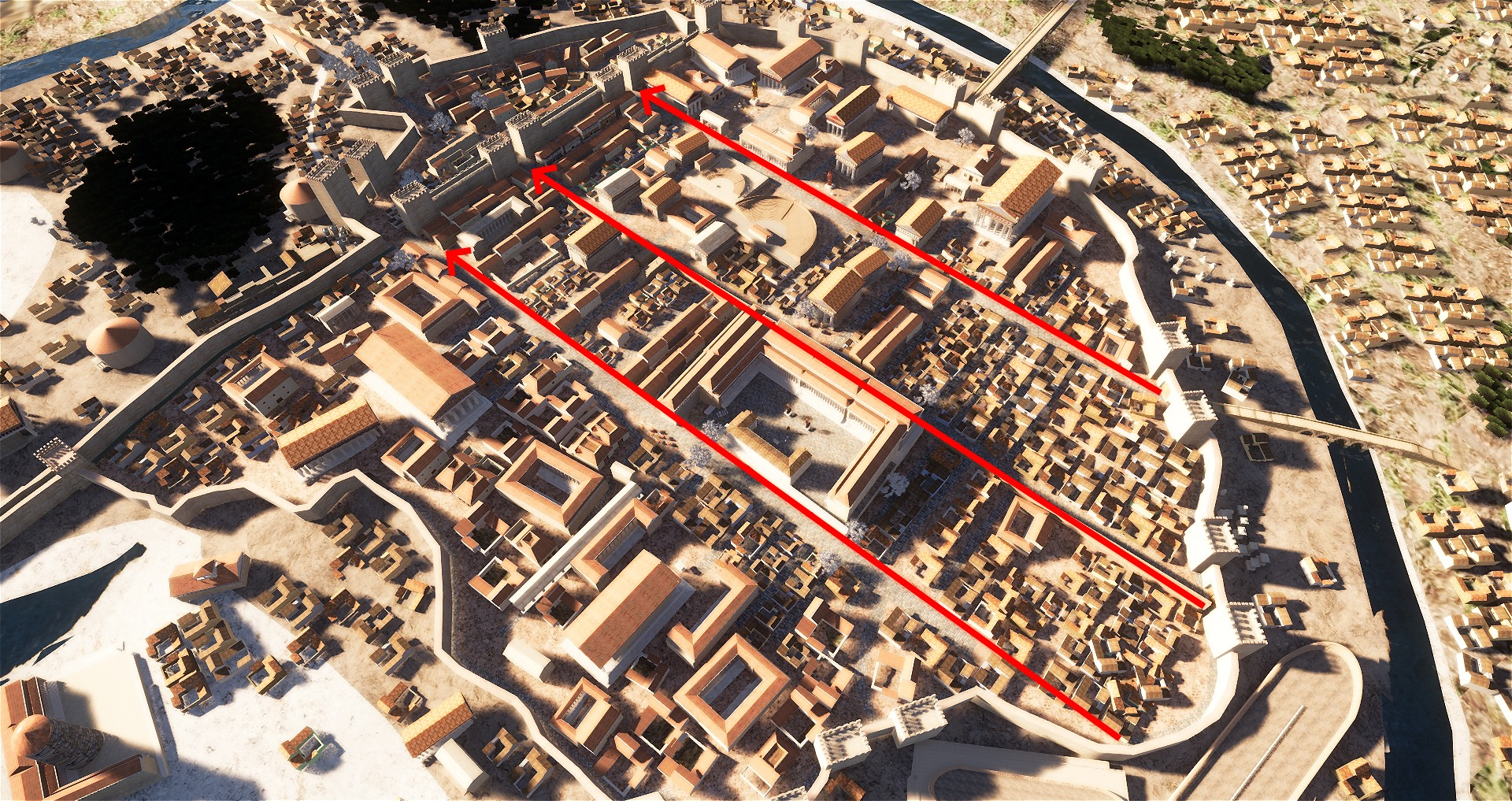
Ancient Naples, decumani in red

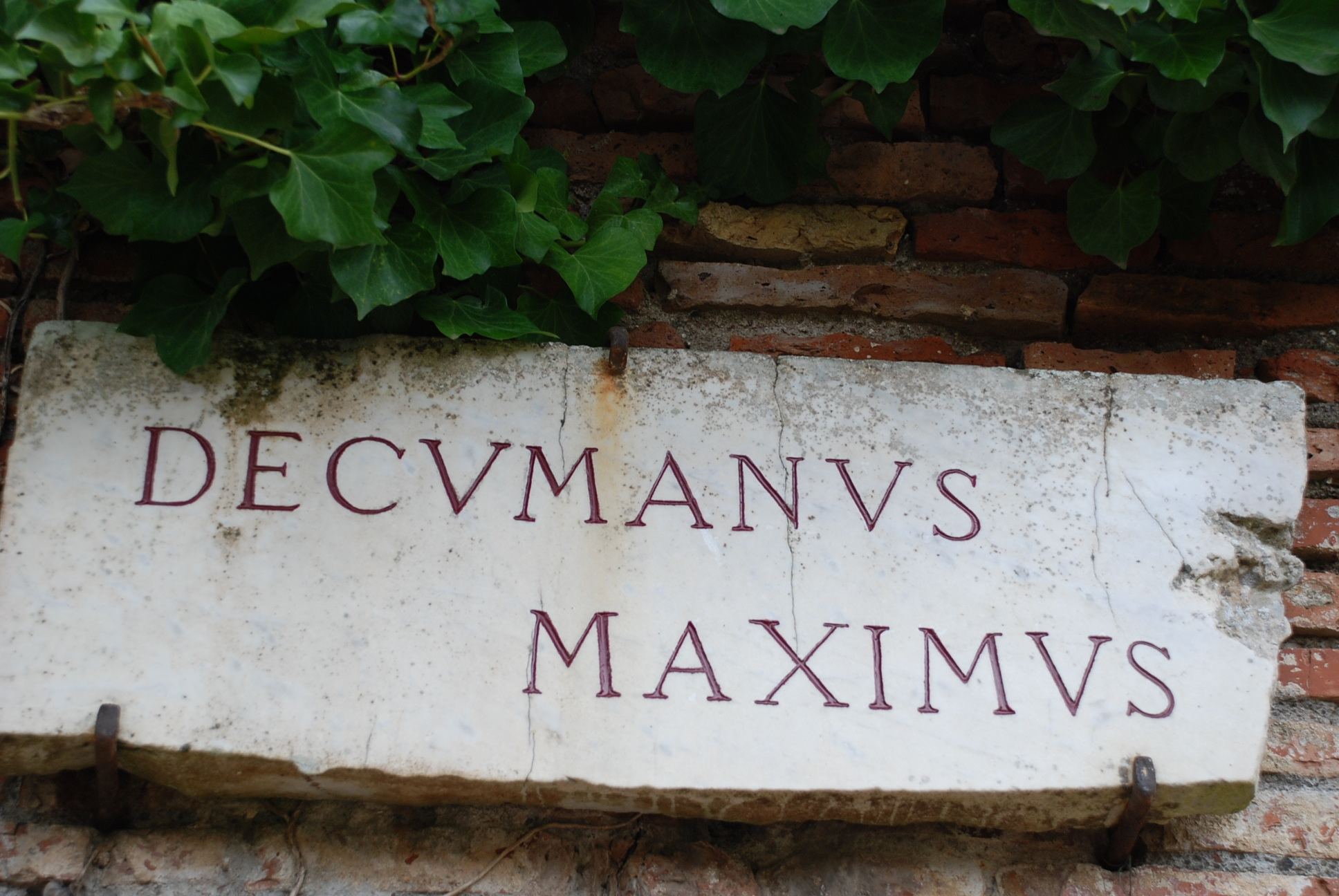
Sign indicating the decumanus maximus in Ostia Antica

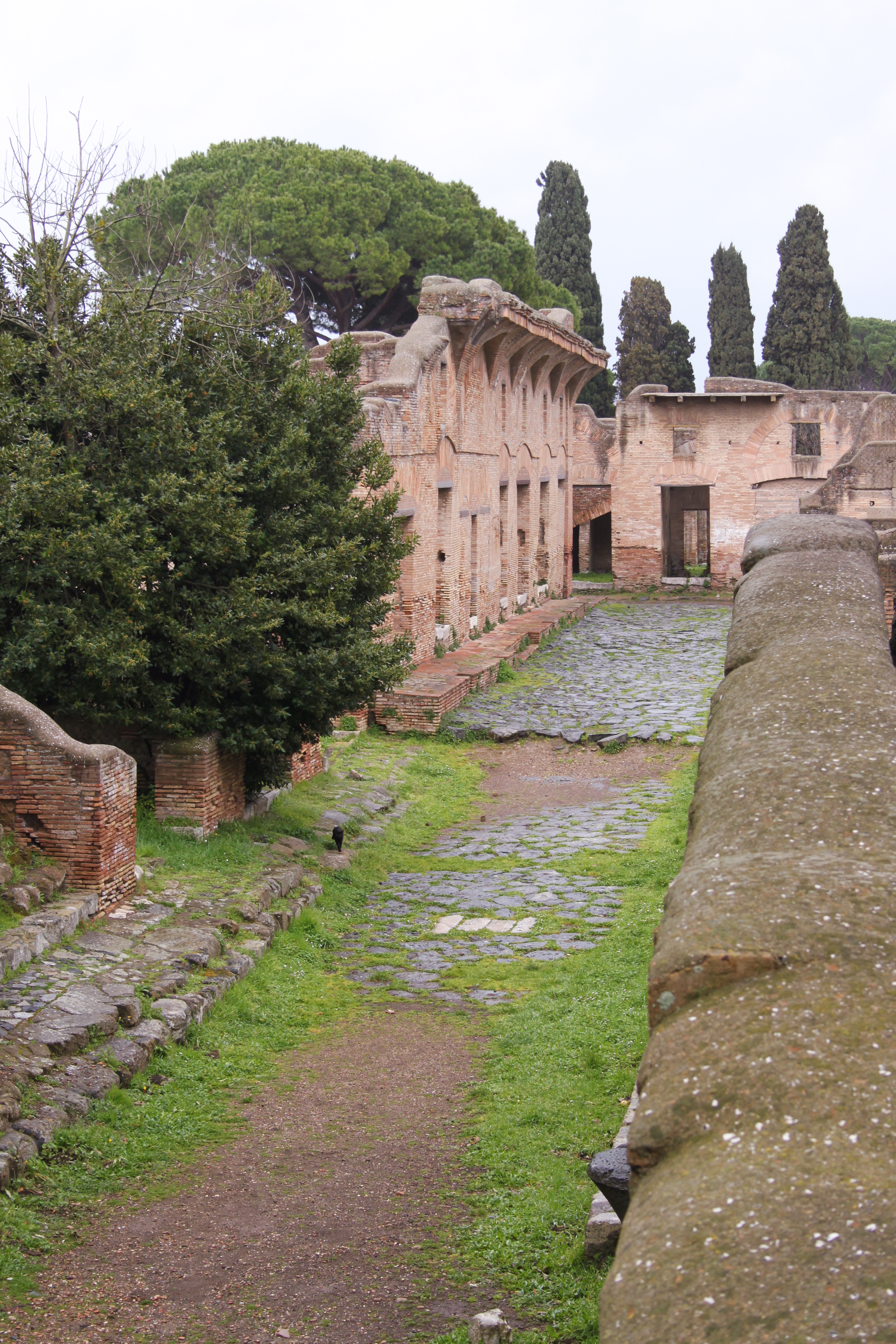
Ostia Antica, near Rome

== See also ==
Cardo Maximus

== External Resources ==
- Exhaustive list of Roman decumanus maximus
