= Pacecco De Rosa =

Italian painter

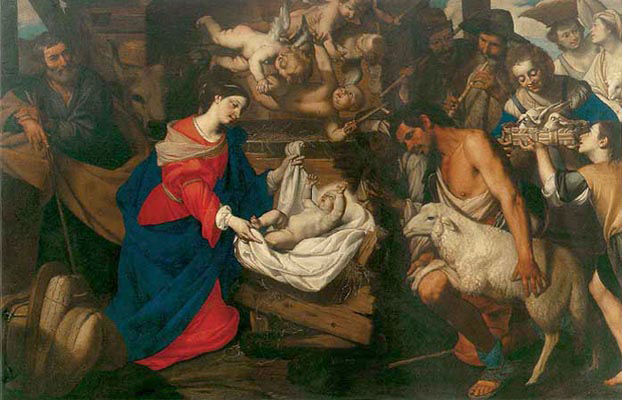
Adoration of the Shepherds (1630). Rome, Palazzo Montecitorio.

Pacecco De Rosa (byname of Giovanni Francesco De Rosa; 17 December 1607 - 1656) was an Italian painter, active in Naples.

== Biography ==
He was a contemporary of Massimo Stanzione or, according to others, a pupil of his. De Rosa was influenced by his father-in-law, Filippo Vitale, also a painter: this is shown in his earlier works, such as a Deposition now in the Museum of the Certosa di San Martino. Also in the Certosa is a St. Nicholas of Bari and Basilius (1636), showing influences of both Stanzione and Domenichino, who was in Naples from 1631.

Attributed to De Rosa is a series portraying the Madonna with Child (one in the Museum of the Certosa di San Martino; one in the church of Santa Marta, Naples; and one in the National Gallery of Prague). Of the 1640s is a painting, in collaboration with Vitale, of the Madonna with St. Charles Borromeo in the church of San Domenico Maggiore. His other works include an Annunciation in San Gregorio Armeno, St. Thomas of Aquino in Santa Maria della Sanità and the later Massacre of the Innocents in the Museum of Philadelphia and Diana Bathing in the Capodimonte Museum.

Among the artists thought to be in his circle are Girolamo De Magistro.

He died in Naples in 1656 from the Plague.

== Gallery ==
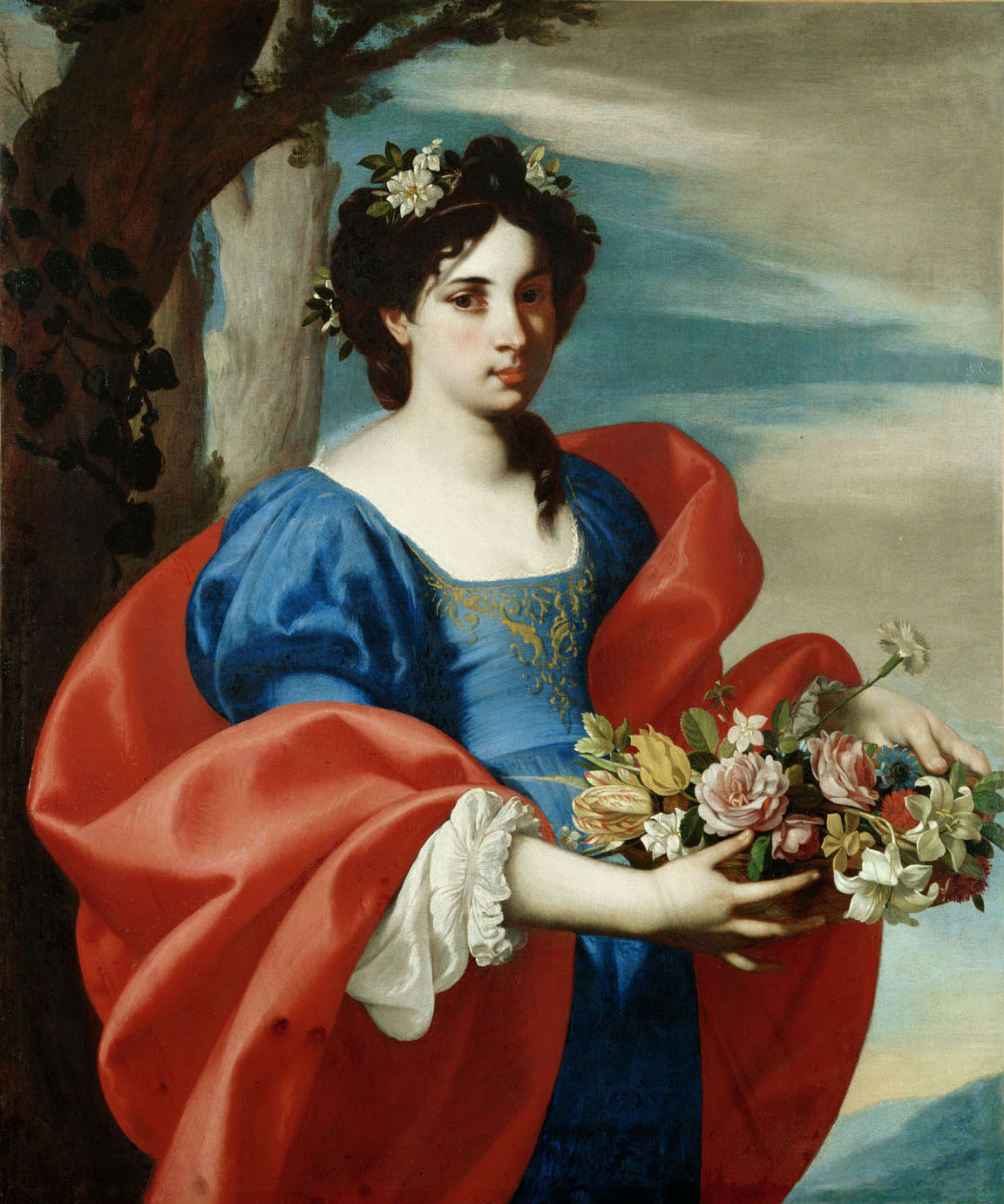
Flora

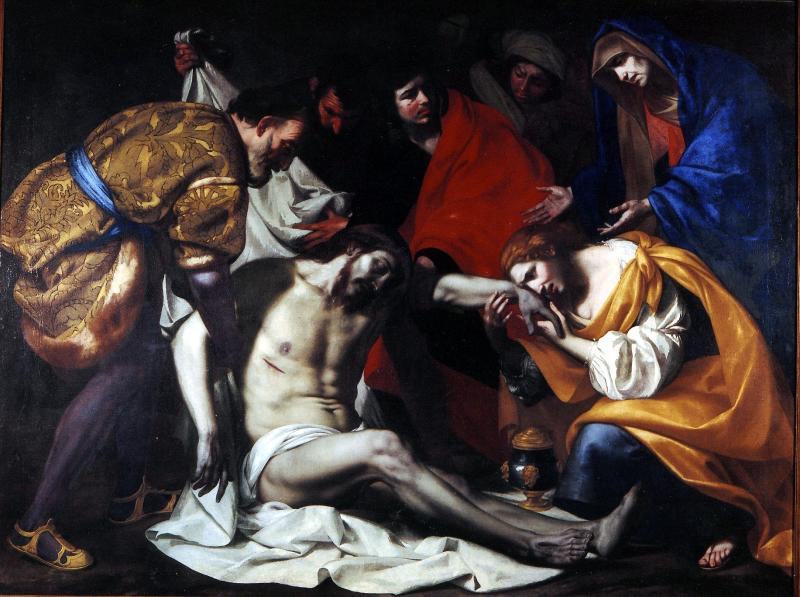
Deposition

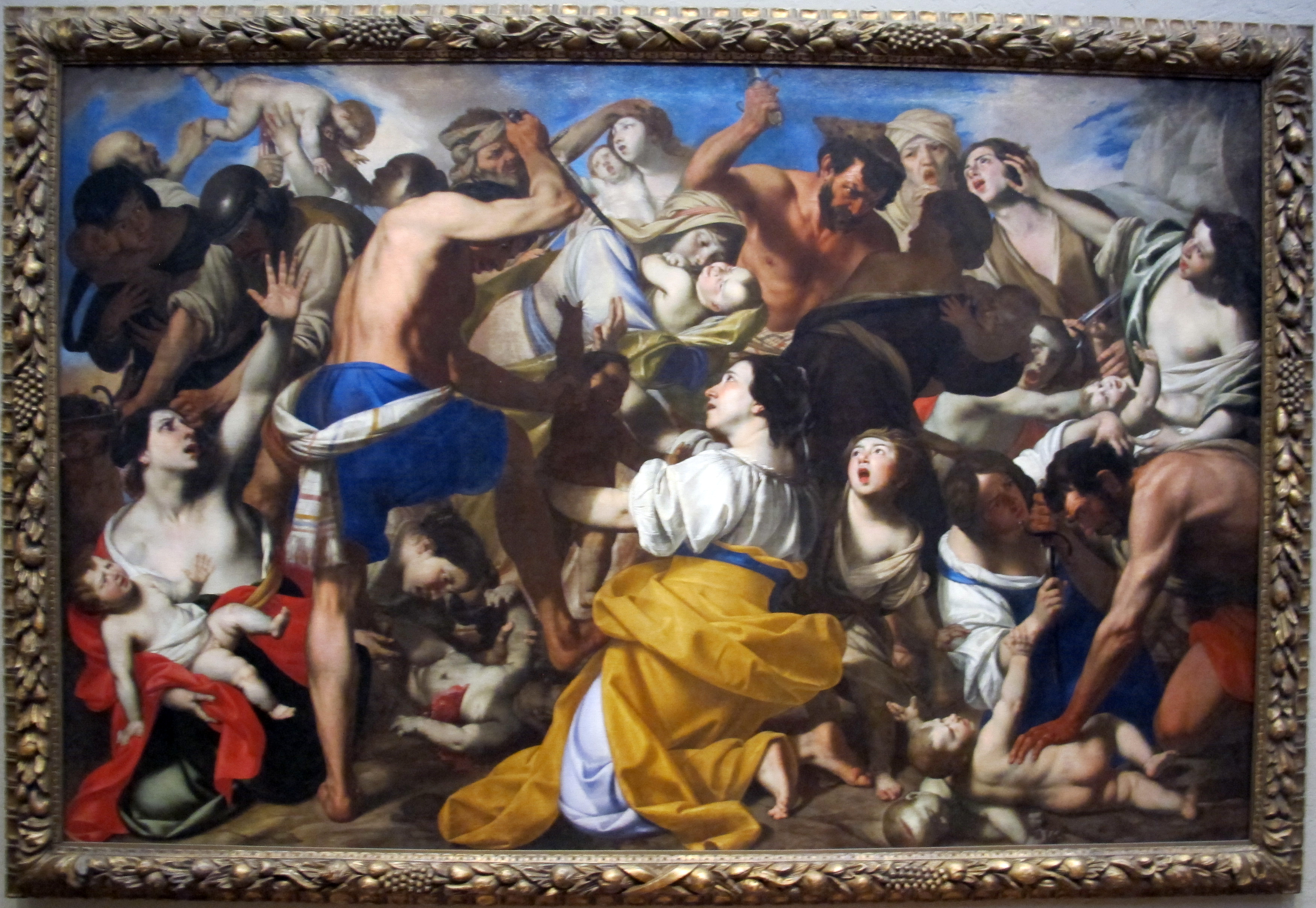
Massacre of the Innocents

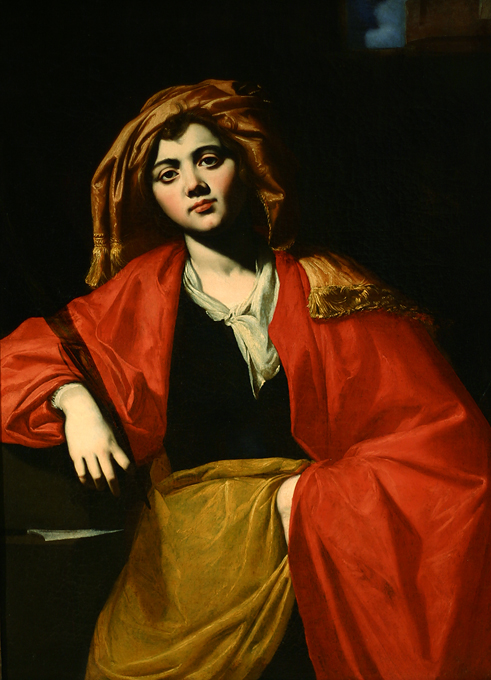
Portrait of a boy

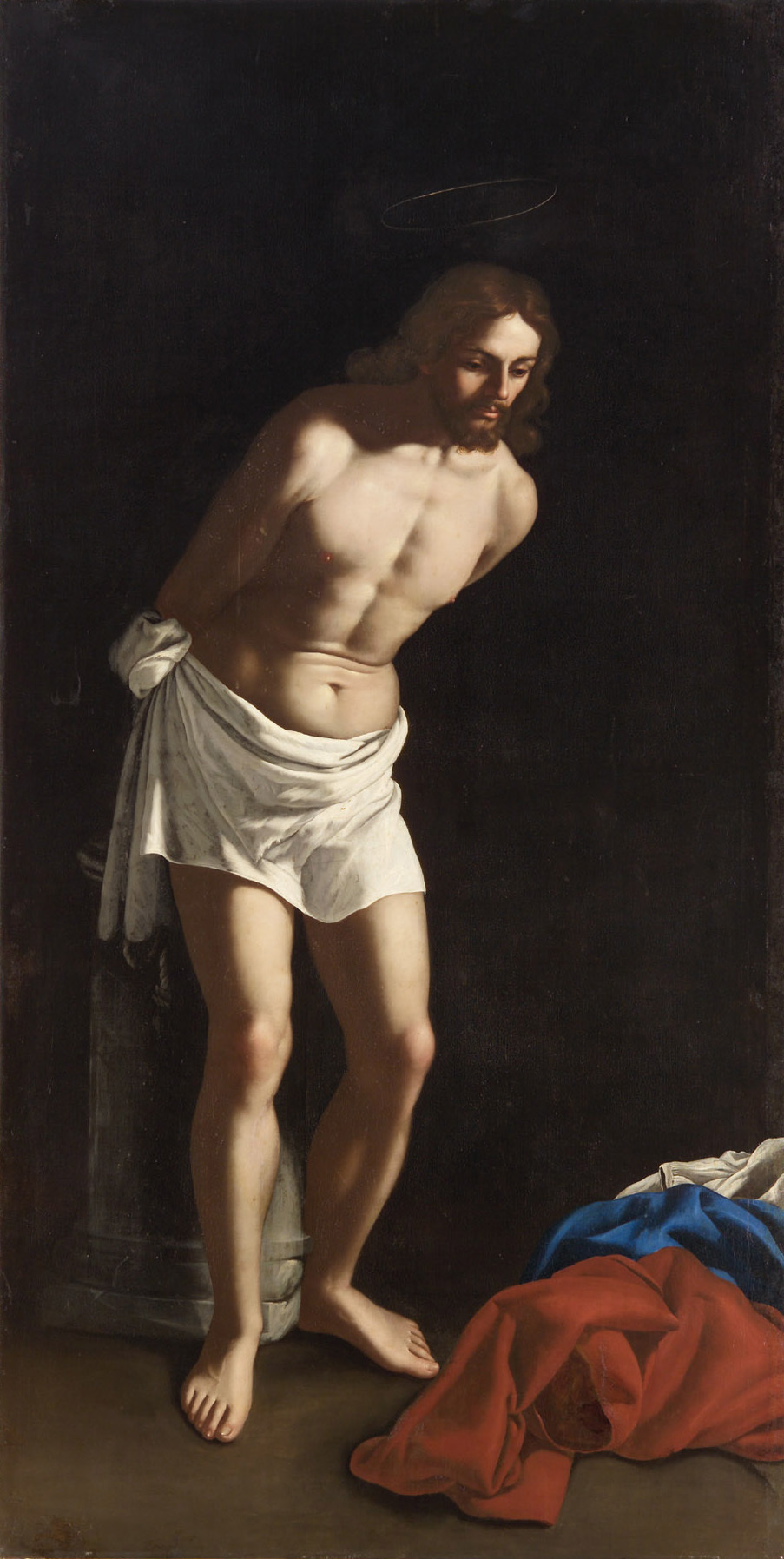
Christ at the Column

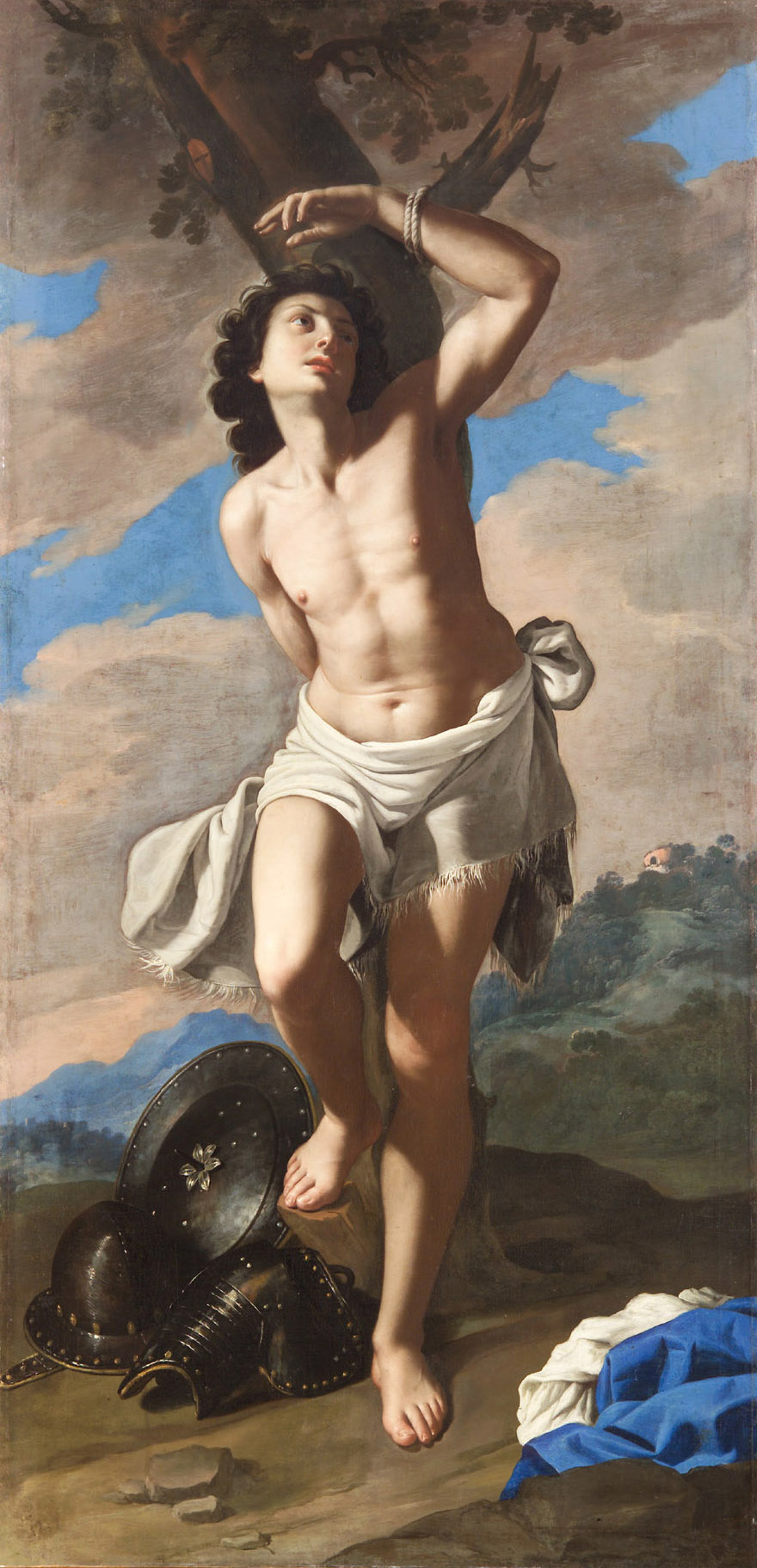
Saint Sebastian

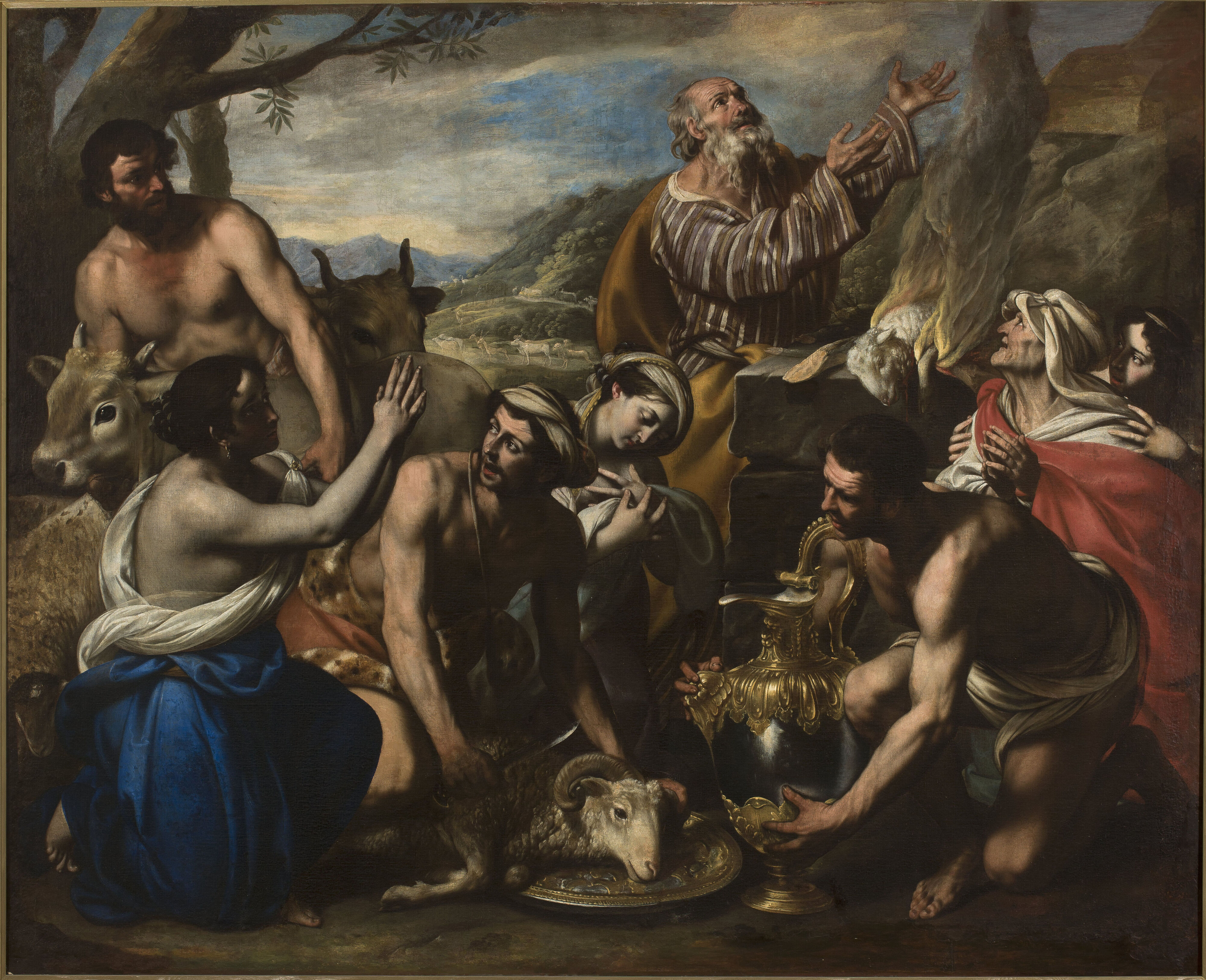
Sacrifice of Noah

== Sources ==
- Pacelli, Vincenzo (2008). Giovanfrancesco de Rosa detto Pacecco de Rosa. Naples: Paparo Edizioni.
