= San Biagio Maggiore =

- Chiesa di San Biagio Maggiore
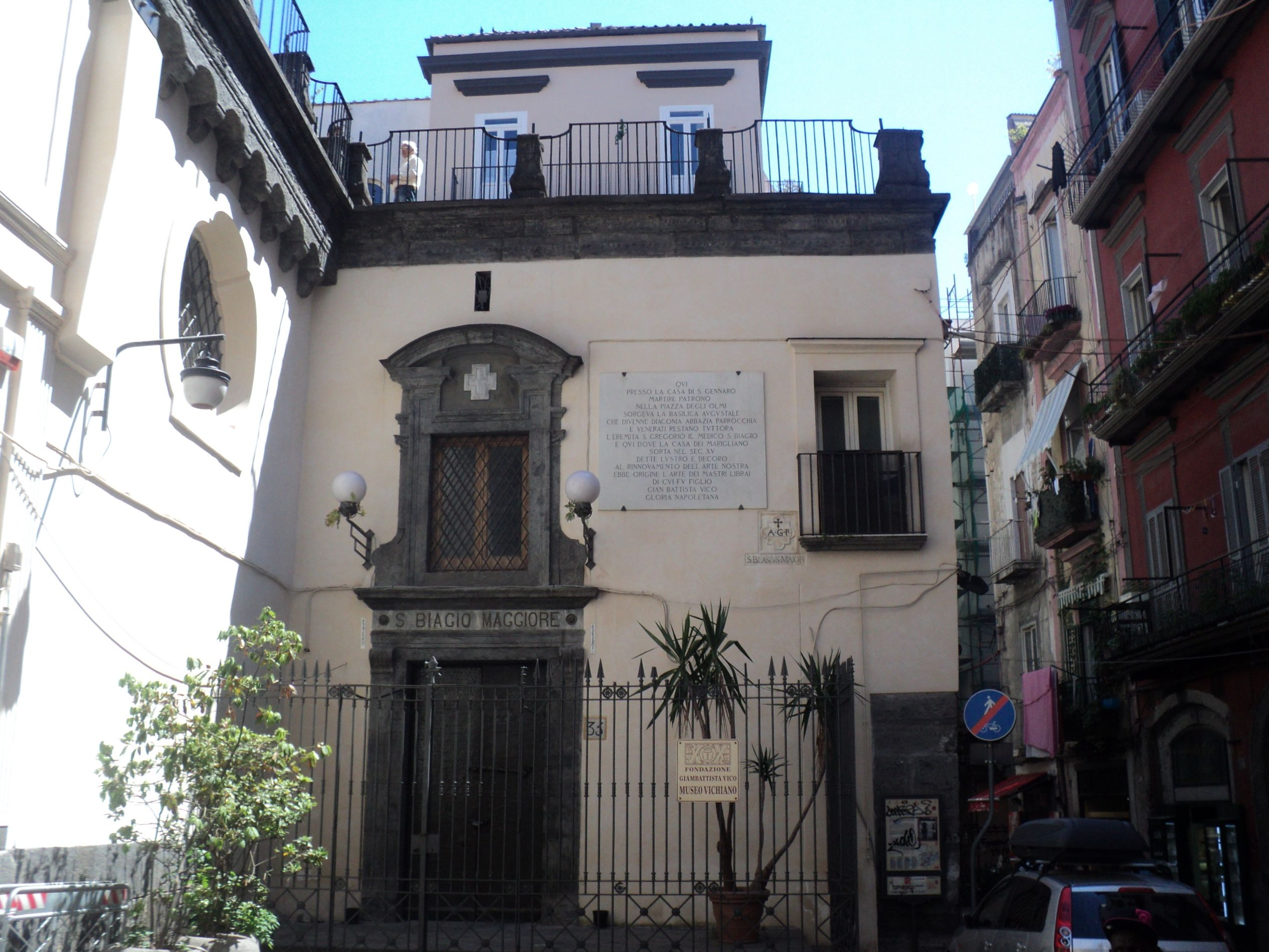
- Façade of church.
- San Biagio Maggiore
- 40.849460°N 14.258350°E
- Location: Naples
- Country: Campania
- Denomination: Roman Catholic Church

History
- Founded: 1631
- Dedicated: 1631

The church of San Biagio Maggiore also known to its locals as 'Santa Patrizia' is a small former religious edifice located at the intersection of Via San Biagio dei Librai and Via San Gregorio Armeno, which was an integral part in the city center of Naples, Italy. It is adjacent, and for many years integral to the church of San Gennaro all’Olmo.

== History ==
The church was founded in the 8th century, when Armenian monks fleeing due to the Byzantine Iconoclasm, came to Naples. They brought with them relics of Saints Gregory and Biagio. They initially built a chapel to shelter the skull of San Biagio next to the church of San Gennaro. In 1543, custody of the chapel was granted to the Congregation of the Booksellers (Librai), who clustered in this zone of the city. The latter constructed a chapel for the relic at this location. By 1628, veneration had increased, and San Biagio was declared a protector of the Neapolitan realm. The Saint and the chapel were also involved in the intercession of poor women wishing to marry and those afflicted with throat maladies. In 1631, Cardinal Francesco Boncompagno founded the new small church we see now. The statue of the saint has been moved to the church of Santi Filippo e Giacomo. For years, the church fell into decay, and now the deconsecrated building is in the custody of the cultural organization: Fondazione Giambattista Vico.

== See also ==
- Churches in Naples
