= Giuseppe Picano =

Italian sculptor

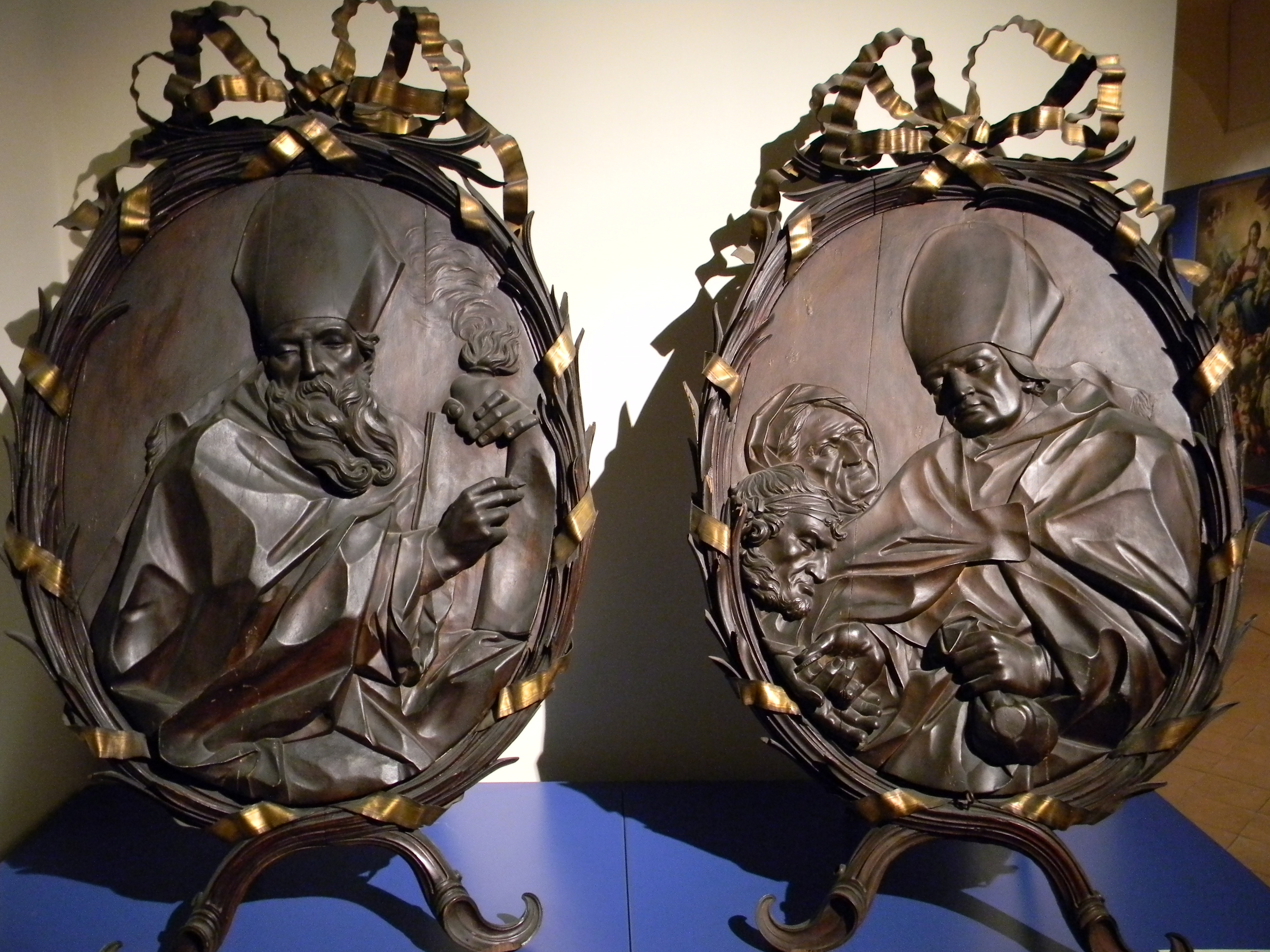
Wood reliefs by Picano

Giuseppe Picano (1716 – 1810) was an Italian sculptor.

Picano was born in Sant'Elia Fiumerapido. Trained by Luigi Vanvitelli and Carlo Vanvitelli, he collaborated with Giuseppe Sanmartino as well as working independently. He mainly worked on religious themes in marble, terracotta, stucco, wood, papier-mâché and other materials. He mainly produced artworks for churches and individuals in his birthplace and in Campania.

== Bibliography (in Italian) ==
- Antonio Lanni, Guida storica-turistica-commerciale di Sant'Elia Fiumerapido. Editore LAPI sas, Arti Grafiche Carmanica Marina di Minturno (LT) 1999
- Giovanni Petrucci, Vincenzo Pomella, Arpinate stampa s.r.l., Arpino febbraio 1979.
- Santelia Fiumerapido, CD-ROM edited by Bassa Ciociaria progetto Open Toor
