= Bartolomeo Vecchione =

Italian architect

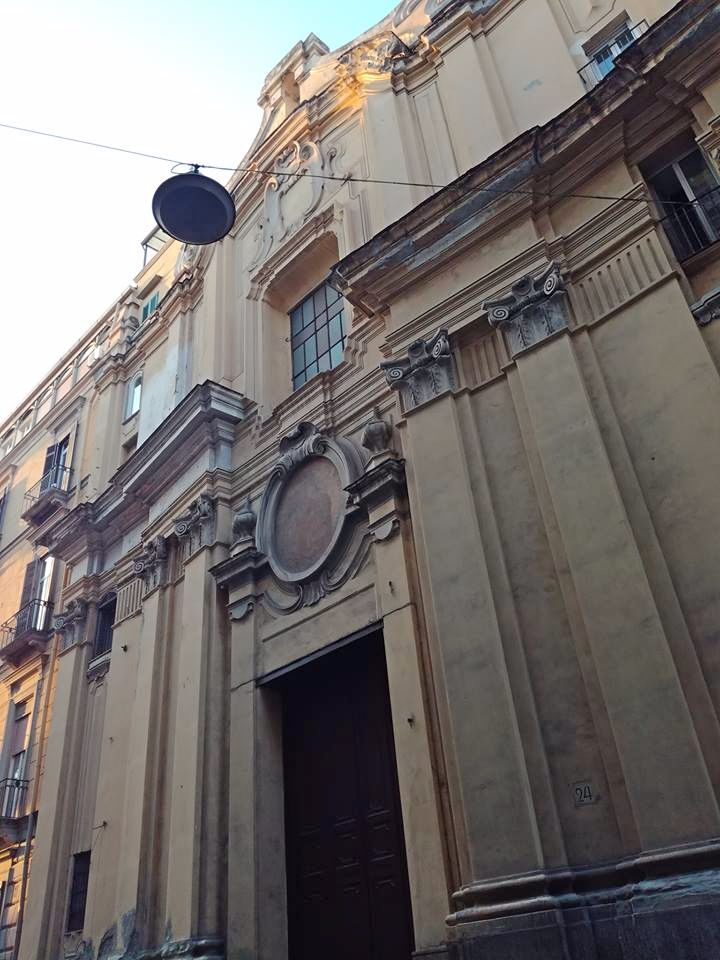
Facade of the church of the Concezione at Chiatamone

Bartolomeo Vecchione is a late 18th-century Italian architect of the late-Baroque or Rococo period, active in and around Naples.

== Life ==
Little is known about his origins and training; he clearly appears influenced by Ferdinando Sanfelice and Luigi Vanvitelli, two contemporary masters of Southern architecture. He was the younger brother of the shipyard engineer, Luca Vecchione. Between 1747 and 1751, in collaboration with Crescenzo Torchese, he designed the structure of the elaborately decorated and remarkable pharmacy attached to the Ospedale degli Incurabili in central Naples. He aided in the reconstruction of the church of San Francesco delle Monache with the construction of an atrium in stucco and marble preceded by a gate in piperno performed by Torchese.

Between 1750 and 1760, he was active in the design and construction the church of the Annunciation in Giugliano in Campania and the main of the church of Giugliano. In 1758, in Naples, he helped complete the church of the Santissima Immacolata Concezione di Maria e San Vincenzo Ferrera (Chiesa dell'Immacolata e San Vincenzo) and a screen house in Via San Vincenzo, on the left of the church. In 1766, he worked on lava formed routes along the Via Foria leading to the Albergo Reale dei Poveri in Naples. He also worked on the facade of the church of the Immaculate Conception (also called the Le Crocelle) at via Chiatamone in Naples. In 1769, he worked with Carlo Zoccoli and Gaetano Barba in studying the collapse of the façade of the Palazzo del Banco and its oratory. He worked in 1769–1770 on the reconstruction of the facade of the church of the Pietà dei Turchini, and in 1771, with Felice Bottiglieri, he was appointed auditor of Archconfraternity of the church of Santissima Trinità dei Pellegrini in Naples.
