= Palazzo Pignatelli di Monteleone, Naples =

Coordinates: 40.846624°N 14.251333°E

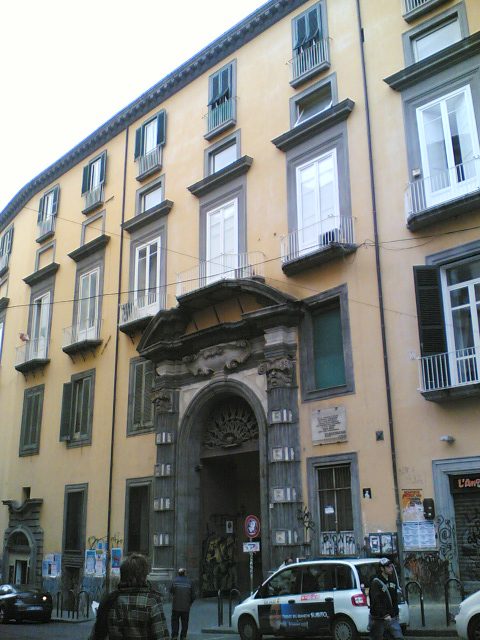
Palace facade

The Palazzo Pignatelli di Monteleone is a monumental aristocratic palace located on the calata Trinità maggiore number 2, in central Naples, province of Campania, Italy. The facade is at the edge of the Piazza del Gesu Nuovo.

== History ==
The palace was first erected in the 16th century by the Pignatelli family di Monteleone (today Vibo Valentia). The design was commissioned mainly from Giovanni Vincenzo Della Monica. A major refurbishment, commissioned by Duke Nicolo Pignatelli and designed by Ferdinando Sanfelice, was completed in 1718. The main portal is made of white marble and piperno rock with flanking columns with masks serving as capitals.

The palace once held frescoes (1718) by Paolo de Matteis. As stated by a marble plaque on the facade, the painter Edgar Degas would visit frequently and stay in this palace, which was acquired by Edgar's grandfather, Rene Hilary Degas.

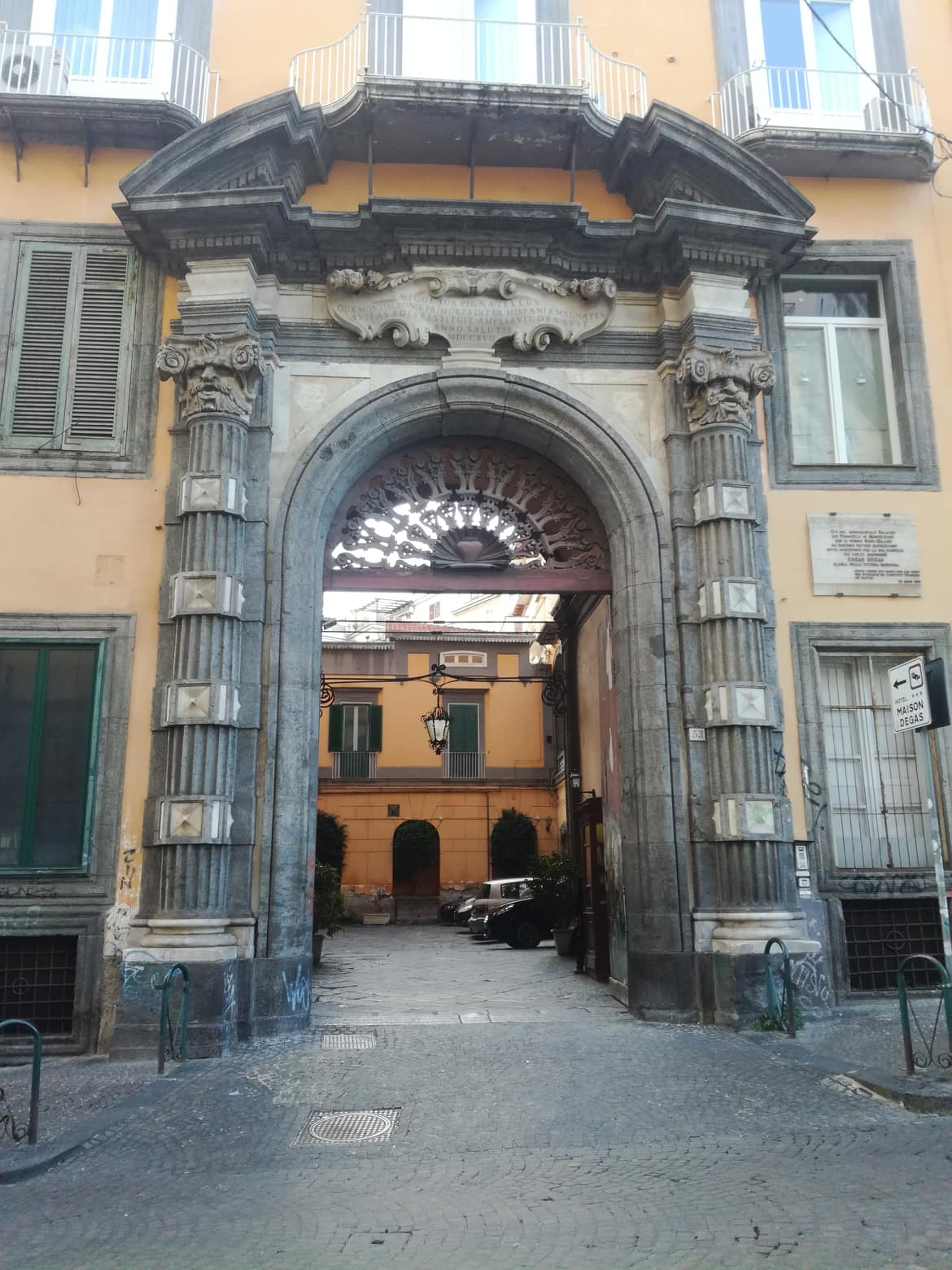
Portal

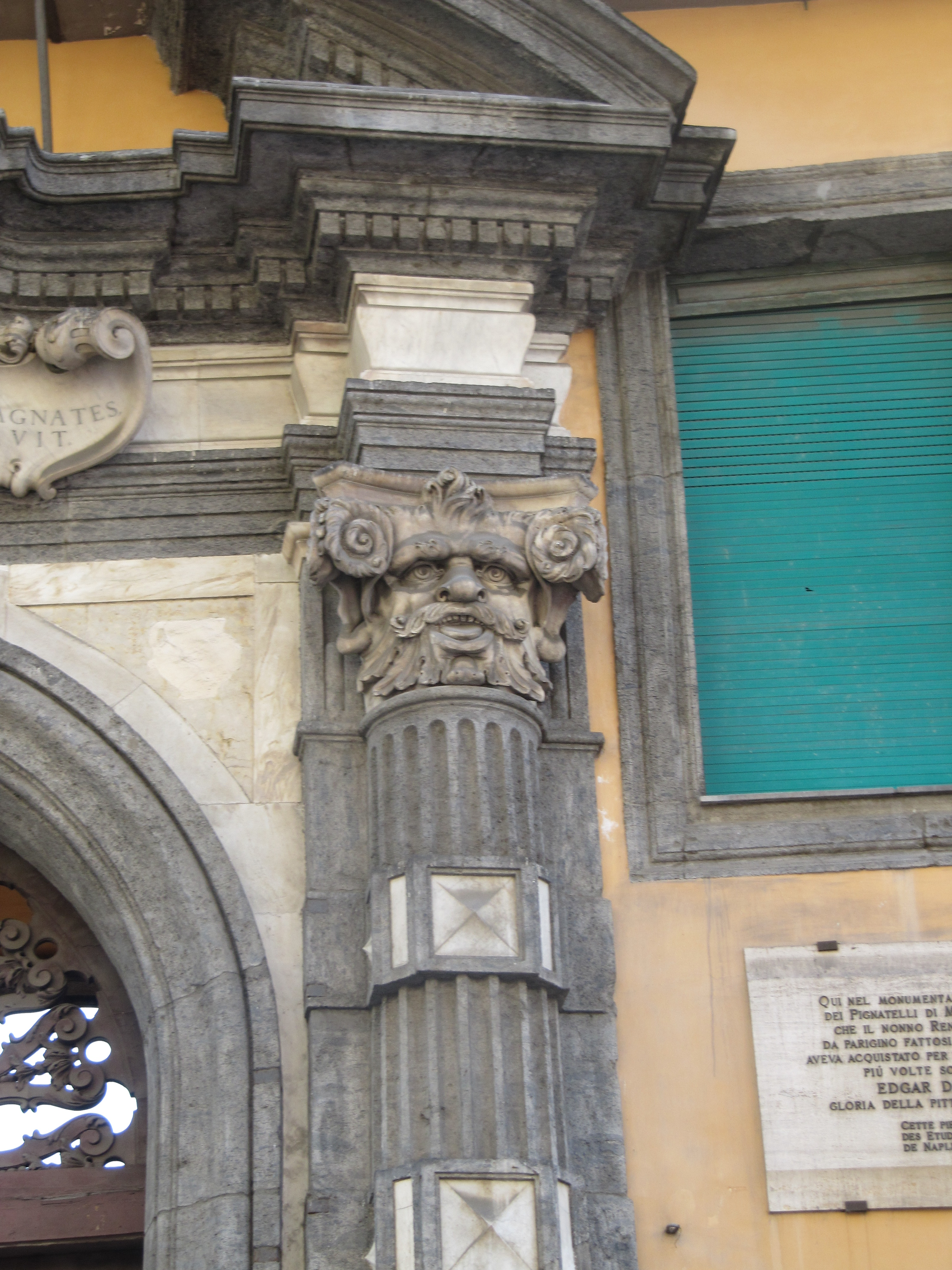
Column capitals
