= Santa Maria a Sicola =

Church building in Naples, Italy

The chapel of Santa Maria a Sicola is a small Roman Catholic medieval chapel, off Via Giudecca Vecchia, in the neighborhood of Forcella, in the Quartieri Pendino of Naples, Italy.

== History ==
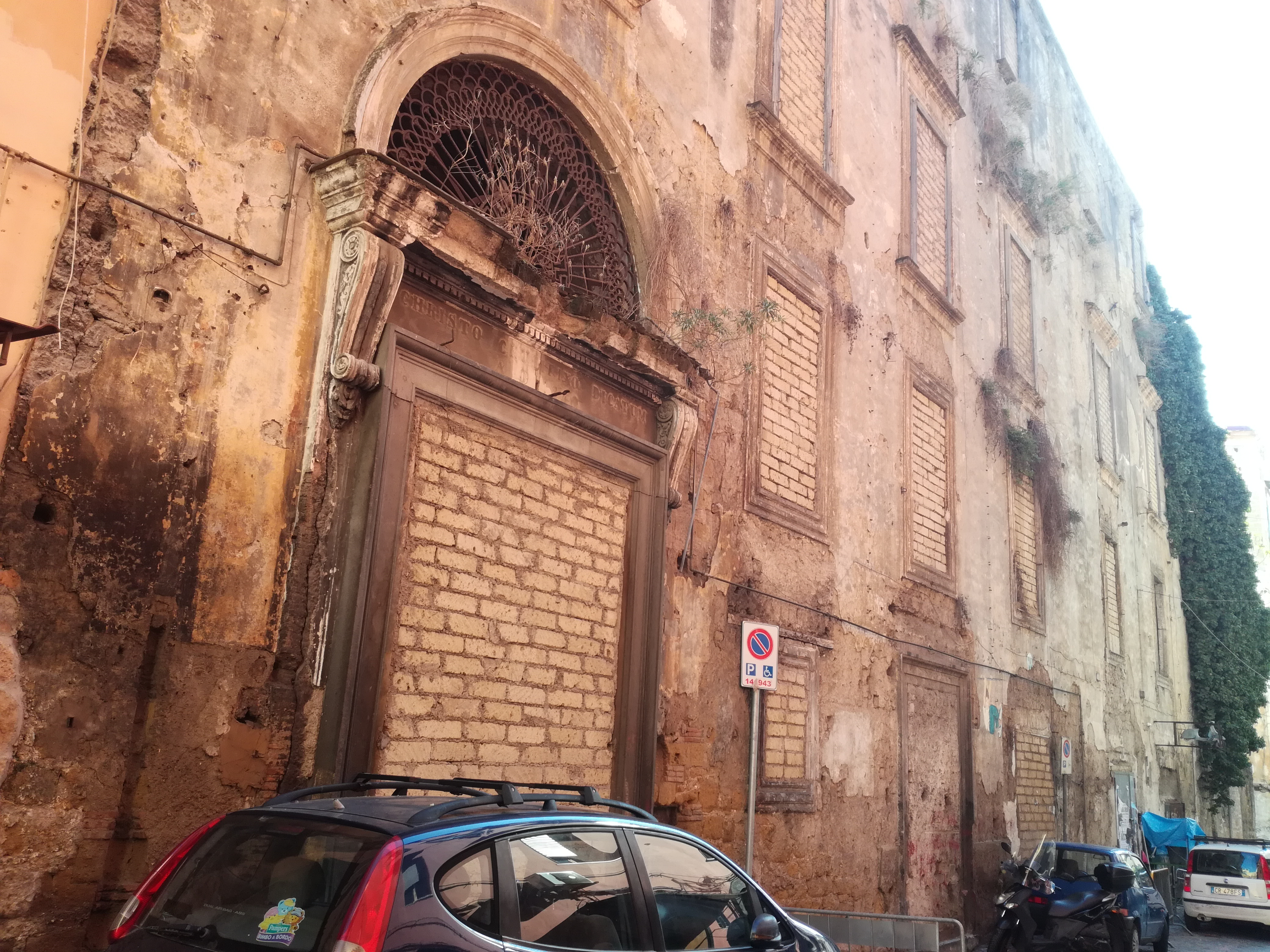
Maria a Sicola - Roman Catholic medieval chapel

The chapel and adjacent monastery were commissioned in 1275 by the High Protonotary of King Charles I of Anjou, Pier Leone or Peronelle Sicola or Sicula. This nobleman also founded the adjacent church of San Nicola de' Caserti. This chapel was favored by the Angevin kings, and was also later endowed by King Ladislaus. The nunnery, called a conservatory for aristocratic women, housed an order that took care of orphans.

In 1722, putatively to the maleficent humors of the region, the orphanage was transferred to the Sanità district, where it mutated the name to Santa Maria Antesaecula. In 1824, the chapel was granted to the confraternity of San Nicodemo dei Paratori or Apparatori (St Nicodemus of the Guild of the Stage Hands). After this time, the interior frescoes were lost. The church had two plaques: one recalling a consecration by a pope Clement (III?), another the burial of Dade of Antwerp. The interior artwork has also been removed.

The chapel, despite its antiquity, has been poorly cared for and severely dilapidated, and serves as a warehouse of building supplies and workshop.
