= San Francesco delle Monache =

Church in Naples, Italy

Coordinates: 40.847241°N 14.253519°E

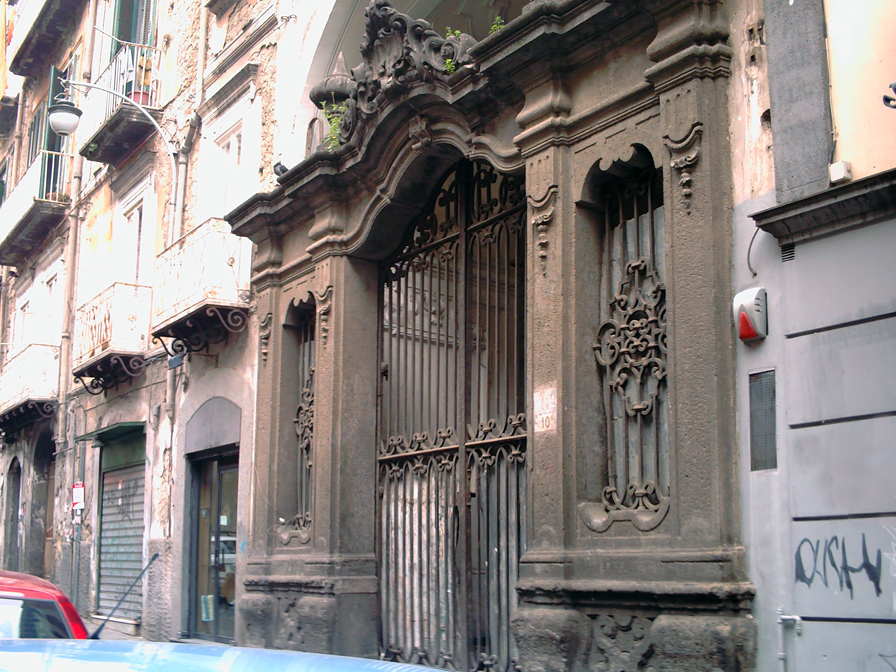
Portal in piperno rock

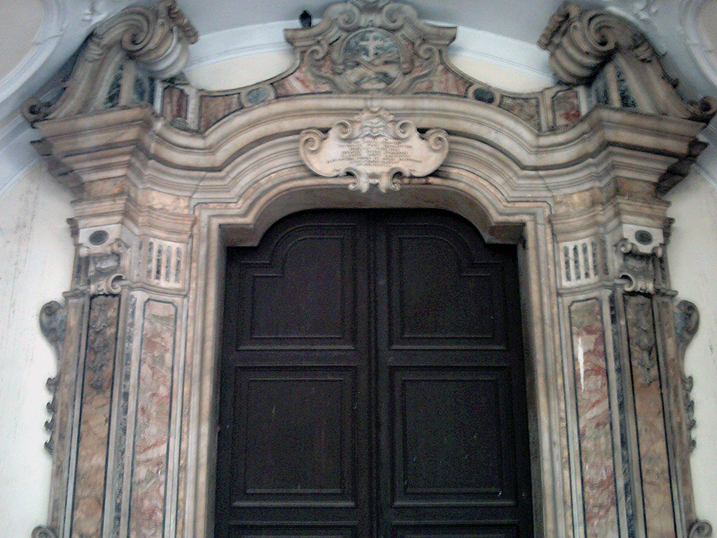
Portico of Atrium

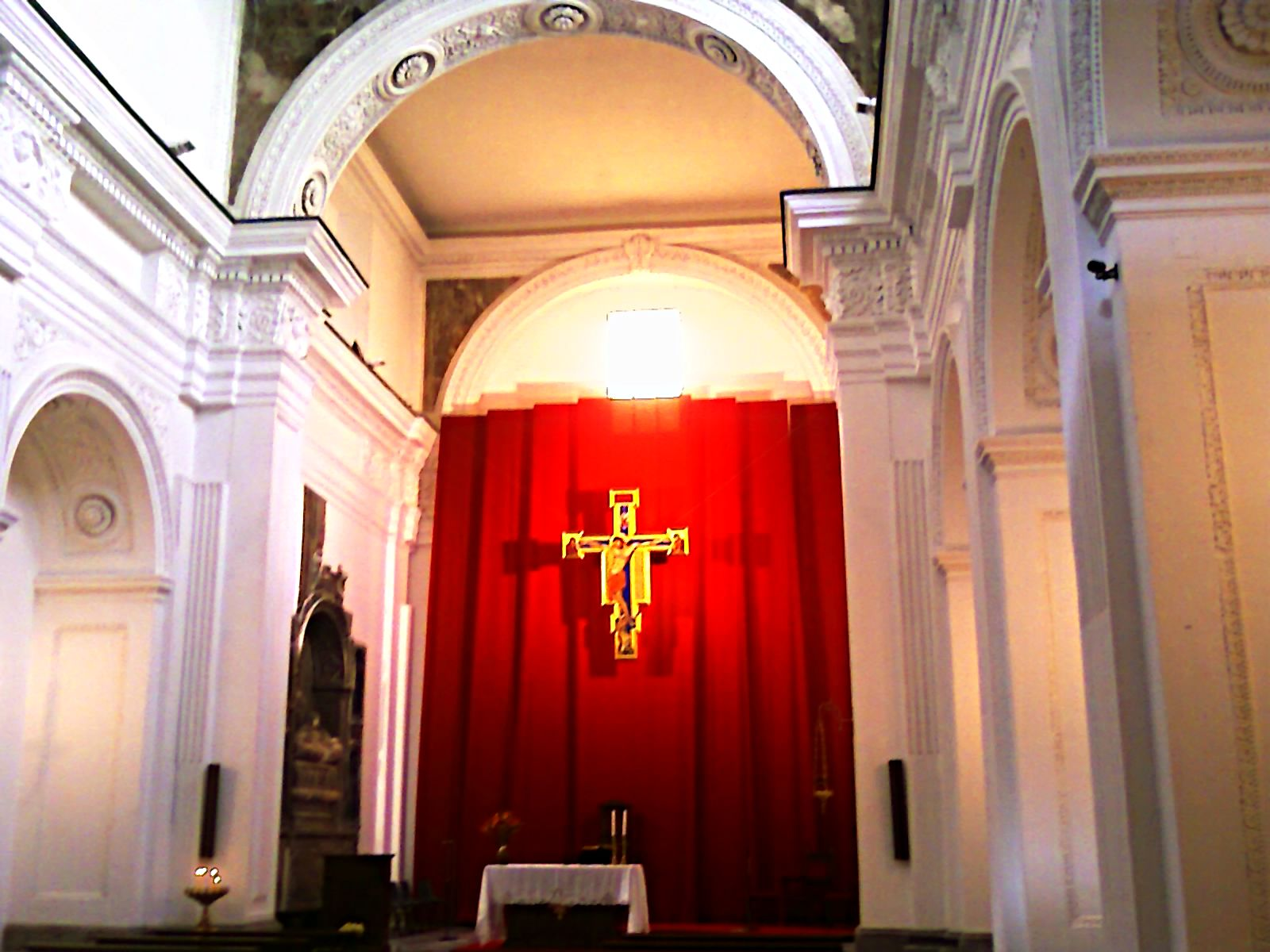
Nave

San Francesco delle Monache is a Baroque-style church located in via Santa Chiara, in Naples, Italy.

== History ==
A church at the site was first constructed for the nuns of an Order of St Clare in the 14th century by Robert of Anjou and his wife. His wife, once widowed, entered this monastery. The Blessed Costanza Starace also once resided here. The initial layout was attributed to Masuccio II, but further reconstructions and decorations proceeded in 1646 and 1750. The architects Bartolomeo Vecchione and Crescenzo Torchese were involved in the latter reconstructions, including the facade. Much of the artwork has been moved or lost. The ceiling canvases in the nave were attributed to Balducci and his disciples. Other works made for the church or chapels were attributed to Andrea Malinconico; Giovanni Battista Caracciolo; a Virgin with St Anthony of Padua and Elizabeth of Hungary by Antonio Stabile, pupil of Silvestro Bruno; and a Virgin of the Rosary with St Domenic, Rose, Gennaro, and Barbara by Giacinto Popoli, pupil of Massimo Stanzione.

Suppressed in 1805, the Complex has recently become a school. Torchese completed the interior polychrome marble decorations of the church. The church now hosts the "Domus Ars" Cultural center.

== Bibliography ==
- Vincenzo Regina, Le chiese di Napoli. Viaggio indimenticabile attraverso la storia artistica, architettonica, letteraria, civile e spirituale della Napoli sacra, Newton e Compton editore, Napoli 2004.
