= Santa Maria del Faro =

Church in Naples, Italy

Coordinates: 40.795750°N 14.191350°E

Santa Maria del Faro is a church in the quartiere of Posillipo of Naples, Italy.

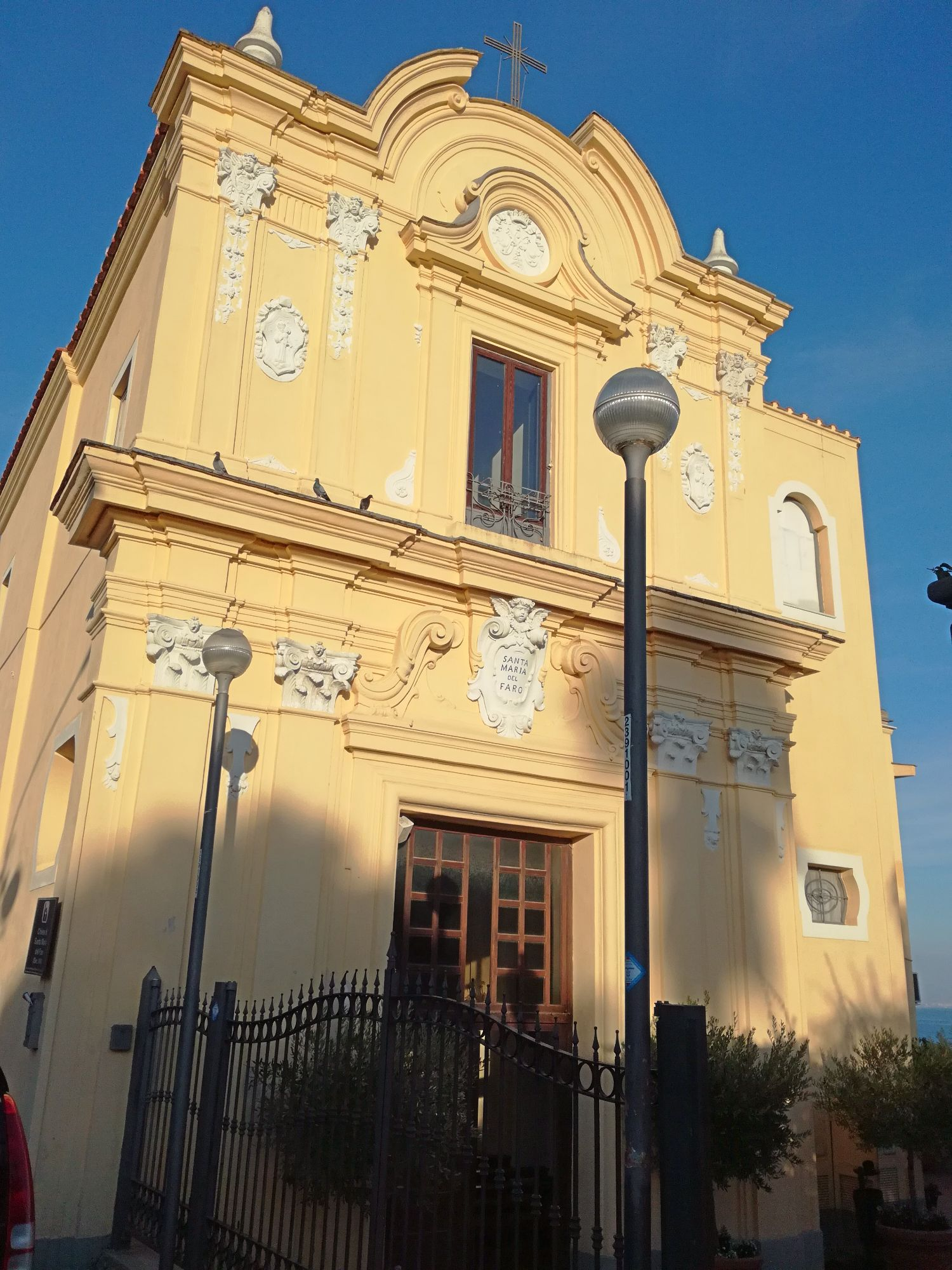
Baroque Facade

A church was founded here in the 13th century and restored in the 18th century using designs by Ferdinando Sanfelice and under the patronage of the Mazza family. The Baroque church incorporates small fragments of Roman sarcophagi. It contains fragments of the Roman Villa of Pausylipon, which was the site of a Roman lighthouse; hence the name Santa Maria del Faro, "Saint Mary of the lighthouse".

== Bibliography ==
- Napoli e dintorni, Touring Club Italia, Touring Editore, 2001.
- Exterior of Church
