= Palazzo San Felice, Naples =

Coordinates: 40.857580°N 14.251400°E

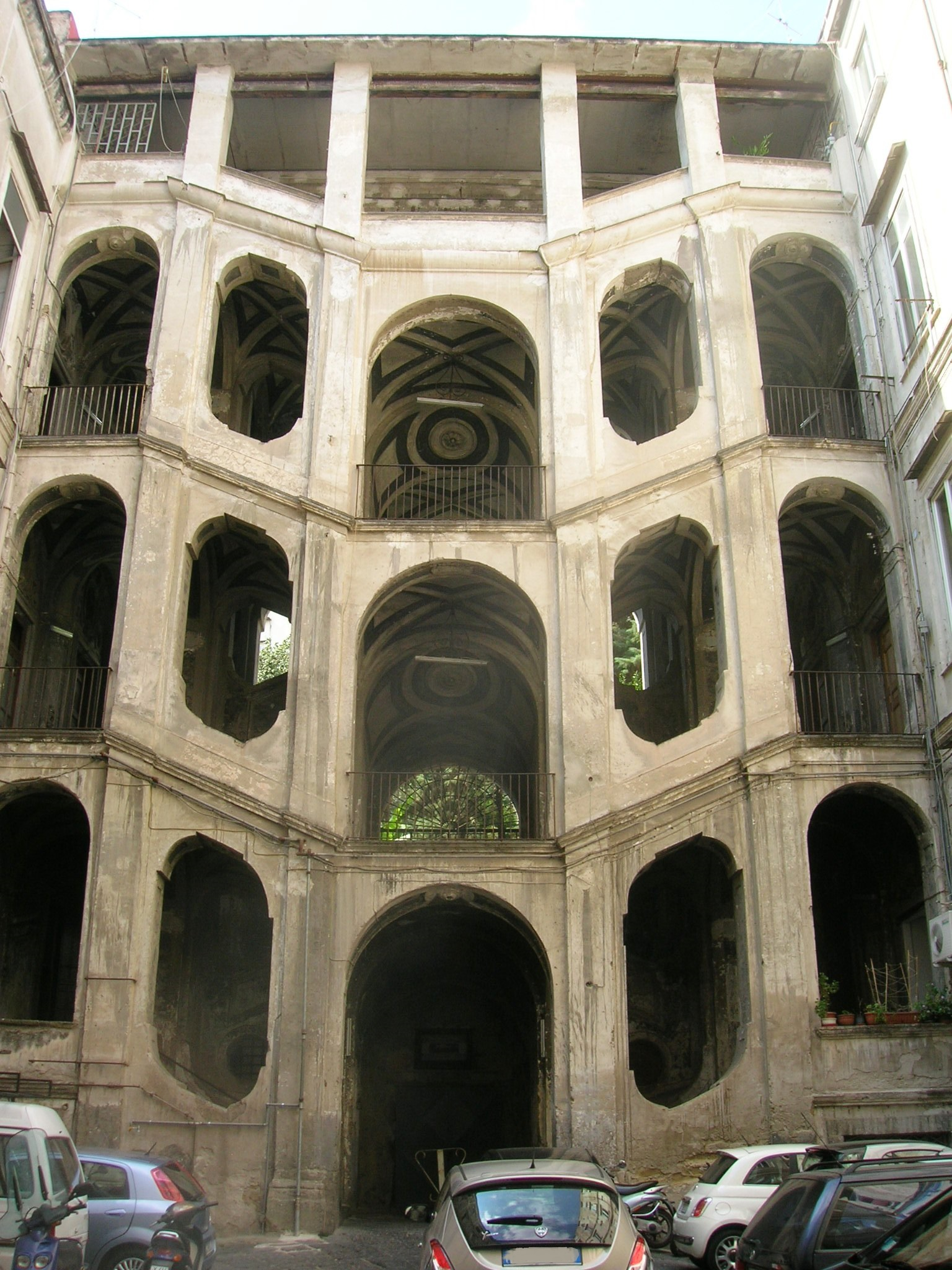
Courtyard staircases of Palazzo Sanfelice

The San Felice or Sanfelice Palace (Italian: Palazzo San Felice) is a Rococo or late-Baroque-style palace at Via Sanità 167 in Rione Sanità in central Naples. It is best known for its elaborate staircase.

== History ==
The Palace was erected during 1724 to 1726 by the architect Ferdinando Sanfelice. The entrance portal has two stucco sirens of the Sanfelice family. Through an indistinct façade one enters to an interior octagonal courtyard leads to a double ramp stairwell. The interior frescoes originally by Francesco Solimena are now lost. The staircases with arches in shifting planes still grants an aura of complex scenography, despite its present cramped and dilapidated state: a grandiose entrance leading only to a decrepit palace. The nearby Palazzo dello Spagnolo is attributed to the same architect and has similar staircases.

== Gallery ==
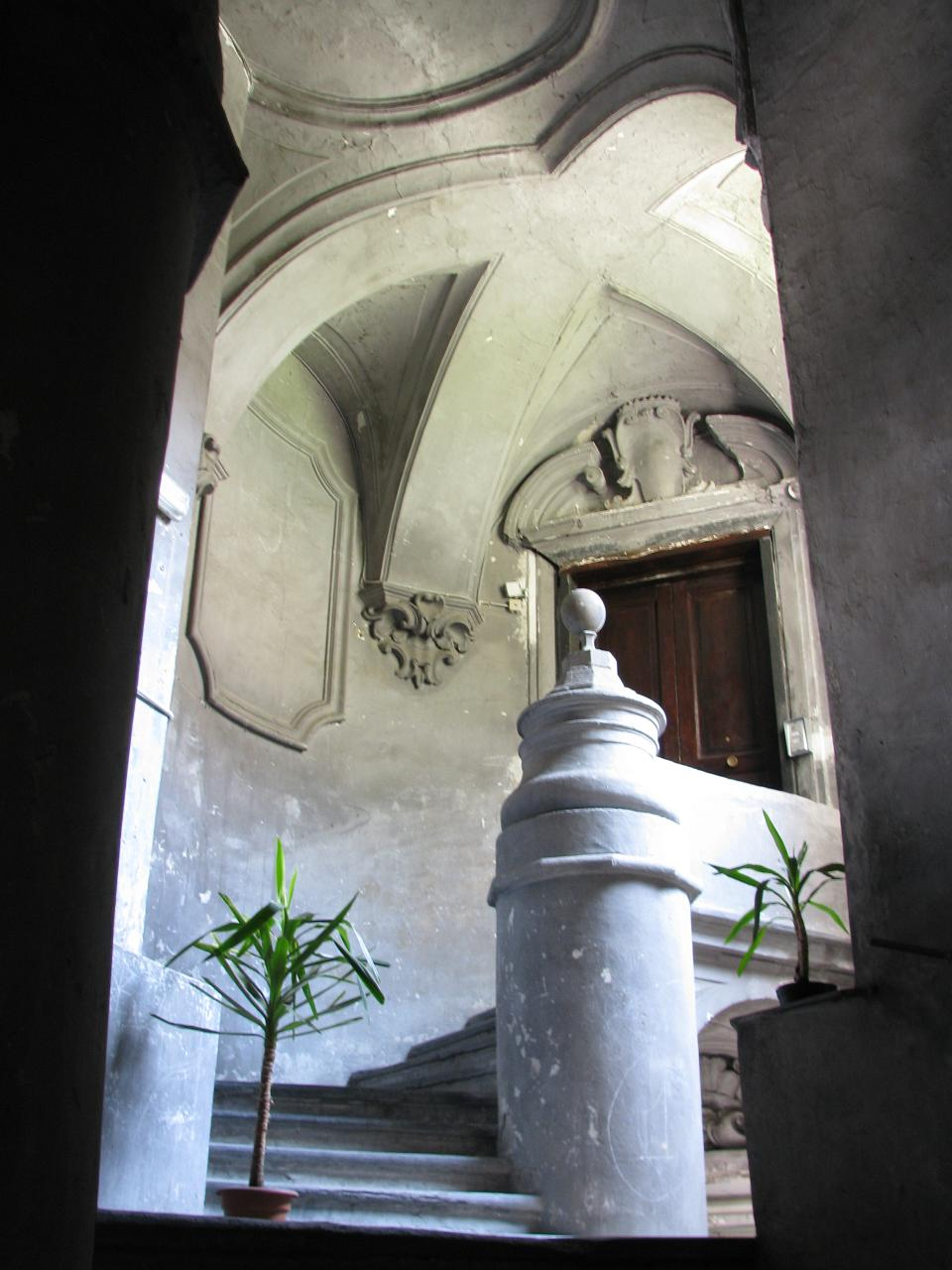
Internal staircase

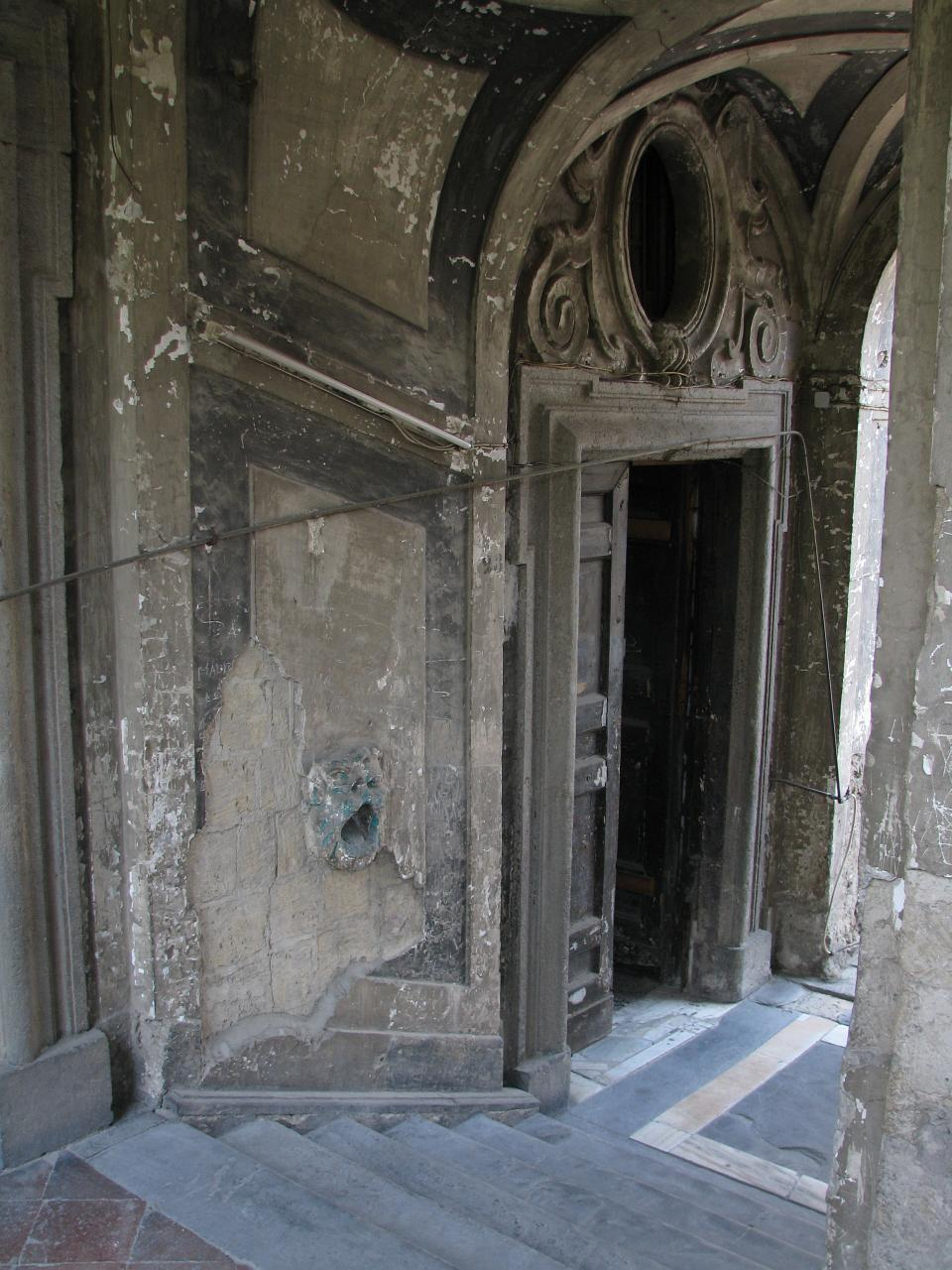
Interior stucco decoration
