= Santa Maria dei Vergini =

Church in Naples

Coordinates: 40.8571°N 14.2546°E

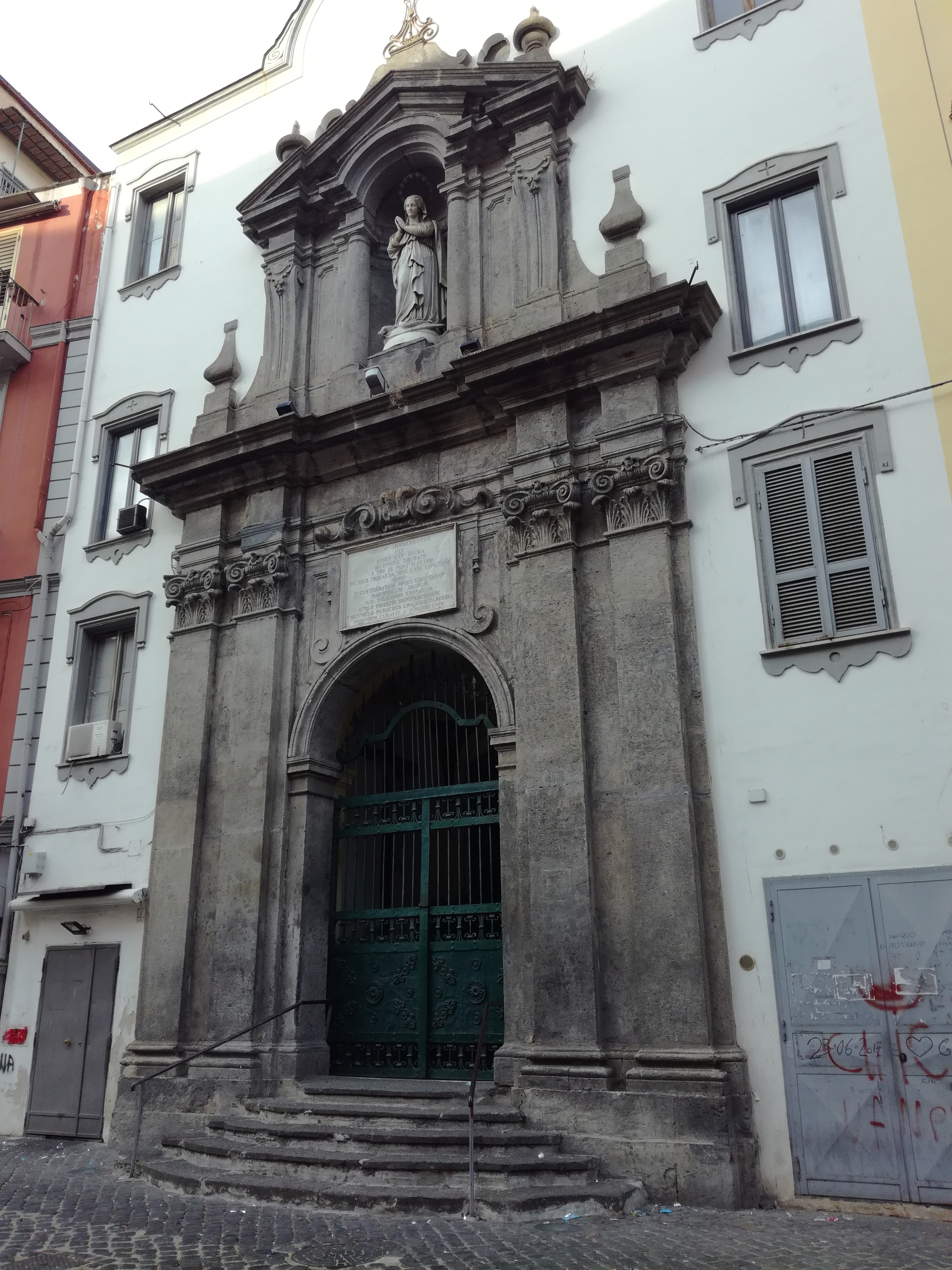
Facade

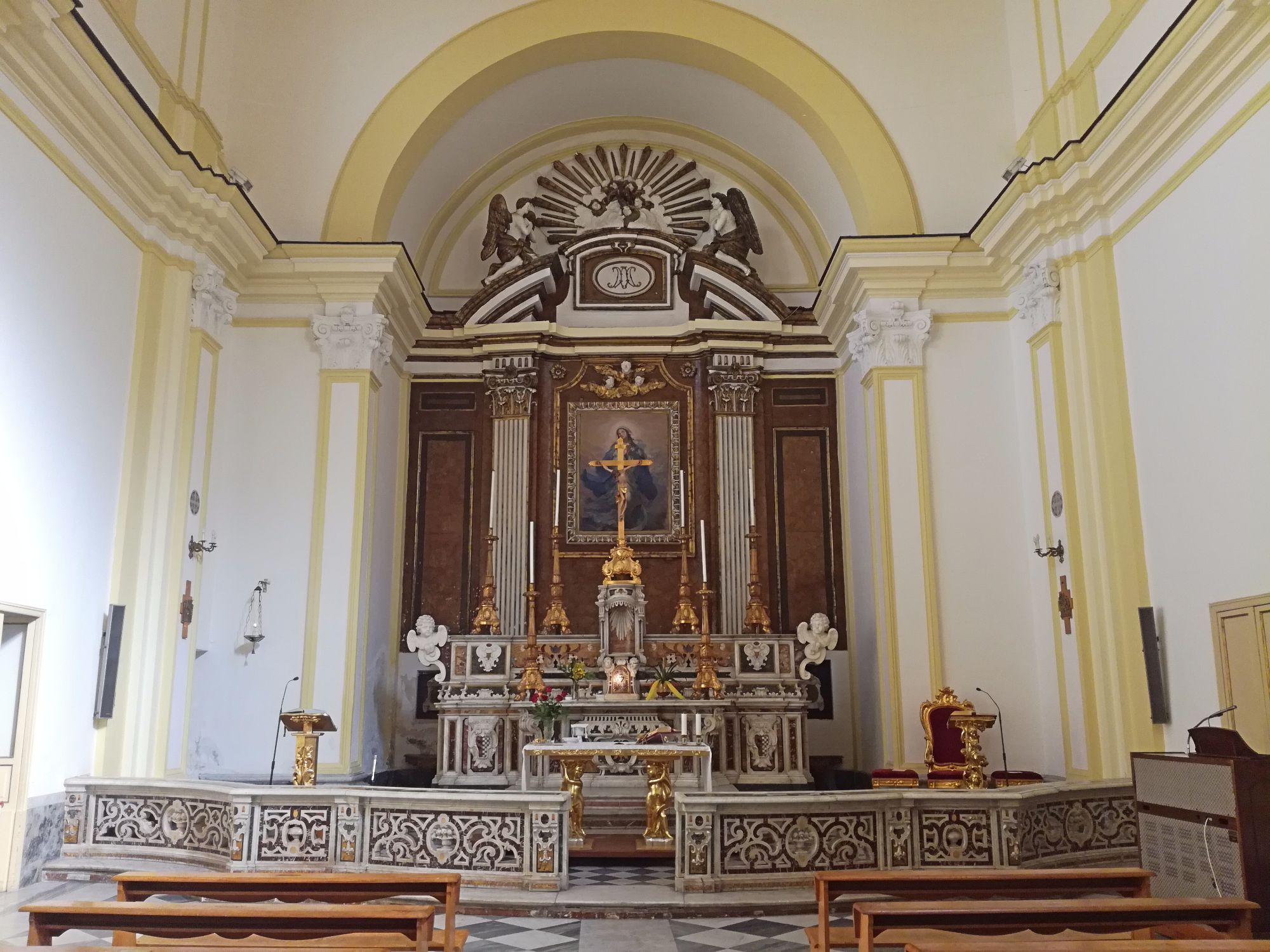
Altar

Santa Maria dei Vergini is a church in central Naples, Italy, in the Rione of the Sanità.

== History ==
In 1326, a church and an adjacent hospital and monastery, titled Santa Maria del Borgo de' Vergini, were erected by residents of the Rione of Porta San Gennaro. Assigned to Padri Crucifero, the Cardinal Innico Caracciolo ceded the property to the Congregation of the Mission (Padri della Missione), after it became a parish church. In 1788, the church was rebuilt in its elliptical interior on designs by Luigi Vanvitelli.

Before the war, the main altarpiece by Francesco la Mura depicted a Glory of St Vincent de Paul. Among the chapels, was a canvas depicting a Holy Family, St. Jeanne de Chantal with St Vincent de Paul (1758) by Severino Galante. The church also had works by Giovanni Sarnelli. All were destroyed in a bombing in 1943. The marble sculpture of the Immaculate Conception (1858) on the facade was made by Francesco Liberti and Giuseppe Pirotti.
