= Palazzo dello Spagnolo, Naples =

Coordinates: 40.8568°N 14.2544°E

The Palazzo dello Spagnolo is a Rococo or late-Baroque-style palace in Rione Sanità in central Naples. It is best known for its elaborate staircase.

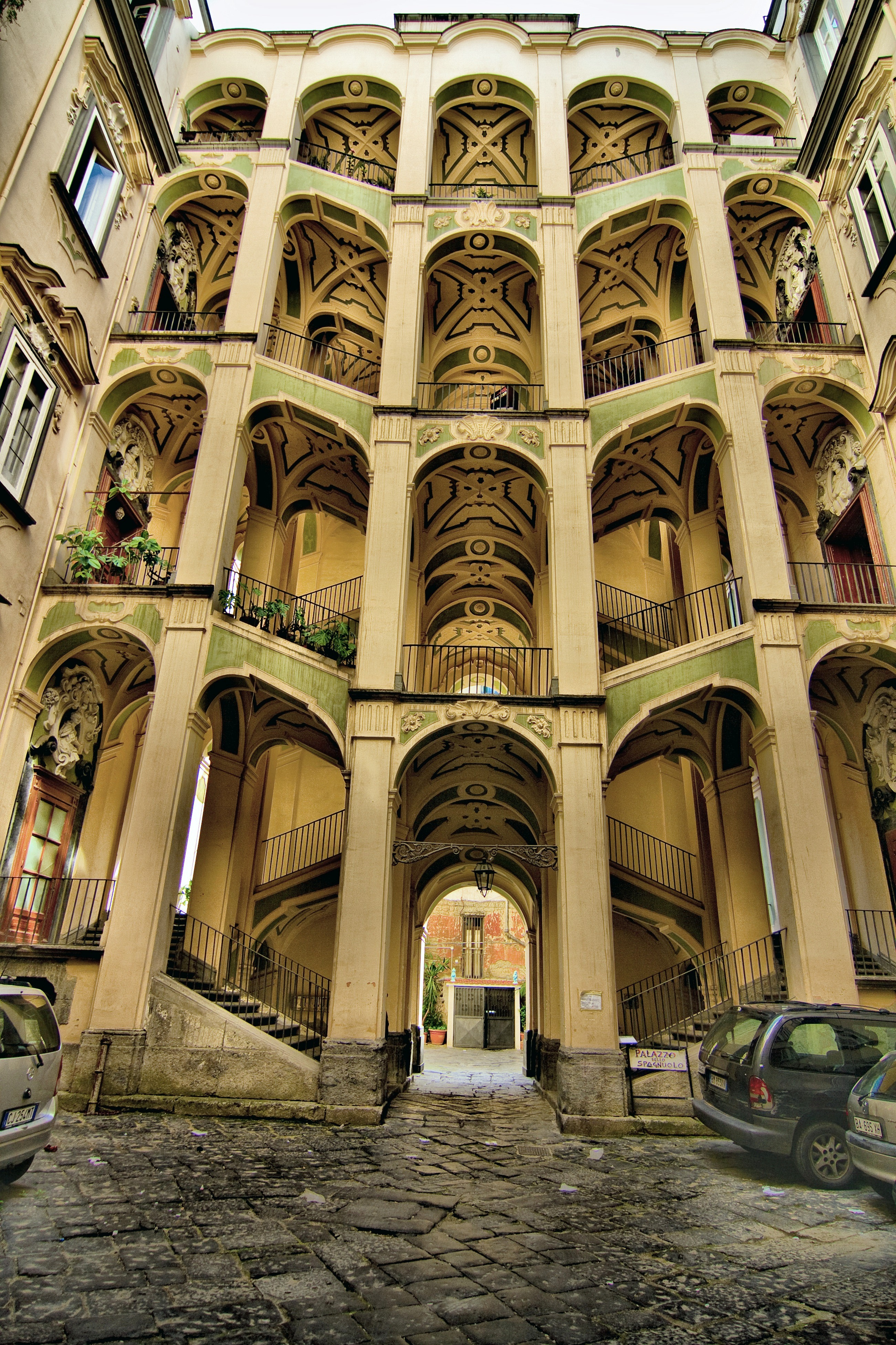
Courtyard staircases of Palazzo dello Spagnolo

== History ==
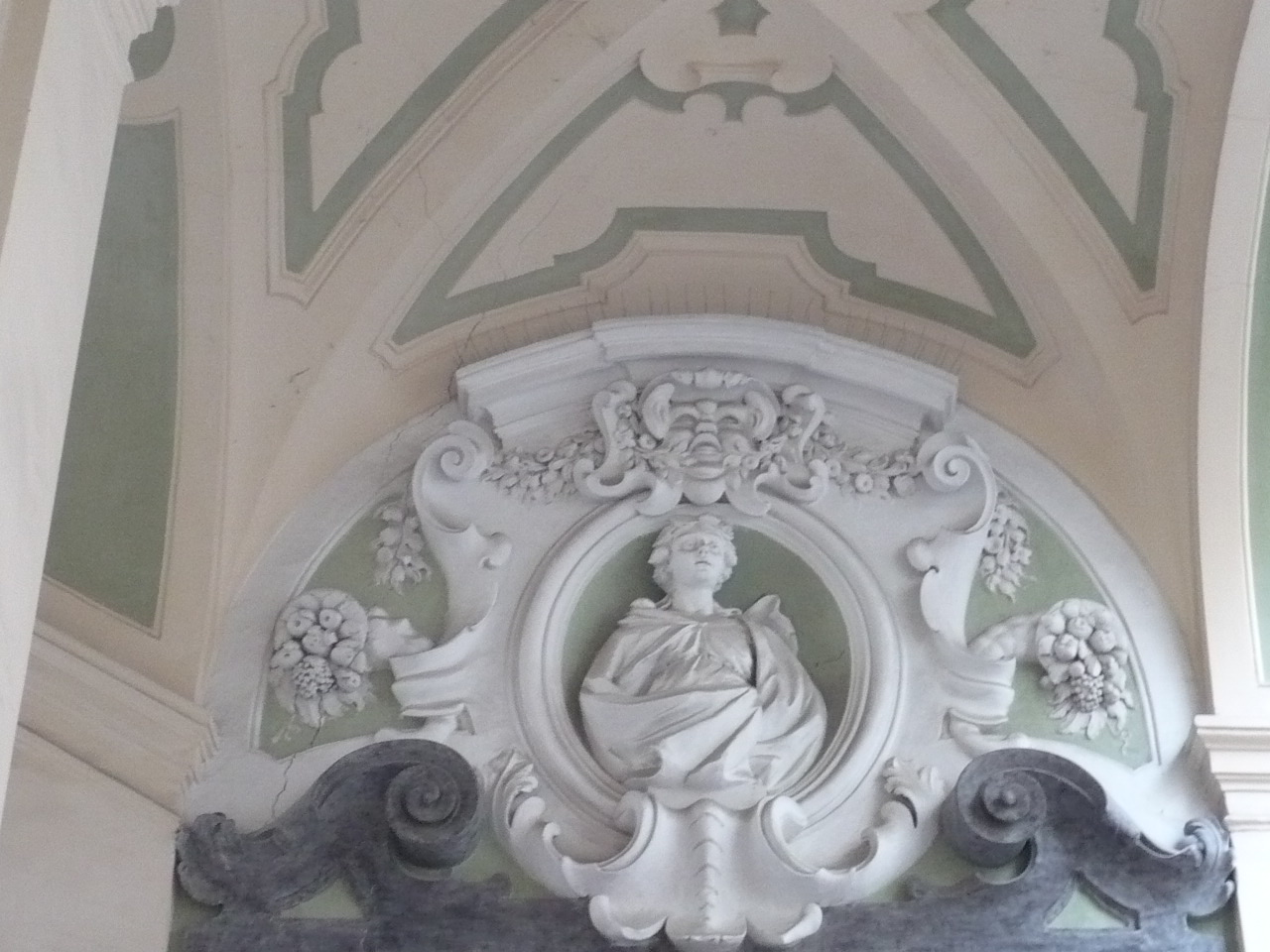
Stucco work over interior doors.

The Palace was erected during 1738, commissioned by the Marchese di Poppano, Nicola Moscati, and is attributed to the architect Ferdinando Sanfelice. Through an indistinct façade one enters to an interior octagonal courtyard leads to a double ramp stairwell. The interior was richly stuccoed by Aniello Prezioso, using designs by Francesco Attanasio in 1742. The top floor was added at the end of the 18th century. In the following century, the family sold apartments in the lower floors to Tommaso Atienza, nicknamed lo Spagnolo (the Spaniard), whence the name of the palace.

The staircases with arches in shifting planes still grants an aura of complex scenography, despite its present cramped and dilapidated state: a grandiose entrance leading only to a decrepit palace. The nearby Palazzo San Felice is attributed to the same architect and has similar staircases.
