= Immacolata e San Vincenzo =

Church in Naples, Italy

Coordinates: 40.860460°N 14.247340°E

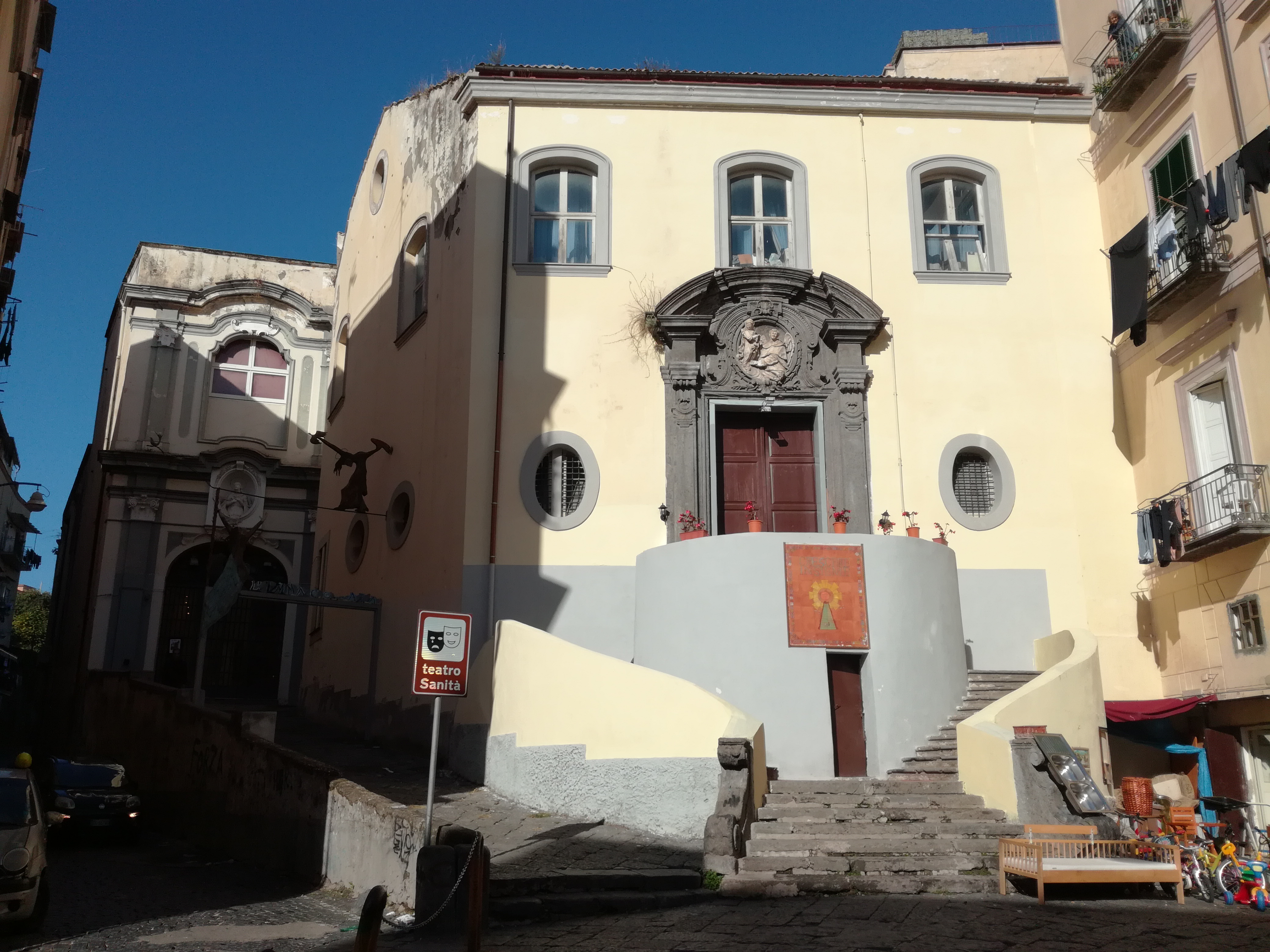
Facade

The Church of the Immacolata e San Vincenzo and its adjacent convent, are religious buildings in piazzetta San Vincenzo of the Rione Sanità of Naples, Italy.

It was founded in the 8th century by father Gregorio Maria Rocco of Chiaia. It was erected at the site of an earlier church, titled ‘’Santa Maria di Nazareth’’. In 1758, the church along with houses on left side were reconstructed in a Baroque style using designs by Bartolomeo Vecchione. In the catacombs are buried corpses from the plague of 1656. The interior has a canvas by Pietro Bardellino, depicting St Vincenzo recommends orphans to the Virgin Vergine, (1754). The presbytery is stuccoed in the 18th century, and holds the tomb of Sabato Manso (1747), who was the patron for the latter reconstruction.

It was closed for worship in 1861 and was reopened in 1975. It was deconsecrated in 1984. Since 2013 the church hosts a theatre, the "Nuovo Teatro Sanità".

== Bibliography ==
- Antonio Terraciano, Andrea Russo, Le chiese di Napoli. Censimento e brevi recensioni delle 448 chiese storiche della città di Napoli, Lorenzo Giunta Editore, 1999.
