= Rione Sanità =

Neighbourhood in Naples, Italy

Coordinates: 40.8593°N 14.2491°E

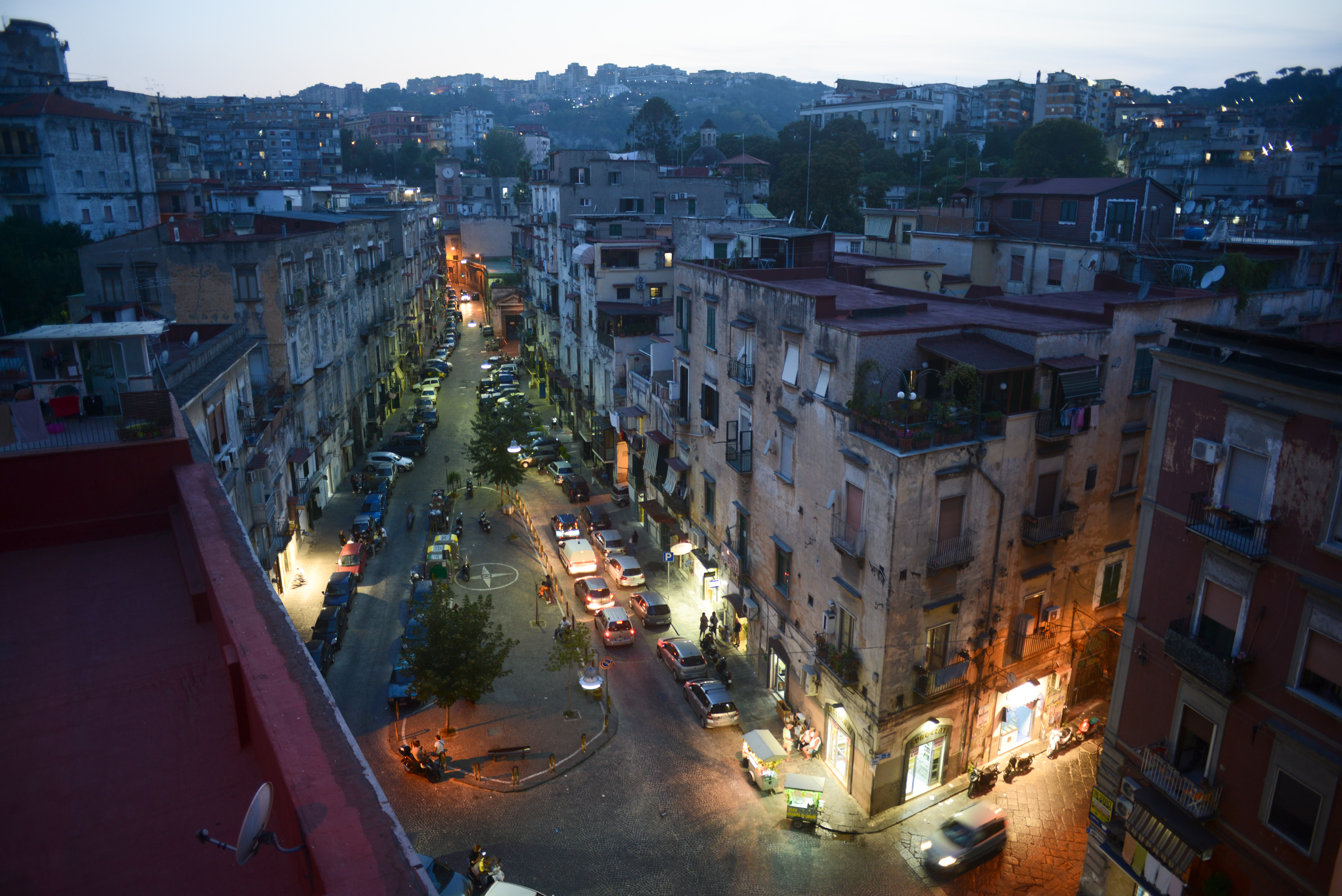
Rione Sanità

Rione Sanità (literally "Health Neighbourhood" in Italian) is a neighbourhood in Naples, part of the Stella quarter. It is located north of Naples' historical centre, adjacent to the Capodimonte hill.

== History ==
What is now Rione Sanità was a burial place in Roman and Hellenistic times, as witnessed by the discovery of Hellenistic hypogea and Paleochristian catacombs. The area was settled in the late 16th Century. Some local traditions and places, such as the rite of the Pezzentelle (see below), witness a cultural attitude towards death that may be related to the area's original use.

While the settlement in Rione Sanità was originally established as a home for noble and rich families of Naples' aristocracy (as witnessed by palazzi such as Palazzo Sanfelice and Palazzo dello Spagnolo), the area eventually turned into one of the most infamous and degraded of Naples. Unemployment, poverty, and the widespread presence of Camorra have long characterized the quarter. The dramatic situation of the area has attracted volunteer and humanitarian efforts, such as those of the Comboni Missionaries that have been operating for years in support of Rione Sanità's population.

== The rite of the "pezzentelle" ==
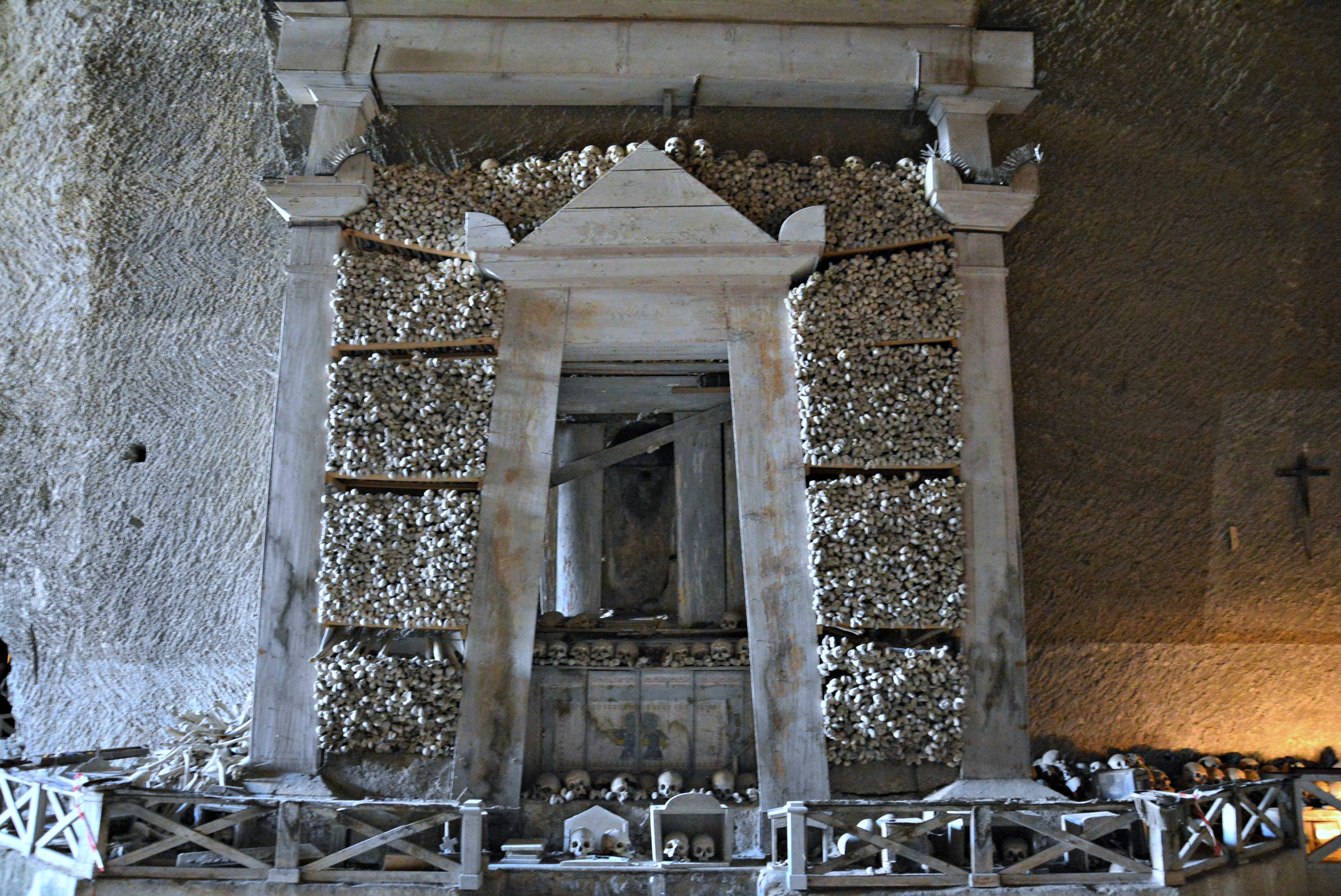
The "pezzentelle" cult

One of the most peculiar traits of Rione della Sanità is a unique cult and ritual that takes place in the ossuary of the Fontanelle cemetery. The cult dates back to the 17th Century and involves the ritual burning of candles dedicated to the so-called "pezzentelle" ("little wretches"), i.e., the soul of the "nameless dead" whose bones are preserved in the ossuary. More specifically, Neapolitan families traditionally "choose" one specific skull from the ossuary and take care of it (cleaning it up, repositioning it properly in the ossuary, and so on), with the intent that the "adopted" nameless soul will repay those attentions with good luck and blessings. While the cult has a general Catholic frame (as the "pezzentelle" are usually identified as Purgatory souls), many of its elements are rather pagan in nature, so that it can be classified as a syncretic cult.

== Historical buildings ==
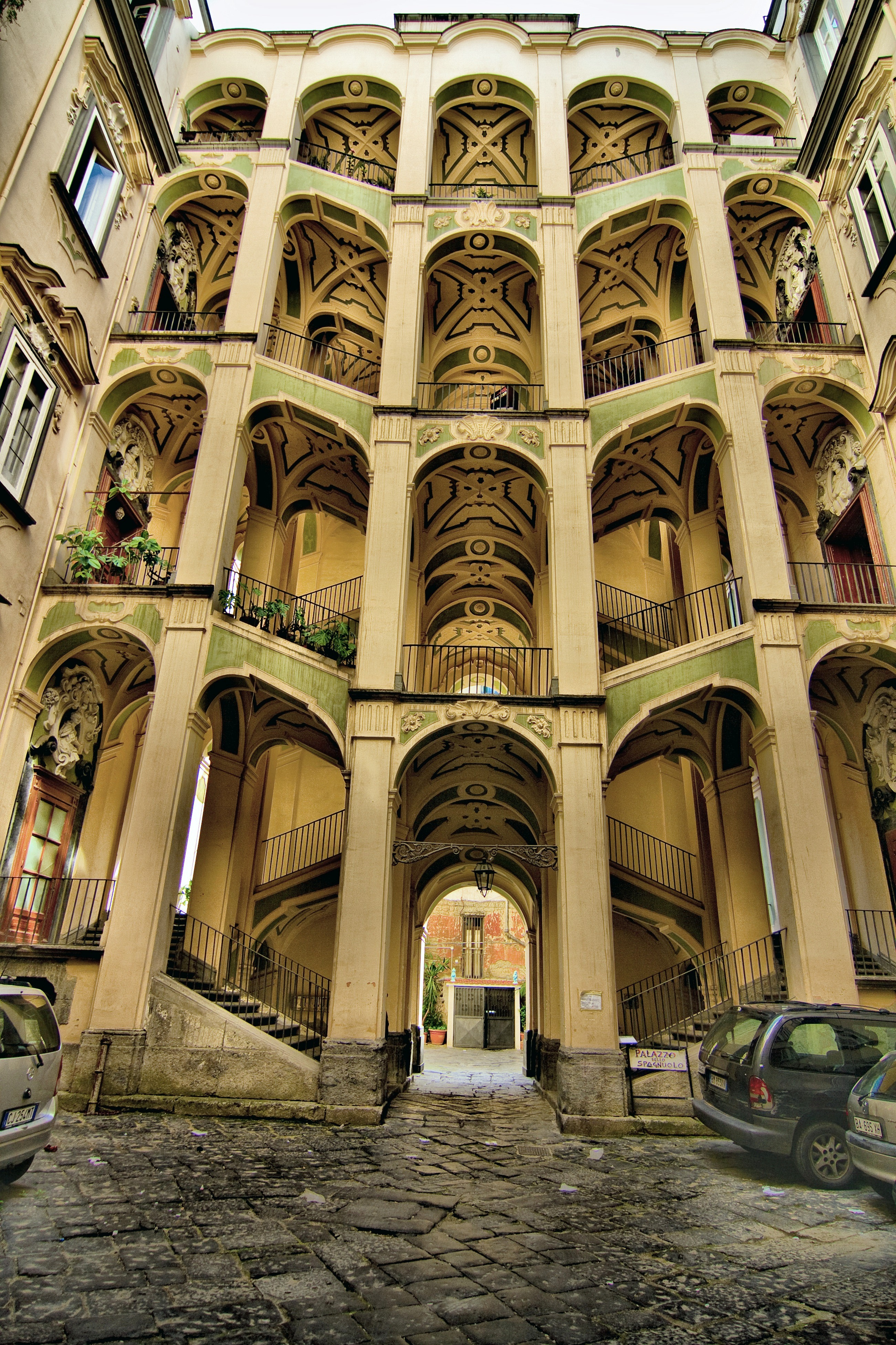
Facade of Palazzo dello Spagnolo

- Ospedale di San Gennaro dei Poveri
- Palazzo dello Spagnolo
- Palazzo di Majo
- Palazzo Sanfelice
- Palazzo Traetto

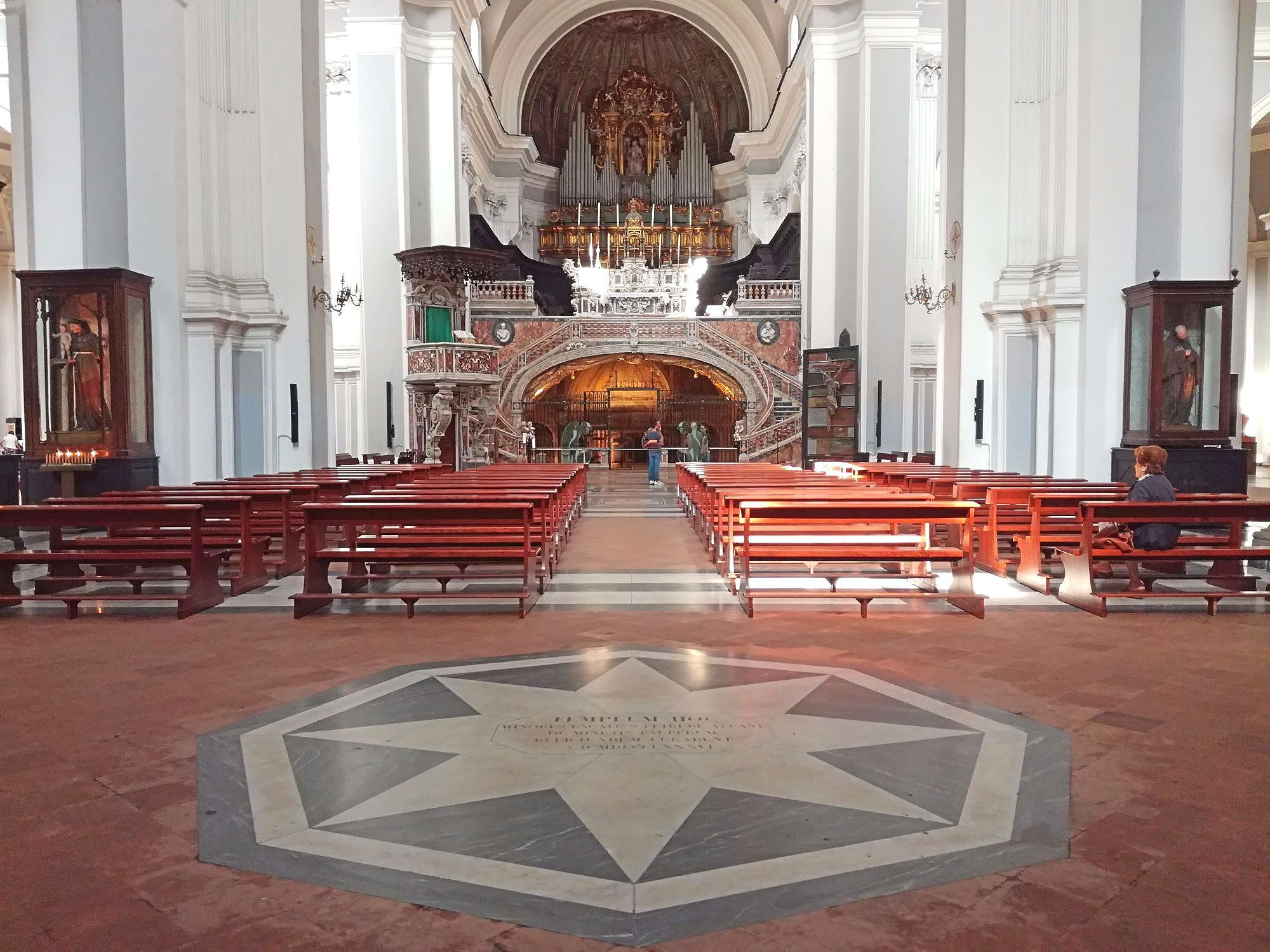
Santa Maria della Sanità

- Basilica of San Gennaro extra Moenia
- Chiesa del Santissimo Crocifisso ad Antesaecula
- Church of Santa Maria Antesaecula
- Church of Santa Maria della Sanità
- Chiesa di Santa Maria della Vita
- Church of the Immacolata e San Vincenzo
- Chiesa di Sant'Aspreno ai Crociferi
- Chiesa di Santa Maria della Misericordia ai Vergini
- Church of Santa Maria dei Vergini
- Chiesa della Missione ai Vergini
- Chiesa di Santa Maria Succurre Miseris ai Vergini
- Church of San Severo fuori le mura
- Cloister of Santa Maria alla Sanità
- Chiesa di Santa Maria dei Cristallini
- Complesso dei Cinesi

== Notable people ==
Probably the most famous person from Rione Sanità was the 20th Century actor, poet, singer, and writer Totò, who was born in Via (street) Santa Maria Antesaecula.

== References in popular culture ==
As Rione Sanità is somewhat a symbol of the poorest, most degraded (but also most "picturesque") character of Naples, the place is widely referenced in popular culture. In particular, it was chosen as a setting for a number of movies from the Italian neorealism era. Movies set in Rione Sanità include Vittorio de Sica's The Gold of Naples (1954) and Yesterday, Today and Tomorrow (1963). Another notable portrait of Rione Sanità in art is Eduardo De Filippo's play Il sindaco del rione Sanità. Also the film Nostalgia (2022), written and directed by Mario Martone based on a novel by Ermanno Rea, and starring Pierfrancesco Favino, takes place in La Sanita.
