= Carlo Zoccoli =

Italian architect, engineer, and scientific writer

Carlo Zoccoli (1718–1771) was an Italian architect, engineer, and scientific writer, active mainly in Southern Italy.

He was born in Naples. At the age of seventeen, he entered the corps of engineers of the Kingdom of Naples, and very soon became master of fortifications. Due to a delicate constitution, he quit the military, and devoted himself to the civil architecture, and published a treatise entitled Della Servitu. He published a work titled Della gravitazione dei corpi e della forza dei fluidi (On the Gravitation of Bodies, and the Power of Fluids). He was chosen by the deputies of the city Examinatore de' Tavolari of the S. R. Council.

His architectural works include: the cathedral, seminary, and episcopal palace of Calvi; the convent of the Alcanterini, on the mountain of Pignatoro; the church and convent of the Capuchins in Arienzo; the church and baronial palace in Cutignano, near Nola; the monastery and church of the Religiosi in San Giorgio, in the territory of Benevento; the villas of the prince of Supino at Portici, and of the Marquis of Palomba at Cesa, near to Aversa.

He constructed two windmills at Capua, on the Volturno, where he adopted the mechanics of Dutch mills on canals were adopted; he also erected nine other mills at Scilla in Calabria, where he also designed a spacious church, and restored the castle, which was completed by his son, Don Raffaello Zoccoli.

== Sources ==
- Francesco, Milizia (1826). Translated by Mrs. Edward Cresy (ed.). The lives of celebrated architects, ancient and modern, Volume 2 . London: Printed by J. Moyes, Bouverie Street; for J. Taylor, Architectural library, High Holborn. p. 335.
