= Ferdinando Sanfelice =

Italian painter (1675–1748)

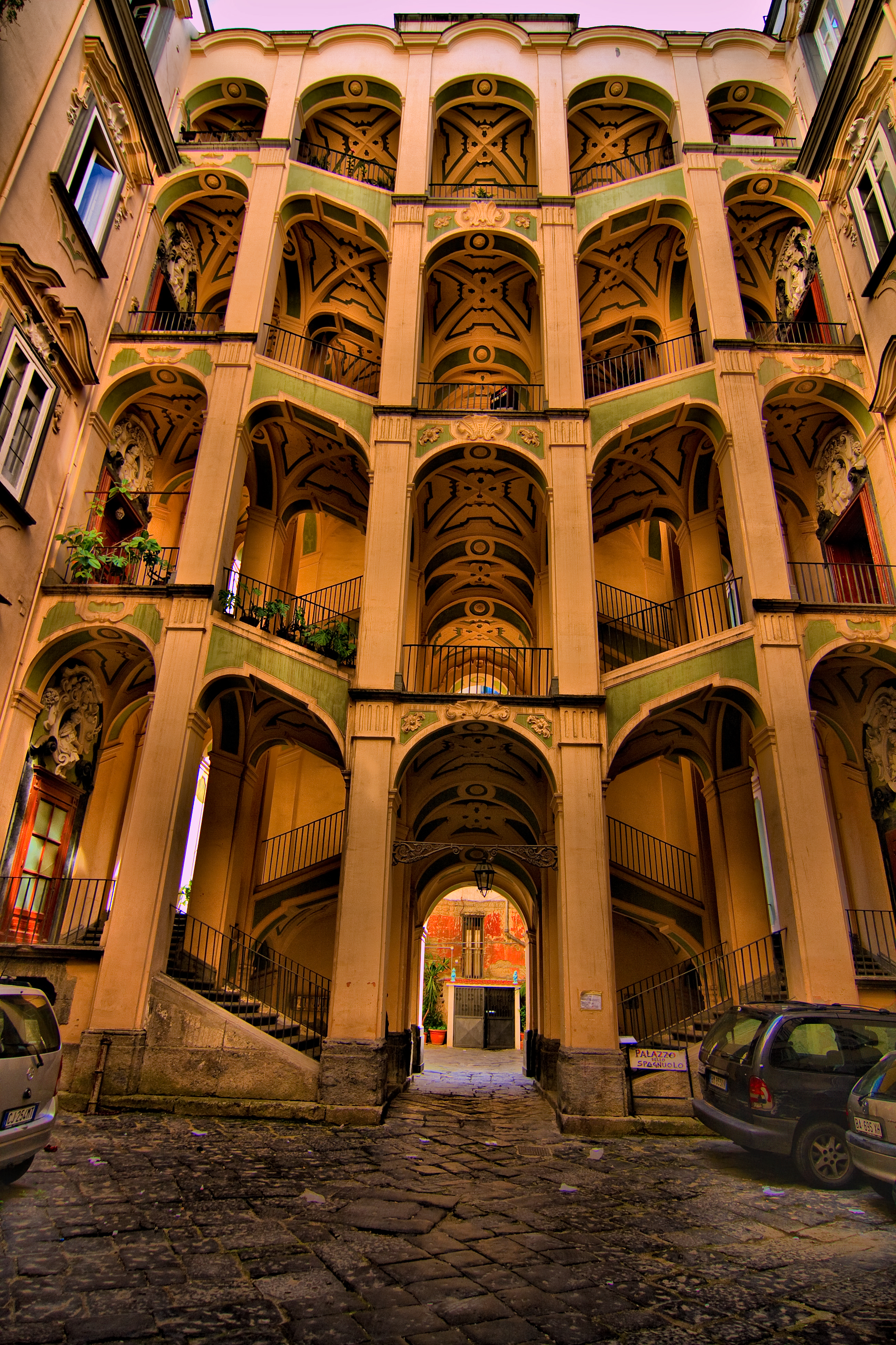
Palazzo dello Spagnolo, Naples. Sanfelice designed the stairs.

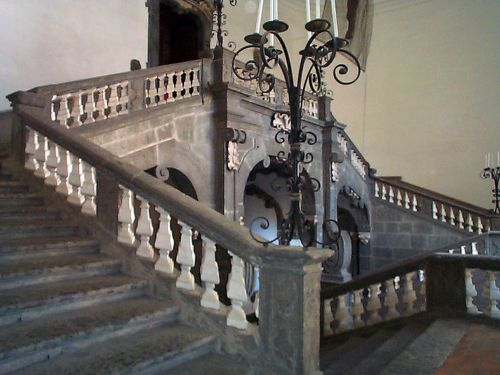
Stairway within the Palazzo Serra di Cassano in Naples.

Ferdinando Sanfelice (1675 – 1 April 1748) was an Italian late Baroque architect and painter.

Sanfelice was born in Naples, Kingdom of Naples and died there. He was one of the principal architects in Naples in the first half of the 18th century. He was a student of Francesco Solimena.

Sanfelice was known primarily for temporary displays and his secular architecture. The former involved displays such as those set up for royal visits and births as well as for religious celebrations; the latter included a large number of family dwellings in Naples, including his own Palazzo Sanfelice, built between 1723 and 1728, and the Palazzo Serra di Cassano, finished around 1730. Most notable in Sanfelice's architecture are the staircases; rather than being incidental features set off to the side of a courtyard, he gave them central and prominent positions so that they became important architectural features in their own right, often as double staircases.

Sanfelice also worked on churches in Naples, including San Lorenzo Maggiore, San Giovanni a Carbonara, and the chapel of the Nunziatella at the Nunziatella military academy.

== See also ==
- Santa Maria del Faro, a church in the quartiere of Posillipo of Naples, Italy
